= Guwahati Theatre Festival =

Theatre festival in Guwahati, Assam

Coordinates: 26.178509°N 91.7350864°E

- Status: Active
- Genre: Theatre festival
- Frequency: Annual
- Venue: Pragjyoti ITA Cultural Complex
- Locations: Guwahati, Assam
- Country: India
- Inaugurated: 2016
- Founder: Sunit Jain
- Previous event: 2017
- Next event: 2018
- Organiser: G Plus
- Website: guwahatitheatrefestival.com

Guwahati Theatre Festival is an annual theatre festival held in Guwahati city of Assam state, India. The festival is organized by G Plus, an English-language weekly tabloid newspaper in Guwahati. The festival aims to provide a platform to performing groups to showcase their productions before a new audience in the Guwahati city and North East region.

== History ==
The festival was started in 2016 by G Plus.

=== 2016 ===
The inaugural festival began on 23 September 2016, and featured Kalki Koechlin, Saurabh Shukla, Neil Bhoopalam, Rajat Kapoor, Vinay Pathak, Jim Sarbh, Sadiya Siddiqui, Shernaz Patel, Dolly Thakore and Achint Kaur. The maiden festival also featured globally acclaimed play Hamlet - The Clown Prince, directed by Rajat Kapoor and The Vagina Monologues written by Eve Ensler.

Other plays staged during the festival was The Living Room, 2 to Tango 3 to Jive, The Vagina Monologues, The Truth of Womanhood, and One on One.

=== 2017 ===
The second edition of Guwahati Theatre Festival commenced on 1 November 2017, featured Bollywood actors Rajat Kapoor, Shabana Azmi, Vinay Pathak, Ranvir Shorey, and Arundhati Nag. The festival featured plays like Quasar Padamsee's Mother Courage and Her Children, Alyque Padamsee's Broken Images, The Gentlemen’s Club a.k.a. Tape by Sheena Khalid, Vikram Phukan, Puja Sarup, Rachel D'souza. The event also presented two plays based on William Shakespeare's works, What's done is done, and Piya Behrupia (Twelfth Night) by Mumbai based two theatre production houses.

The Guwahati Theatre Festival also conducts workshops for school and college students in various areas of theatrics in collaboration with Brahmaputra Foundation and supported by North Eastern Council, Ministry for Development of North Eastern Region.

=== 2018 ===
The third season of Guwahati Theatre Festival was held from 16 November to 18 November 2018.

The festival featured plays like Laughter Therapy, played by Bollywood actors like Mona Singh, Siddharth Merchant, Danesh Khambata, Danesh Irani and Sajeel Parakh and Hindi escape drama, Detective 9-2-11, directed by Atul Kumar, featured actors like Neil Bhoopalam and Sukant Goyel.

It also featured a solo show, Foreign Body, by artist Imogen Butler-Cole from London about hope, healing and forgiveness after sexual assault and Stories in a Song, which was directed by Sunil Shanbag.

The festival organised a theatre workshop, conducted by Namit Das and Atul Kumar Khamakar, which was attended by more than 60 school students.

== Life in a Theatre Award ==
The festival also constitutes the Life in a Theatre Award that was given out to Kulada Kumar Bhattacharjee in 2016 and posthumously to Padma Shri awardee Arun Sarma in 2017.

The Life in a Theatre Award, 2018 was posthumously presented to Sukracharjya Rabha for his contribution in the field of theatre direction.

== Patrons ==
Audi, Ballantine's, State Bank of India were the main sponsors of The Guwahati Theatre Festival 2016. The second edition in 2017 was sponsored by Apollo Hospitals, Airtel, Indian Oil, Ballantine's and Hastakshar.

The third edition in 2018 was supported by Apollo Hospitals, North East Small Finance Bank, Mahindra & Mahindra and Indian Oil.

== See also ==
- Metropolis Asia
- Alcheringa (festival)
- Cinema of Assam
- List of theatre festivals
