= Hamburger Theaterfestival =

Hamburger Theaterfestival is a theatre festival in Germany.
