= Lady Macbeth =

Character in the play Macbeth

- Macbeth character
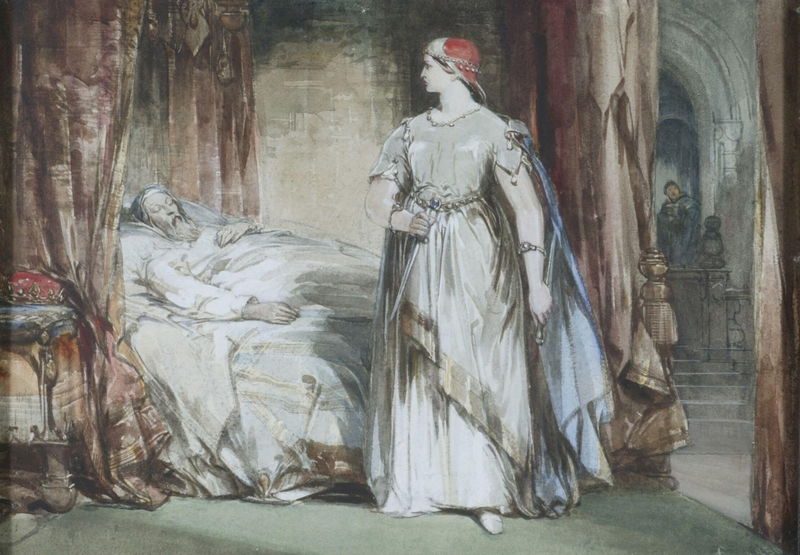
- Lady Macbeth observes King Duncan (by George Cattermole, c. 1850)
- Created by: William Shakespeare
- Based on: Gruoch
- Portrayed by: List: Sarah Siddons; Charlotte Melmoth; Charlotte Cushman; Helen Faucit; Ellen Terry; Jeanette Nolan; Vivien Leigh; Isuzu Yamada; Judith Anderson; Simone Signoret; Namsrayn Suvd; Vivien Merchant; Francesca Annis; Judi Dench; Maggie Smith; Glenda Jackson; Angela Bassett; Alex Kingston; Kate Fleetwood; Marion Cotillard; Hannah Taylor-Gordon; Frances McDormand; Saoirse Ronan; Valene Kane; Sally McKenzie; Indira Varma; Anna Marie Franco; Heidi Marie Moo

Lady Macbeth is a leading character in William Shakespeare's Macbeth, a tragedy written c. 1603–1607. As the wife of the play's tragic hero, Macbeth (a Scottish nobleman), Lady Macbeth goads him into committing regicide, after which she becomes Queen of Scotland. Some regard her as becoming more powerful than Macbeth when she does this, because she is able to manipulate him into doing what she wants. After Macbeth becomes a murderous tyrant, she is driven to madness by guilt over their crimes and kills herself offstage.

Lady Macbeth is a powerful presence in the play, particularly in the first two acts. Following the murder of King Duncan, however, her role in the plot diminishes. She becomes an uninvolved spectator to Macbeth's plotting and a nervous hostess at a banquet dominated by her husband's hallucinations. Her sleepwalking scene in the fifth act is a turning point in the play, and her line "Out, damned spot!" has become a phrase familiar to many speakers of the English language. The report of her death late in the fifth act provides the inspiration for Macbeth's "Tomorrow and tomorrow and tomorrow" speech.

The role has attracted many notable actresses over the centuries, including Sarah Siddons, Charlotte Melmoth, Helen Faucit, Ellen Terry, Jeanette Nolan, Vivien Leigh, Isuzu Yamada, Simone Signoret, Vivien Merchant, Glenda Jackson, Francesca Annis, Judith Anderson, Judi Dench, Renee O'Connor, Helen McCrory, Keeley Hawes, Alex Kingston, Reshmi Sen, Marion Cotillard, Hannah Taylor-Gordon, Frances McDormand, Tabu, Ruth Negga, Saoirse Ronan and Valene Kane.

== Analyses ==
=== Lady Macbeth as anti-mother ===
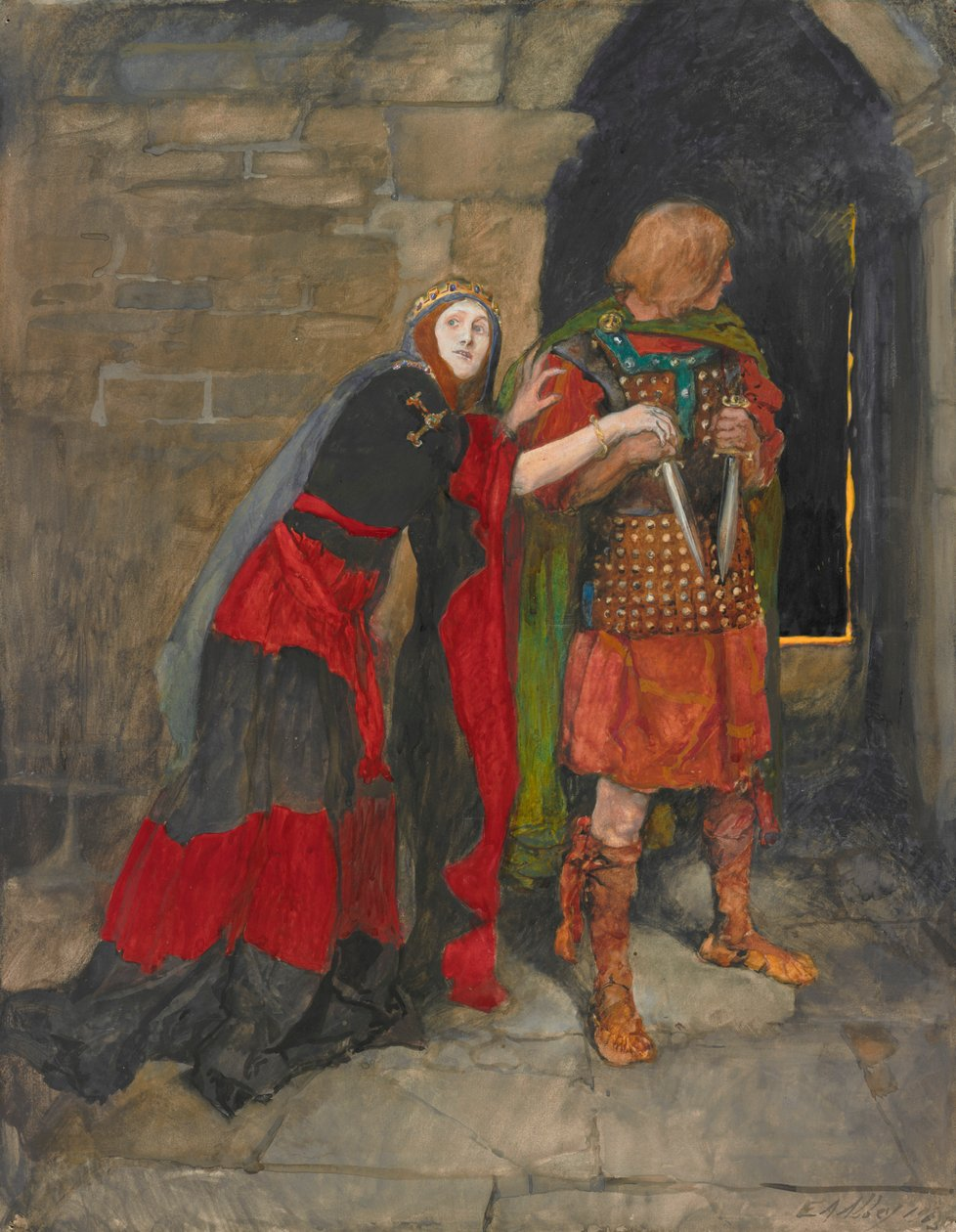
Depiction of Lady Macbeth in Act II, scene II of Macbeth by Edwin Austin Abbey

Stephanie Chamberlain in her article "Fantasizing Infanticide: Lady Macbeth and the Murdering Mother in Early Modern England" argues that though Lady Macbeth wants power, her power is "conditioned on maternity", which was a "conflicted status in early modern England". Chamberlain argues that the negative images of Lady Macbeth as a mother figure, such as when she discusses her ability to "dash the brains" of the babe that sucks her breast, reflect controversies concerning the image of motherhood in early modern England. In early modern England, mothers were often accused of hurting the people that were placed in their hands. Lady Macbeth then personifies all mothers of early modern England who were condemned for Lady Macbeth's fantasy of infanticide. Lady Macbeth's fantasy, Chamberlain argues, is not struggling to be a man, but rather struggling with the condemnation of being a bad mother that was common during that time.

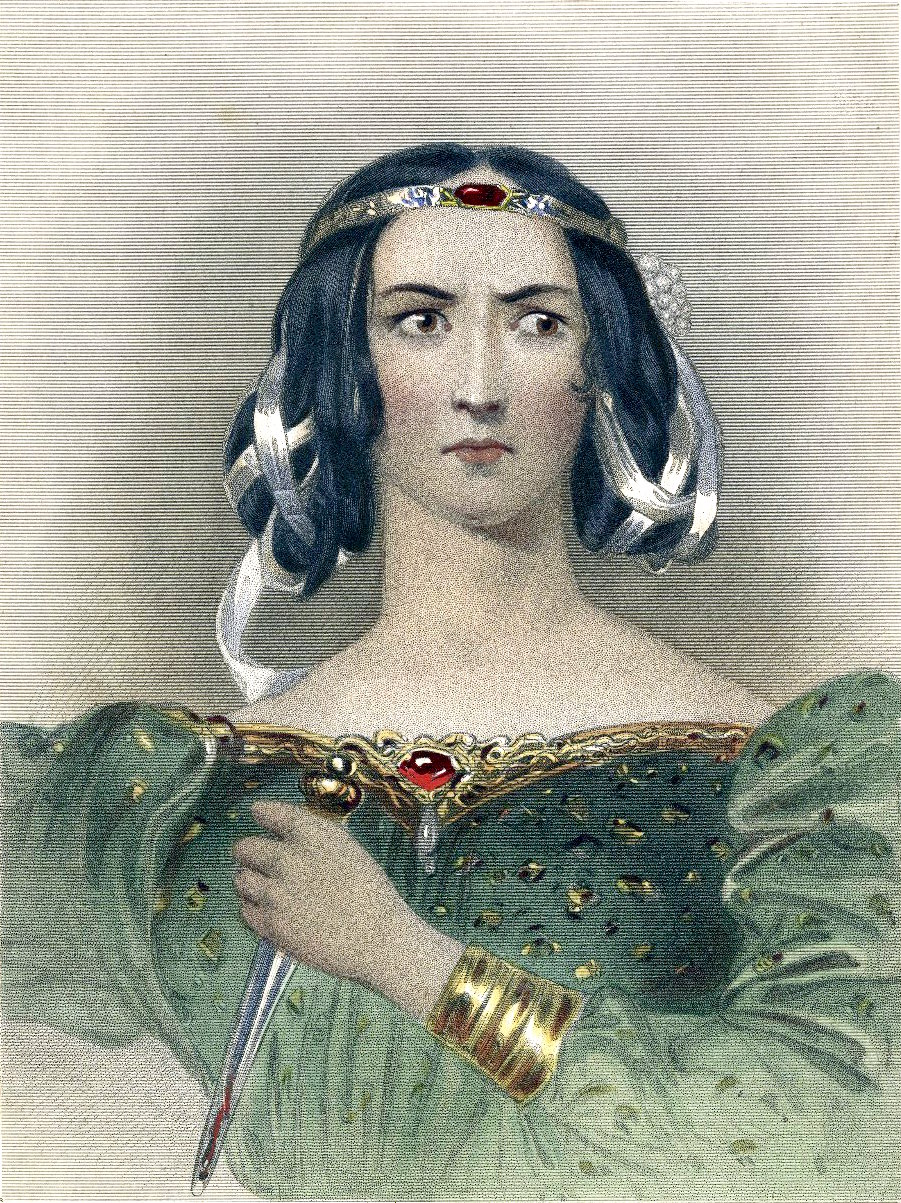
A print of Lady Macbeth from Mrs. Anna Jameson's 1832 analysis of Shakespeare's heroines, Characteristics of Women

Jenijoy La Belle takes a slightly different view in her article, "A Strange Infirmity: Lady Macbeth's Amenorrhea". La Belle states that Lady Macbeth does not wish for just a move away from femininity; she is asking the spirits to eliminate the basic biological characteristics of womanhood, to make her more powerful and less 'weak'. The main biological characteristic that La Belle focuses on is menstruation. La Belle argues that by asking to be "unsex[ed]" and crying out to spirits to "make thick [her] blood / Stop up th' access and passage to remorse", Lady Macbeth asks for her menstrual cycle to stop. By having her menstrual cycle stop, Lady Macbeth hopes to stop any feelings of sensitivity and caring that is associated with females. She hopes to become like a man to stop any sense of remorse for the regicide. La Belle furthers her argument by connecting the stopping of the menstrual cycle with the persistent infanticide motifs in the play. La Belle gives examples of "the strangled babe" whose finger is thrown into the witches' cauldron (4.1.30); Macduff's babes who are "savagely slaughter'd" (4.3.235); and the suckling babe with boneless gums whose brains Lady Macbeth would dash out (1.7.57–58) to argue that Lady Macbeth represents the ultimate anti-mother: not only would she smash in a baby's brains but she would go even further to stop her means of procreation altogether.

=== Lady Macbeth as a witch ===
Some literary critics and historians argue that not only does Lady Macbeth represent an anti-mother figure in general, she also embodies a specific type of anti-mother: the witch. Modern day critic Joanna Levin defines a witch as a woman who succumbs to Satanic force, a lust for the devil, and who, either for this reason or the desire to obtain supernatural powers, invokes (evil) spirits. Levin refers to Marianne Hester's Lewd Women and Wicked Witches: A Study of Male Domination, in which Hester articulates a feminist interpretation of the witch as an empowered woman. Levin summarises the claim of feminist historians like Hester: the witch should be a figure celebrated for her nonconformity, defiance, and general sense of empowerment; witches challenged patriarchal authority and hierarchy, specifically "threatening hegemonic sex/gender systems". This view associates witchcraft – and by extension, Lady Macbeth – not with villainy and evil, but with heroism.

The literary scholar Jenijoy La Belle assesses Lady Macbeth's femininity and sexuality as they relate to motherhood as well as witchhood. The fact that she conjures spirits likens her to a witch, and the act itself establishes a similarity in the way that both Lady Macbeth and the Weird Sisters from the play "use the metaphoric powers of language to call upon spiritual powers who in turn will influence physical events – in one case the workings of the state, in the other the workings of a woman's body." Like the witches, Lady Macbeth strives to make herself an instrument for bringing about the future.

She proves herself a defiant, empowered nonconformist, and an explicit threat to a patriarchal system of governance in that, through challenging his masculinity, she manipulates Macbeth into murdering King Duncan. Despite the fact that she calls him a coward, Macbeth remains reluctant, until she asks: "What beast was't, then, that made you break this enterprise to me? / When you durst do it, then you were a man; / And to be more than what you were, you would / Be so much more the man." Thus Lady Macbeth enforces a masculine conception of power, yet only after pleading to be unsexed, or defeminised.

== Performance history ==
In 2001 the actress Maura Tierney portrayed a modernised version of Lady Macbeth in the satirical film Scotland, PA.

In 2009 Pegasus Books published The Tragedy of Macbeth Part II, a play by the American author and playwright Noah Lukeman. It endeavoured to offer a sequel to Macbeth and to resolve its many loose ends, particularly Lady Macbeth's reference to her having had a child (which, historically, she did – from a previous marriage, having remarried Macbeth after being widowed). Written in blank verse, it was published to critical acclaim.

Alex Kingston starred as Lady Macbeth opposite Kenneth Branagh in his and Rob Ashford's adaption of Macbeth. It was first performed at the Manchester Festival in 2013 and then transferred to New York City for a limited engagement in 2014.

Marion Cotillard portrayed Lady Macbeth in Justin Kurzel's 2015 film adaptation opposite Michael Fassbender as Macbeth.

Frances McDormand portrayed the character in the 2021 film The Tragedy of Macbeth opposite Denzel Washington as Macbeth directed by her husband Joel Coen, the first film directed without his brother Ethan Coen.

In the 2022 Broadway revival of Macbeth, directed by Sam Gold, Ruth Negga played Lady Macbeth opposite Daniel Craig as Macbeth.

== In popular culture ==
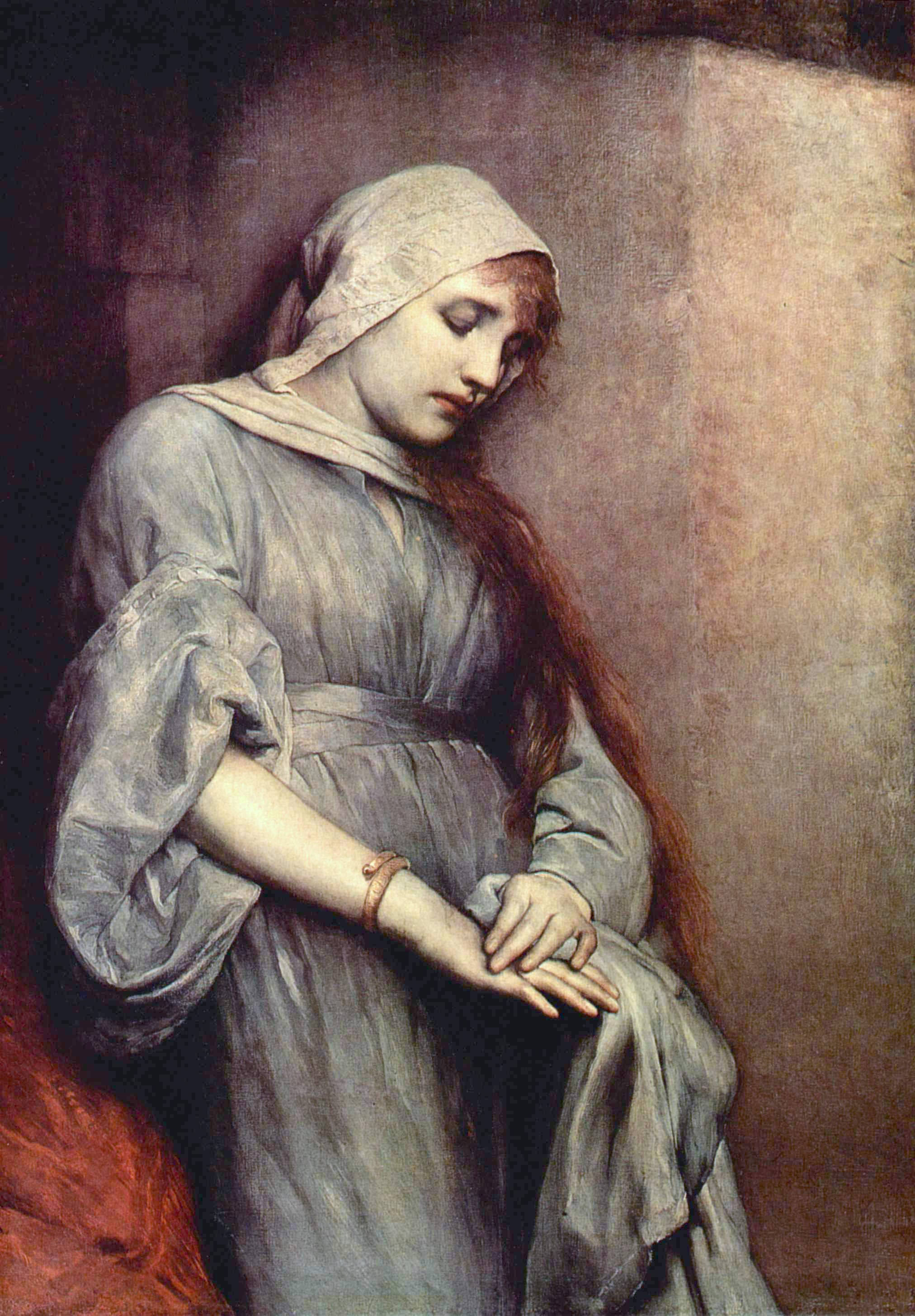
Gabriel von Max's depiction of Lady Macbeth.

- All Our Yesterdays: A Novel of Lady Macbeth, by Joel H. Morris, was published by Putnam Books, a division of Penguin Random House, in 2024. A prequel to the play, it interweaves the historical Lady Macbeth and her son with the characters depicted in Shakespeare's tragedy.
- During former United States President Bill Clinton's 1992 campaign for the American presidency, Daniel Wattenberg's August 1992 The American Spectator article "The Lady Macbeth of Little Rock", and some twenty other articles in major publications drew comparisons between his wife and Lady Macbeth, questioning Hillary Clinton's ideological and ethical record in comparison to Shakespeare's famous character and suggesting parallels.
- The Simpsons' twentieth episode of its twentieth season, "Four Great Women and a Manicure" contains a section in which Marge induces Homer to murder other members of the cast of the play.
- In 2008, Three Rivers Press published Lady Macbeth by Susan Fraser King. The novel is original fiction, based on source material regarding the period and person of Lady Macbeth.
- Julia Gillard was compared to Lady Macbeth after she ousted Kevin Rudd as Prime Minister of Australia in June 2010. The most often cited parallels between Gillard and Lady Macbeth were that Gillard was a red-haired and 'deliberately barren' woman, while the event itself occurred late in the evening, much like King Duncan's murder. Additionally, the perpetrator succeeded the victim, Julia Gillard became the Prime Minister after "killing" Kevin Rudd's career while the Macbeths were proclaimed King and Queen after King Duncan's death. Additional parallels to the play Macbeth, more broadly, include the fact that Gillard was labelled a witch, was the recipient of misogynistic attitudes, and Gillard's statement to Senator Kim Carr that the Labor Government was sleepwalking to defeat.
- Gisele Barreto Fetterman, the wife of Pennsylvania Senator John Fetterman, was compared to Lady Macbeth for her alleged manipulation of her husband by right wing pundits.
- Tabu portrayed the character in the Indian movie Maqbool by director Vishal Bharadwaj which was an adaptation of Macbeth. But the director added the twist of making the character be the wife of King Duncan (who is a mafia don called Abbaji in the movie) acted by Pankaj Kapur and who has an adulterous relationship with Macbeth (Maqbool) acted by Irrfan Khan.
- In 2024, Penguin Random House published Lady Macbeth by Ava Reid. The novel is a reimagining of the Tragedy of Macbeth under the lens of fantasy, and borrows from the character of Lady Macbeth while still remaining original fiction.
- Jill Biden, former First Lady of the United States and wife of 46th President Joe Biden, was compared to Lady Macbeth after she was adamant about her husband staying in the 2024 presidential election following his debate performance and associated age and health concerns.
- Kim Keon-hee, former First Lady of South Korea and wife of South Korea's 13th President Yoon Suk-yeol, has been compared to Lady Macbeth after being accused of being the main culprit behind the 2024 martial law crisis and her husband's subsequent downfall as the President of South Korea due to this crisis.

== See also ==
- What's done is done
