= Fleance =

Character in Shakespeare's play Macbeth

- Macbeth character
- Created by: William Shakespeare
- Portrayed by: Akira Kubo; Craig Stott; Lucas Barker

In-universe information
- Family: Banquo (father)
- Nationality: Scottish

Fleance (/ˈfleɪɒns/ FLAY-onss; also spelled Fléance or Fleans; Latin: Fleanchus) is a figure in legendary Scottish history. He was depicted by 16th-century historians as the son of Lord Banquo, Thane of Lochaber, and the ancestor of the kings of the House of Stuart. Fleance is best known as a character in William Shakespeare's play Macbeth, in which the Three Witches prophesy that Banquo's descendants shall be kings. Some screen adaptations of the story expand on Fleance's role by showing his return to the kingdom after Macbeth's death.

Shakespeare's play is adapted from Holinshed's Chronicles, a history of the British Isles written during the late 16th century. In Holinshed, Fleance escapes Macbeth and flees to England, where he fathers a son who later becomes the first hereditary steward to the King of Scotland.

In real life, 'Steward' eventually became the name 'Stewart' (later changed to a pseudo Frenchification 'Stuart'), and Walter Stewart married Princess Marjorie, daughter of Robert the Bruce. Their son, Robert II, began the Stewart/Stuart line of kings in Scotland. James VI and I, son of Mary, Queen of Scots, was the ninth Stewart/Stuart monarch (eighth king) of Scotland and the first of the Stuart monarchs of England and Ireland.

James VI & I was the reigning monarch when William Shakespeare wrote and produced Macbeth, which may have been in the new king's honour.

== History ==
Fleance and his father Banquo are both fictional characters presented as historical fact by the Scottish historian Hector Boece, whose Scotorum Historiae (1526–27) was a source for Raphael Holinshed's Chronicles, a history of the British Isles popular in Shakespeare's time. In the Chronicles, Fleance – in fear of Macbeth – flees to Wales and marries Nesta, daughter of Gruffydd ap Llywelyn, the last native Prince of Wales. They have a son named Walter who makes his way back to Scotland and is appointed Royal Steward. According to legend, he fathered the Stuart monarchs of England and Scotland.

The Stuarts used their connection with Fleance and his marriage to the Welsh princess to claim a genealogical link with the legendary King Arthur. This, they hoped, would strengthen the legitimacy of their claim to the throne. In 1722, however, Richard Hay, a Scottish historian, presented strong evidence that not only was James not a descendant of Fleance, but also that neither Fleance nor Banquo ever even existed. Most modern scholars now agree that Fleance is not a real historical figure.

Max Förster suggested the name could be derived from the Gaelic Flannchad, lit. 'red warrior', or Flann-chú, "red hound." Boece's original Latin gives the name in ablative form as Fleancho, so suggesting a nominative form *Fleanchus.

== In Macbeth ==
Fleance appears in Shakespeare's Macbeth. However, only his childhood is portrayed; the rest of his story, as it is described in Holinshed's Chronicles, does not appear in Shakespeare's play. Scholars suggest that Shakespeare does not elaborate on Fleance's life after his escape from Scotland to avoid unnecessary distraction from the story of Macbeth himself. In the First Folio, his name is spelled "Fleans" nine times, while "Fleance" only appears four times, but the latter spelling has become standard.

In Act 1, Macbeth and Banquo meet the Three Witches who foretell that Macbeth will be king and that Banquo "shalt get kings, though thou be none". Fleance also briefly appears in the first scene of Act 2, when his father tells him of "cursed thoughts that nature / Gives way to in repose!". Macbeth, aware of the threat Banquo and his son pose to his new throne, plans to have them murdered. Before Banquo goes travelling, Macbeth asks "Goes Fleance with you?" Macbeth sends three men to follow and kill them both, saying "Fleance['s] absence is no less material to me / Than is his father's." Macbeth holds a banquet that night and reveals to his wife his fears of what might happen unless Fleance and Banquo are both killed.

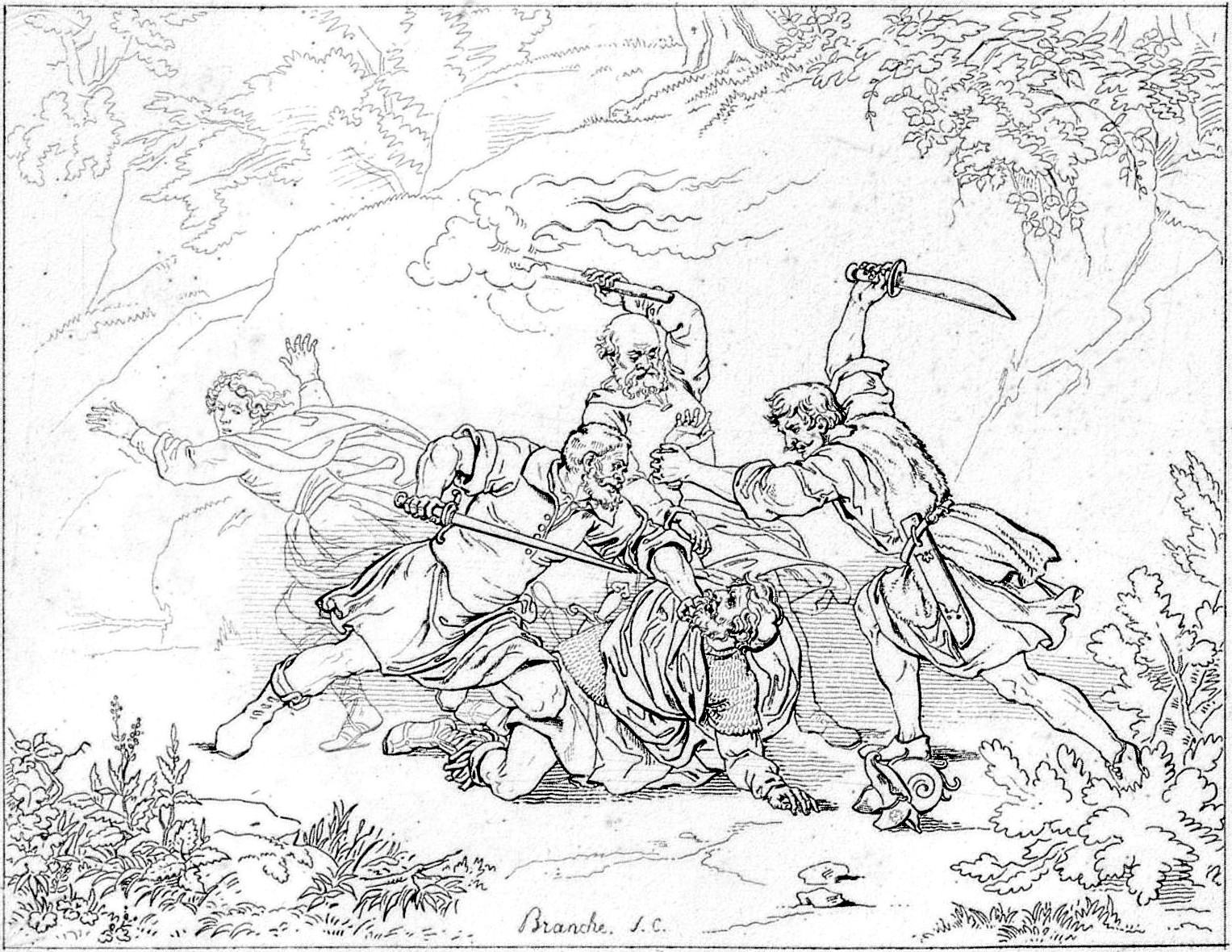
Fleance escapes the attack upon his father

Banquo and Fleance are ambushed and while Banquo holds the assailants off he cries "Fly, good Fleance, fly, fly, fly! / Thou mayst revenge." When the murderers return to Macbeth and report their failure to kill Fleance, he says, "Then comes my fit again: I had else been perfect, / Whole as the marble, founded as the rock, / As broad and general as the casing air: / But now I am cabin'd, cribb'd, confined, bound in / To saucy doubts and fears." Macbeth later meets the Three Witches again and is shown a vision of a long line of kings descended from Banquo.

=== Analysis ===
In the first scene of Act 2, Fleance meets his father, who asks him to take his sword and tells him he is reluctant to go to bed due to the "cursed thoughts that nature / gives way to in repose!" On Macbeth's approach, however, Banquo demands the sword be returned to him quickly. Scholars have interpreted this to mean that Banquo has been dreaming of murdering the king. Doing so would make the throne more available for Fleance, and would fulfill the Three Witches' prophecy that his sons would become kings. Since Banquo's good nature is revolted by these thoughts, he gives his sword and dagger to Fleance to be sure he does not act on them. Still, he is so nervous at Macbeth's approach that he demands their return. Other scholars have responded that Banquo's dreams have nothing to do with him killing the king, but that they have revealed to him Macbeth's bloody nature. They argue that Banquo is merely setting aside his sword for the night, but when Macbeth approaches, Banquo, having had these dark dreams about Macbeth, takes back his sword as a precaution. In any case, this scene adds to the dark, uncertain, unsettling tone of the play. Fleance and his father are not even certain of what time it is throughout, as Fleance says when asked at the beginning of the scene "The moon is down; I have not heard the clock."

The two scenes in which murderers attack Banquo and Fleance, Lady Macduff and Macduff's son, have been compared to Herod's attempt to murder Christ and save the throne for himself by killing all new-born children in Bethlehem. The conversation between Fleance and Banquo in their own murder scene is especially dark. Banquo's first line from within "Give us a light there, ho!" communicates the nighttime setting. The stage direction "Enter BANQUO, and FLEANCE, with a torch", seems to foreshadow the fact that Fleance is a light for Scotland in the midst of the play's black deeds.

When Macbeth returns to the witches later in the play, they show him an apparition of the murdered Banquo, along with eight kings of his family, descending through Fleance. King James, on the throne when Macbeth was written, was the ninth Stuart king. This scene thus suggests strong support for James' right to the throne by lineage, and for audiences of Shakespeare's day, was a tangible fulfilment of the witches' prophecy. The apparition is also deeply unsettling to Macbeth, who not only wants the throne for himself, but also desires to father a line of kings.

=== Theatre and screen versions ===
Theatre and screen versions of Macbeth have sometimes elaborated on Fleance's role.

In Orson Welles's film version of Macbeth (1948), Fleance is briefly seen again at the very end of the movie. He does not speak in this scene, but he has returned to Scotland with the army of Malcolm and Macduff, and is shown along with those hailing Malcolm as the new king after the killing of Macbeth.

The BBC Shakespeare version of Macbeth shows Fleance in the final scene, implying his future role in bringing Banquo's line to the throne.

In Joe MacBeth (1955), the first film to transpose Macbeth into a gang and Mafia-like setting, Fleance is replaced by a character named Lenny. Lenny's father, Banky, is killed, but Lenny escapes, and gathers a group of angry mobsters to overthrow Macbeth, who has, through a series of murders, made himself the kingpin gangster in the area. Lenny is successful in killing Macbeth in the end, but only after Macbeth has murdered most of his family. In another gangster adaptation, Men of Respect (1991), Fleance is replaced by a character named Phil, who similarly helps overthrow Mike (Macbeth) after his father, Bankie (Banquo), is murdered. Phil is inducted into the gang at the end of the film, when Mal (Malcolm) has taken over, suggesting that the violent gang culture will continue through generations. This sentiment echoes into the final scenes of Penny Woolcock's Macbeth on the Estate. Macduff shoots Macbeth and takes a ring (representing his high status) off Macbeth's finger. Entering a bar, he flips it to Malcolm, saying, "Hail, king." Malcolm puts it on with some show and elbows his way to the front of the bar. One of the characters he elbows is Fleance (a skinhead), who makes a mock gun out of his fingers and "shoots" at the back of the darker-skinned Malcolm's skull. Again this makes it clear that the violence will not end with the new generation.

In Throne of Blood, a Japanese adaptation of the play, Fleance is replaced by Yoshiteru, a character played by Akira Kubo. The Macbeth and Banquo characters, Washizu and Miki, are told by an old woman spinning wool in a hut that while Washizu will rule the Forest Castle one day, Miki's son Yoshiteru will eventually inherit it for himself. Washizu takes the throne and at one point is about to make Yoshiteru his heir, but changes his mind when his wife tells him she is pregnant. Washizu instead arranges to have Yoshiteru and his father killed, but Yoshiteru escapes. Another adaptation filmed in India, Maqbool (2003), replaces Fleance with a character named Guddu. Maqbool (Macbeth) attempts to have Guddu murdered to strengthen power within the organised crime circle. Guddu, however, survives and marries the daughter of the former crime lord.

In Macbett, Eugène Ionesco's 1972 stage adaptation, Fleance is merged with the Malcolm character. Macol (Malcolm), who is thought to be King Duncan's son, is revealed to be Banco's (Banquo's). Duncan, wanting a male heir, adopted Macol. Macol fills the role of Malcolm in taking the kingdom from Macbett (Macbeth) at the end of the play.

In the 2006 modern dress film adaptation, set among gangsters in Melbourne, Fleance (Craig Stott) is depicted as a teenage boy, looking slightly older than in the original play. He also appears a bit more often, mainly in the scenes of Act V, where he sneaks on board a truck full of timber and witnesses the death of Macbeth before killing the maid and being directed home by Macduff.

In Joel Coen's 2021 film, Fleance (Lucas Barker) is retrieved from the Old Man (Kathryn Hunter) by (the more prominent than usual) character of Ross (Alex Hassell), who has played an ambiguous role throughout the film.

=== Influence ===
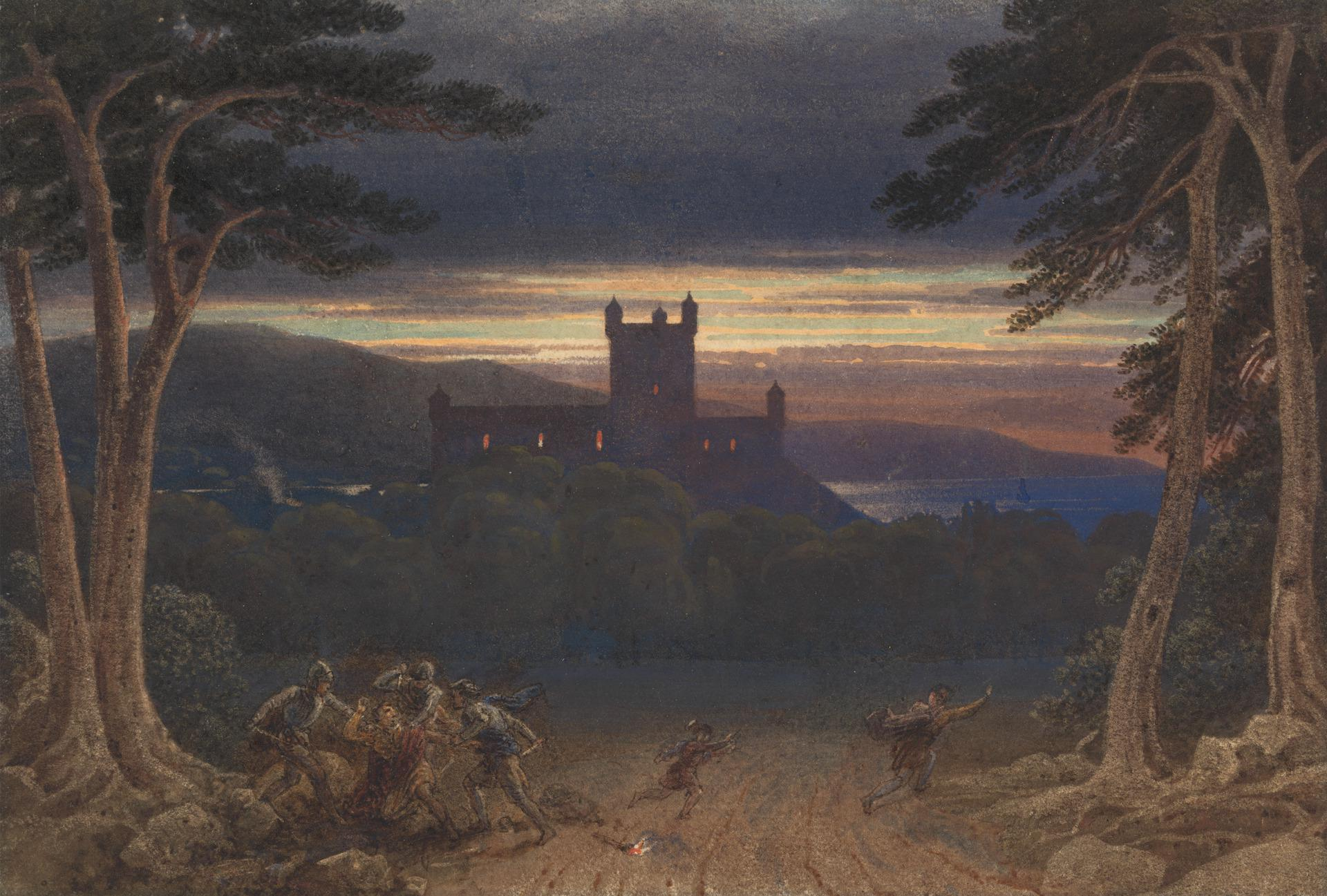
The Murder of Banquo (George Fennell Robson, c. 1830); Fleance flees at lower centre.

Fleance's line "The moon is down, I have not heard the clock" was the inspiration for the title of John Steinbeck's 1942 short novel The Moon is Down. Fleance's line foreshadows the evil encompassing the kingdom. The book was published just as the United States entered World War II and signalled the threat of the Axis powers by outlining the events in a European town occupied by foreign powers. Steinbeck's book became a Broadway play and a film.

In 2008, Pegasus Books published The Tragedy of Macbeth Part II: The Seed of Banquo, a play by American author and playwright Noah Lukeman that endeavoured to pick up where the original Macbeth left off, and to resolve its many loose ends, particularly the prophesied ascension of the seed of Banquo. Written in blank verse, the play was published to critical acclaim.

Another book published in 2009 by Penguin Books, Banquo's Son, is the first in a trilogy that follows on from the Shakespearean story. The novels are written by New Zealand author and English teacher, T.K. Roxborogh.

== Bibliography ==
- Alexander, Catherine. The Cambridge Shakespeare Library. Cambridge: Cambridge University Press, 2003. ISBN 0-521-80800-6
- Bevington, David. Four Tragedies. Bantam, 1988. ISBN 0-553-21283-4
- Burt, Richard. Shakespeares after Shakespeare. Westport: Greenwood Press, 2007. ISBN 0-313-33116-2
- Erskine, Thomas; et al. (2000). Video versions : film adaptations of plays on video. Westport, Conn.: Greenwood Press. ISBN 0-313-30185-9.
- Ferguson, William. The Identity of the Scottish Nation. Edinburgh: Edinburgh University Press, 1998. ISBN 0-7486-1071-5
- Holland, Peter. Shakespeare Survey: an Annual Survey of Shakespeare Studies and Production. Cambridge: Cambridge University Press, 2004. ISBN 0-521-84120-8
- Jorgensen, Paul A. Our Naked Frailties: Sensational Art and Meaning in Macbeth. Berkeley, CA: Univ. of California Press, 1971. ISBN 978-0-520-01915-7
- Kinney, Arthur. Lies like Truth. Detroit: Wayne State University Press, 2001. ISBN 0-8143-2965-9
- Paul, Henry N. The Royal Play of Macbeth. New York: MacMillan Co., 1950
- Shakespeare, William and Sylvan Barnet. The Tragedy of Macbeth. New York: New American Library, 1998. ISBN 0-451-52677-5
- Shakespeare, William and Nicholas Brooke. The Tragedy of Macbeth. Oxford Oxfordshire: Oxford University Press, 1998. ISBN 0-19-283417-7
- Steinbeck, John. The Moon Is Down. New York: Penguin Books, 1995. ISBN 0-14-018746-4
- Rothwell, Kenneth. A History of Shakespeare on Screen. Cambridge: Cambridge University Press, 2004. ISBN 0-521-54311-8
