= Hanauer Internationale Amateurtheatertage =

Theatre festival

- Genre: Theatre festival
- Inaugurated: 1983
- Organiser: Hist(o)erisches Theater Hanau
- Website: www.ht-hanau.de/de/

Hanauer Internationale Amateurtheatertage is a theatre festival in Hanau, Germany. It is organized by the Histoerisches Theater Association, and theatrical performances from casts across Europe are annually hosted.

The festival was inaugurated in 1983.
