= John Baker (priest) =

John Baker, D.D. (died 1745), was an English academic, vice-master of Trinity College, Cambridge.

Baker was admitted to Westminster School, on the foundation, in 1691, and thence elected to Trinity College in 1695 (B.A. 1698, M.A. 1702, B.D. 1709, D.D. comitiis regiis 1717). He was elected a minor fellow of Trinity on 2 October 1701, and a major fellow on 17 April 1702. In 1722, he was appointed vice-master of the college, and in 1731, rector of Dickleburgh in Norfolk. He also held the perpetual curacy of Great St. Mary's, Cambridge. Baker was a supporter of Dr. Richard Bentley (from 1700, the new Master of Trinity College) as he sought to reform the college against significant resistance from other fellow. Baker rendered the master of Trinity great service by obtaining signatures in favour of the compromise between Bentley and Serjeant Miller in 1719. His subservience to Bentley is ridiculed in The Trinity College Triumph:

But Baker alone to the lodge was admitted.
Where he bow'd and he cring'd, and he smil'd and he prated.

Baker died on 30 October 1745, in Neville's Court in Trinity College, where, owing to financial misfortunes, he had ceased to be vice-master, and was buried at All Saints Church, Cambridge, according to directions given by him a few days before his death. His living of Dickleburgh had been sequestrated for the payment of his debts. "He had been a great beau", says William Cole, the Cambridge antiquary, "but latterly was as much the reverse of it, wearing four or five nightcaps under his wig and square cap, and a black cloak over his cloath gown and cassock, under which were various waistcoats, in the hottest weather".
