= Robert Buxton (c. 1533 – 1607) =

English politician

Robert Buxton (c. 1533 – 15 November 1607), of Tibenham and Dickleburgh, Norfolk, was an English politician.

He was a Member of Parliament (MP) for Bramber in 1559, Horsham in 1563, and Arundel in 1584.
