= Dickleburgh =

Village in Norfolk, England

Coordinates: 52.396501°N 1.185107°E

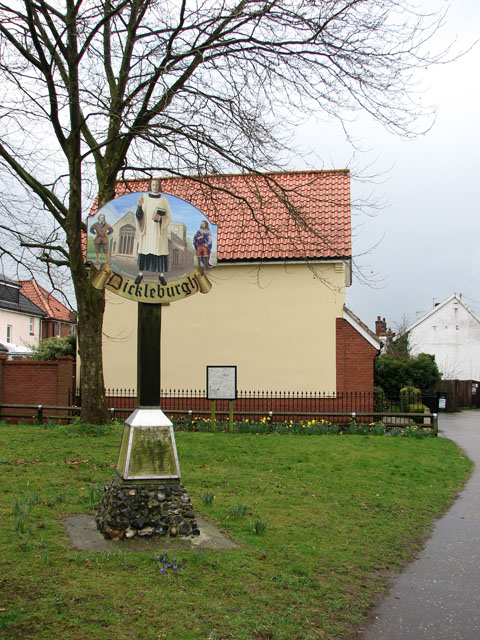
- Dickleburgh Village Sign

- Location within Norfolk
- Area: 0.42 km^{2} (0.16 sq mi)
- Population: 1,166 (2021 census)
  - Density: 2,776/km^{2} (7,190/sq mi)
  - London: 82 miles
- Civil parish: Dickleburgh and Rushall
- District: South Norfolk
- Shire county: Norfolk
- Region: East
- Country: England
- Sovereign state: United Kingdom
- Post town: DISS
- Postcode district: IP21
- Dialling code: 01379
- Police: Norfolk
- Fire: Norfolk
- Ambulance: East of England
- UK Parliament: Waveney Valley

Dickleburgh is a village and former civil parish, now in the parish of Dickleburgh and Rushall, in the South Norfolk district of the English county of Norfolk.

The village is located 3.5 miles (5.6 km) east of Diss and 17 miles (27 km) south-west of Norwich.

== History ==
Dickleburgh is situated upon what was once Pye Road, the Roman road that ran from Venta Icenorum, near Caistor St Edmund, to Camulodunum, now Colchester.

Dickleburgh's name is of Anglo-Saxon origin and derives from the Old English for 'Dicle's' or 'Dicla's' fortification.

In the Domesday Book of 1086, Dickleburgh is listed as a settlement of 22 households in the hundred of Diss. In 1086, the village was part of the estates of St. Edmunds Abbey.

In 1780 Dickleburgh Mill opened, which was turned into one of Britain's first steam-powered mills in 1834. The mill continued to expand throughout the nineteenth and twentieth centuries, generating its own electricity and providing subsidised housing for employees in the village. The mill closed in 1988 with the land being bought by Wimpey Homes for residential redevelopment.

== Geography ==
On 1 April 1936 the parish of Rushall was merged with Dickleburgh on 21 January 1980 the parish was renamed "Dickleburgh & Rushall". In 1931 the parish of Dickleburgh (prior to the merge) had a population of 679.

According to the 2021 census, the ward of Dickleburgh has a total population of 1,166 people which demonstrates an increase from the 1,096 people listed in the 2011 census.

== All Saints' Church ==
Dickleburgh's church is dedicated to All Saints and dates from the Fourteenth and Fifteenth Centuries. All Saints' is located on Norwich Road and has been Grade I listed since 1959.

All Saints' still boasts part of a Medieval rood screen as well as a set of royal arms from the reign of King Charles II, which may actually date from even earlier. All Saints' also holds stained-glass installed by Hardman & Co.

== Amenities ==
Dickleburgh has a public house, The Crown, a village shop with post office, plus a fish and chip shop.

Village groups include the Friends of Dickleburgh School, The Village Society and The Luncheon Club.

Dickleburgh Bowls Club compete in three local leagues with Dickleburgh Football Club no longer in operation.

The majority of local children attend Dickleburgh Church of England Primary School, which holds an 'Outstanding' rating from Ofsted. The majority of children attend Diss High School for secondary education.

Dickleburgh Football club (founded in 2013) play in Norfolk Sunday League and (as of 2026) got promoted to Division one of Norfolk Sunday League. James Bloomfield ,their manager, Worked at the Dickleburgh fish and chip shop before becoming a half-time manager at the club in July 2023.

== Notable residents ==
- Robert Buxton MP- (c.1533-1607) politician, possibly born in Dickleburgh.
- Dr. John Baker- (d.1745) academic & cleric, Rector of Dickleburgh from 1731.
- Henry Walton- (1746-1813) painter & art dealer, born in Dickleburgh.
- George Cattermole- (1800-1868) painter & illustrator, born in Dickleburgh.
- Bob Flowerdew- gardener & broadcaster, lives in Dickleburgh.

== Governance ==
Dickleburgh is part of the electoral ward of Beck Vale, Dickleburgh & Scole for local elections and is part of the district of South Norfolk.

The village's national constituency is Waveney Valley which has been represented by the Green Party's Adrian Ramsay MP since 2024.

== War Memorial ==
Dickleburgh War Memorial is located in All Saints' Churchyard and is an elaborate, marble latin cross which was sculpted by Arthur George Walker in 1920. The memorial was updated in 1949 and later restored in 2014. The memorial lists the following names for the First World War:

Rank	Name	Unit	Date of Death	Burial/Commemoration
Sgt.	Alfred Bloomfield	Royal Garrison Artillery	7 Jul. 1916	Lembet Road Cemetery
Sgt.	Harry W. Hales	2nd Bn., Royal Munster Fusiliers	21 Dec. 1914	Le Touret Memorial
Sgt.	Ernest W. Mills	1/4th Bn., Norfolk Regiment	18 Jun. 1917	Port Said Memorial
Sgt.	Frank F. S. Becker	3rd Regt., South African Rifles	20 Oct. 1915	Windhoek Cemetery
Cpl.	Samuel T. Chilvers	8th Bn., East Surrey Regiment	25 Sep. 1916	Puchevillers Cemetery
LCpl.	Albert Ray	8th Bn., East Surrey Regt.	13 Jul. 1917	Perth Cemetery
Pte.	Sydney H. Catchpole	7th Bn., Bedfordshire Regiment	24 Apr. 1918	Adelaide Cemetery
Pte.	Jack Hubbard	7th Bn., Border Regiment	13 Oct. 1917	Tyne Cot
Pte.	Charles Nunn	31st (Alberta) Bn., CEF	8 Jul. 1916	Reningelst Cemetery
Pte.	William Bullingham	8th Bn., East Surrey Regt.	1 Jul. 1916	Thiepval Memorial
Pte.	Albert A. Hubbard	8th Bn., East Surrey Regt	10 Nov. 1916	Contay British Cemetery
Pte.	Frederick J. Noble	8th Bn., East Surrey Regt.	1 Jul. 1916	Dantzig Alley Cemetery
Pte.	Ernest E. Aldous	12th Bn., Middlesex Regiment	5 Dec. 1916	Étretat Cemetery
Pte.	William Nicholls	7th Bn., Norfolk Regt.	27 Aug. 1917	Monchy Cemetery
Pte.	Horace L. Stone	7th Bn., Norfolk Regt.	30 Nov. 1917	Cambrai Memorial
Pte.	Charles Staff	8th Bn., Norfolk Regt.	26 Apr. 1918	St. Sever Cemetery
Pte.	James F. Catchpole	9th Bn., Norfolk Regt.	15 Sep. 1916	Thiepval Memorial
Pte.	Basil C. Lines (Note: Pte. Lines lied about his age to enlist and died at home of pneumonia.)	Norfolk Regt.	25 Feb. 1915	All Saints' Churchyard
Pte.	Douglas W. J. Mickleburgh	4th Bn., Seaforth Highlanders	5 Dec. 1917	Lebucquière Cemetery
Tpr.	George E. Womack	1st Regt., Australian Light Horse	7 Aug. 1915	Lone Pine Memorial

And, the following for the Second World War:

Rank	Name	Unit	Date of Death	Burial
LCpl.	Hayden B. Cattermole	9th Bn., Royal Norfolk Regiment	29 Nov. 1942	All Saints' Churchyard
Pte.	Dick B. Bullock	8th Bn., Argyll and Sutherland Highlds.	5 Feb. 1945	Santerno Cemetery
Pte.	Walter G. Howlett	2nd Bn., Royal Norfolk Regt.	23 Jun. 1940	Dunkirk Memorial
Pte.	Ellis E. Reeve	Royal Norfolk Regt.	10 Mar. 1944	Diss Cemetery
Pte.	Jack G. Cattermole	7th Bn., North Staffordshire Regiment	26 May 1943	All Saints' Churchyard
Pte.	William E. Mills	5th Bn., Queen's Own Royal Regiment	16 Dec. 1943	Sangro River Cemetery
Tpr.	Cyril W. George	2nd Coy., Northamptonshire Yeomanry	7 Nov. 1945	All Saints' Churchyard
