= Dickleburgh and Rushall =

Civil parish in Norfolk, England

Coordinates: 52.363231°N 1.180344°E

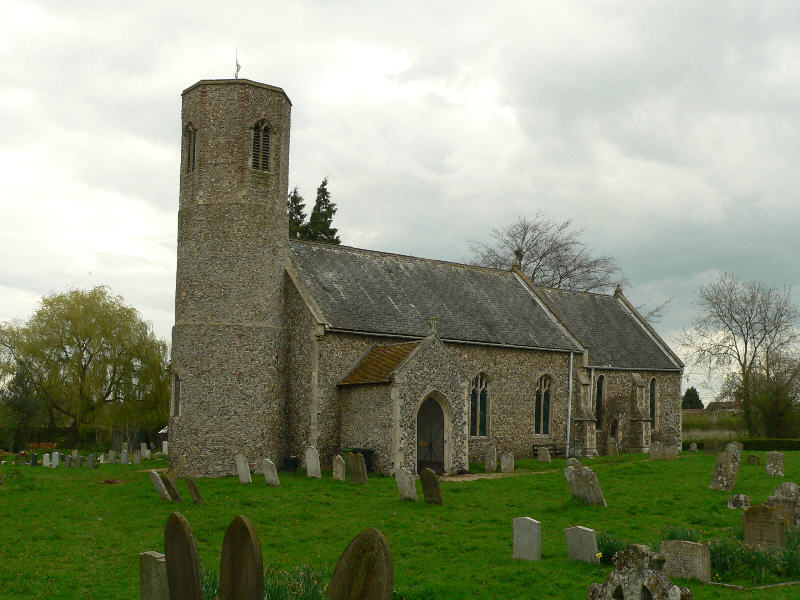
- St Mary's church

- Location within Norfolk
- Area: 14.90 km^{2} (5.75 sq mi)
- Population: 1,472 (2011)
  - Density: 99/km^{2} (260/sq mi)
- OS grid reference: TM166785
- Civil parish: Dickleburgh and Rushall
- District: South Norfolk
- Shire county: Norfolk
- Region: East
- Country: England
- Sovereign state: United Kingdom
- Post town: DISS
- Postcode district: IP21
- Police: Norfolk
- Fire: Norfolk
- Ambulance: East of England

Dickleburgh and Rushall is a civil parish in South Norfolk. It covers an area of 14.90 km^{2} (5.75 sq mi) and had a population of 1356 in 565 households at the 2001 census, increasing to 1,472 at the 2011 Census.

== Toponymy ==
The name 'Dickleburgh' means 'Dicel's/Dicla's fortification'. The specific might also be a place-name: Dic-leah, 'wood/clearing of Diss' or 'ditch wood/clearing'.

The name 'Rushall' means perhaps, 'Rif's nook of land' or the first element may be Old English 'hrif', 'belly/womb', used in some topographical sense.

== Creation ==
The parish comprises the two old parishes (pre-1973) Dickleburgh and Rushall.

== Electoral ward ==
This parish also forms part of the electoral ward of Dickleburgh. This ward stretches north to Great Moulton with a total population taken at the 2011 Census of 2,814.

== Notes ==
http://kepn.nottingham.ac.uk/map/place/Norfolk/Rushall http://kepn.nottingham.ac.uk/map/place/Norfolk/Dickleburgh
