= George Cattermole =

British artist (1800–1868)

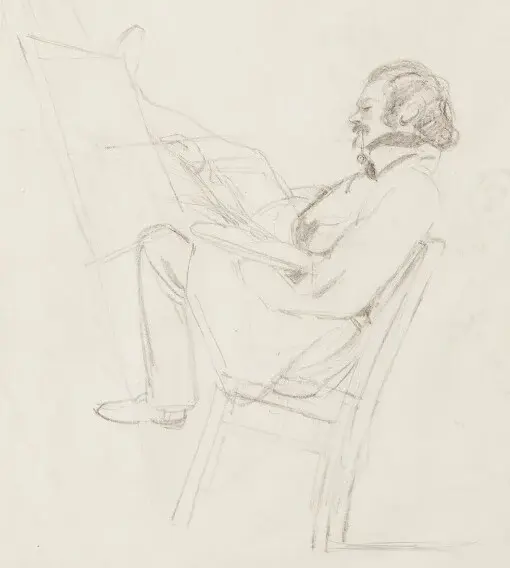
Cattermole painting, unknown artist, probably 1830s, National Portrait Gallery

George Cattermole RWS (10 August 1800 – 24 July 1868) was a British painter and illustrator, his paintings chiefly in watercolours. Unusually for watercolourists of the period, most of his paintings are figure scenes, often interiors with a crowd of figures, illustrating scenes from history or literature, or just genre scenes in historical costume, and he "became the foremost British historical painter in watercolours". He was a friend of Charles Dickens and many other literary and artistic figures. He declined both a knighthood and the presidency of the "Old" Watercolour Society (now the Royal Watercolour Society).

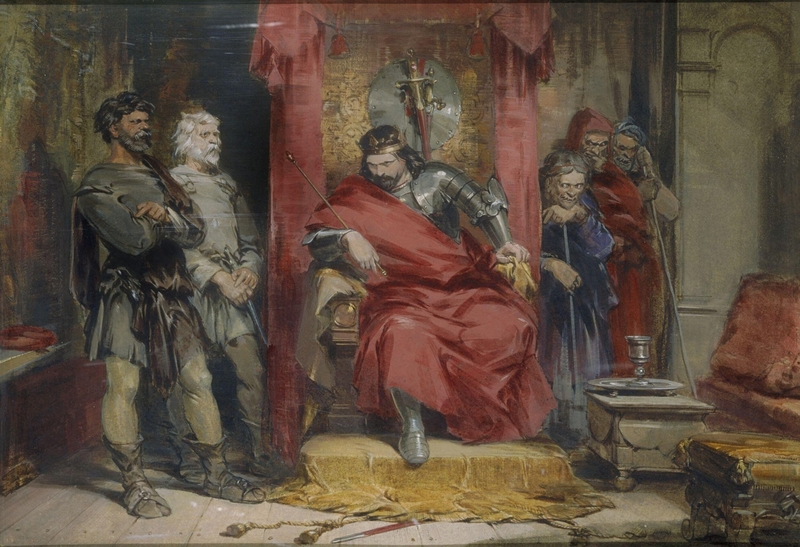
Macbeth instructing the murderers employed to kill Banquo; Victoria and Albert Museum

After early success in his career, there was something of a crisis in the 1850s, when he largely gave up watercolours for a while, and failed to make an impact painting in oils. His health caused him problems, and he was greatly affected by the early deaths of two of his children in 1862 and 1863. He was fiercely criticized in Volume I of Modern Painters (1843) by John Ruskin; Ruskin's father at one point in the early 1840s owned four Cattermoles, and one remained on the drawing room wall in 1845.

George Bernard Shaw wrote of a Cattermole exhibition in 1889: "The whole man is there—cloaks, daggers, armour, trapdoors, State barges, falcons, gauntlets, moats, keeps, serenades, anachronisms, and all. To Cattermole there was only one historic period—the past, with one appropriate costume. Fortunately it was a romantic, stately, chivalrous past, and the costume was handsome and becoming. He had imagination; and though, like Don Quixote's, it ran mostly on things that never existed, he could draw and paint them with the pleasantest ease, grace, and skill."

Samuel Redgrave described his "brigands, armourers and pirates" as "rather types of their class than possessed of any distinct individuality, and thus, as he advanced in life, he worked himself out, resulting in tameness and want of variety". But when he chose to paint real historical figures, such as Charles I, the results were "feeble in comparison with his other paintings". Redgrave says that both landscapes and architectural details were studied with the eye and then painted from memory.

== Family ==
His family contained many artists. His elder brother Richard Cattermole (1795 - 1858) began as an artist, mostly drawing churches for architectural books and prints, before becoming a clergyman in his mid-thirties. He wrote books, including histories that George illustrated. Richard's son Charles Cattermole RI (1832-1900) painted similar subjects to his uncle George, especially of the English Civil War, and in a fairly similar style. Three of George's sons were also artists. The eldest, Ernest George (1841-1863) died young after joining the Indian Army. Leonardo Foster George Cattermole (1843-1895) assisted his father, and was especially good at horses. The youngest, Sidney William George Cattermole (1858-1915) mostly painted animals, especially dogs.

== Life ==
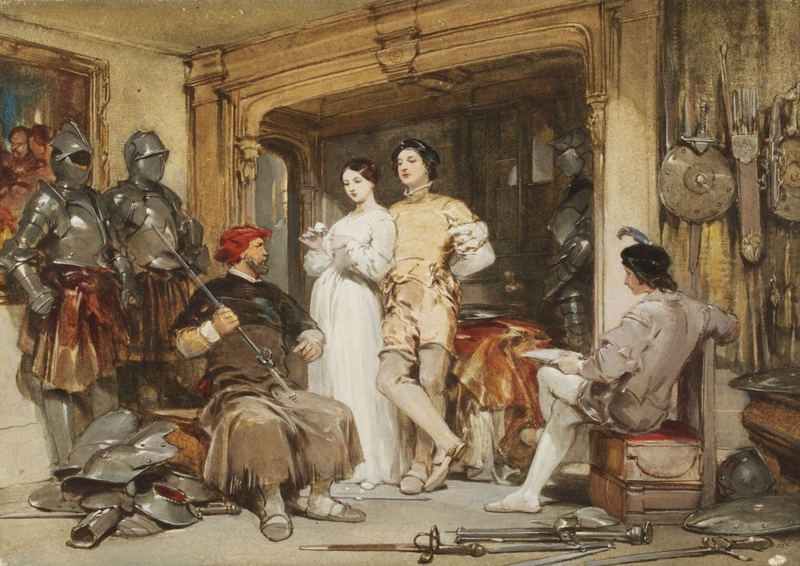
The Armourer's Tale; Victoria and Albert Museum

He was born at Dickleburgh, near Diss, Norfolk. At the age of fourteen he began working as an architectural and topographical draughtsman for the antiquary John Britton. Afterwards he contributed designs to be engraved in the literary annuals then very popular, then progressed into watercolour painting, becoming an associate of the Royal Watercolour Society in 1822, and a full member in 1833. In 1850 he withdrew from active connection with this society, and took to painting in oil; he later returned to watercolours, but not to exhibiting with the society. His most fertile period was between 1833 and 1850. At the Paris Exhibition of 1855 he received one of the five first-class gold medals awarded to British painters. He also enjoyed professional honours in Amsterdam and in Belgium.

He was successful, living in The Albany before he married, in the same rooms previously occupied by Lord Byron and then the novelist and politician Edward Bulwer-Lytton, and belonging to the Athenaeum Club and Garrick Club. He was one of the 382 founding subscribers of The London Library, which opened in 1841. Unusually for the period, he took no paying pupils, and in 1839 declined a knighthood, after making paintings of Queen Victoria and her court, and completing at the queen's request a picture of the (2nd) Diet of Speyer (V&A), which he disliked doing as there was a great crowd of figures, and he had to follow old portraits of the main ones. A watercolour of 1835, Clarence Sleeping (from Shakespeare's Richard III) is in the Royal Collection, "probably bought by Queen Victoria". His The Grave of Little Nell, illustrating a passage from Charles Dickens' novel The Old Curiosity Shop (1841) belonged to Dickens, and after his death in 1870 it was bought by his friend and biographer, John Forster, who in turn bequeathed it to the Victoria and Albert Museum. The 100 watercolours donated to the V&A by the widow of Richard Ellison to found the national collection included ten Cattermoles, one of which was The Diet of Spires (Speyer).

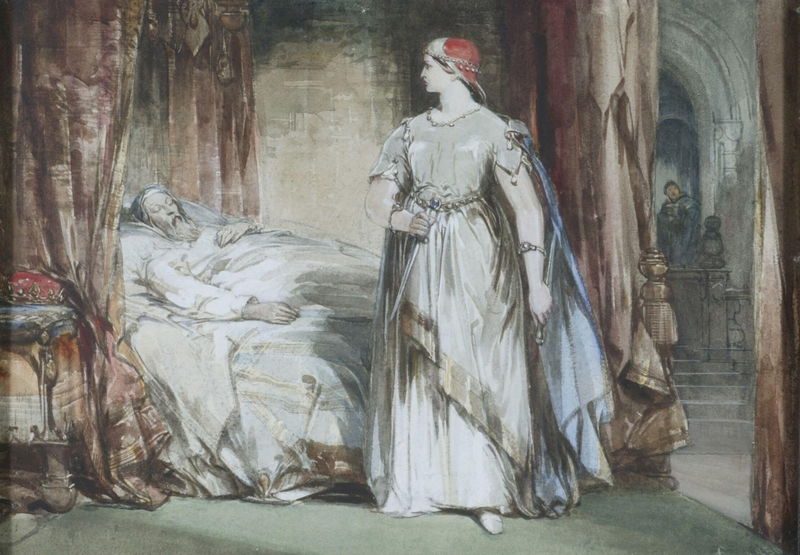
Lady Macbeth, V&A

Though high-spirited and very sociable in his earlier career, he was "a bit of a dandy", and unusually fussy about the use of language. His politics were Tory, and though he was religious, his many subjects showing medieval monastic life did not reflect his personal interests, or detailed understanding of it in matters such as costume. He was raised as a Baptist, and only formally entered the Church of England at the start of 1851, during a crisis in his health. Cattermole is buried in West Norwood Cemetery, near the tomb of his first employer John Britton.

== Works and working practices ==
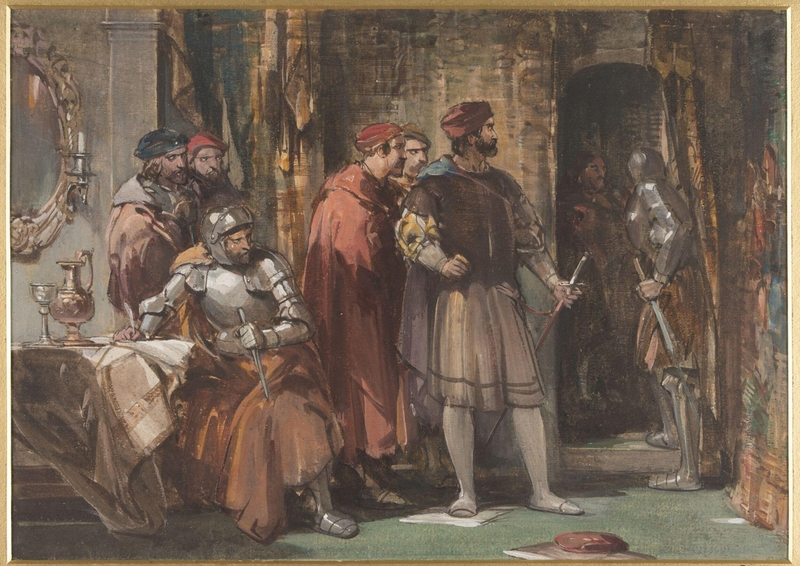
The Darnley Conspirators, V&A

In the earlier part of his career he worked in pure watercolour, but then, from at least about 1840, introduced increasing amounts of opaque bodycolours. He favoured a particular type of paper, originally produced for packaging, which he later had made for him by Winsor and Newton, and was known by his name. This was "a thick absorbent paper, rather warm and brownish in colour", perhaps partly accounting for "an appearance of fading" in many works. He disliked the fashion of the day for framing watercolours with gold mounts, preferring plain white.

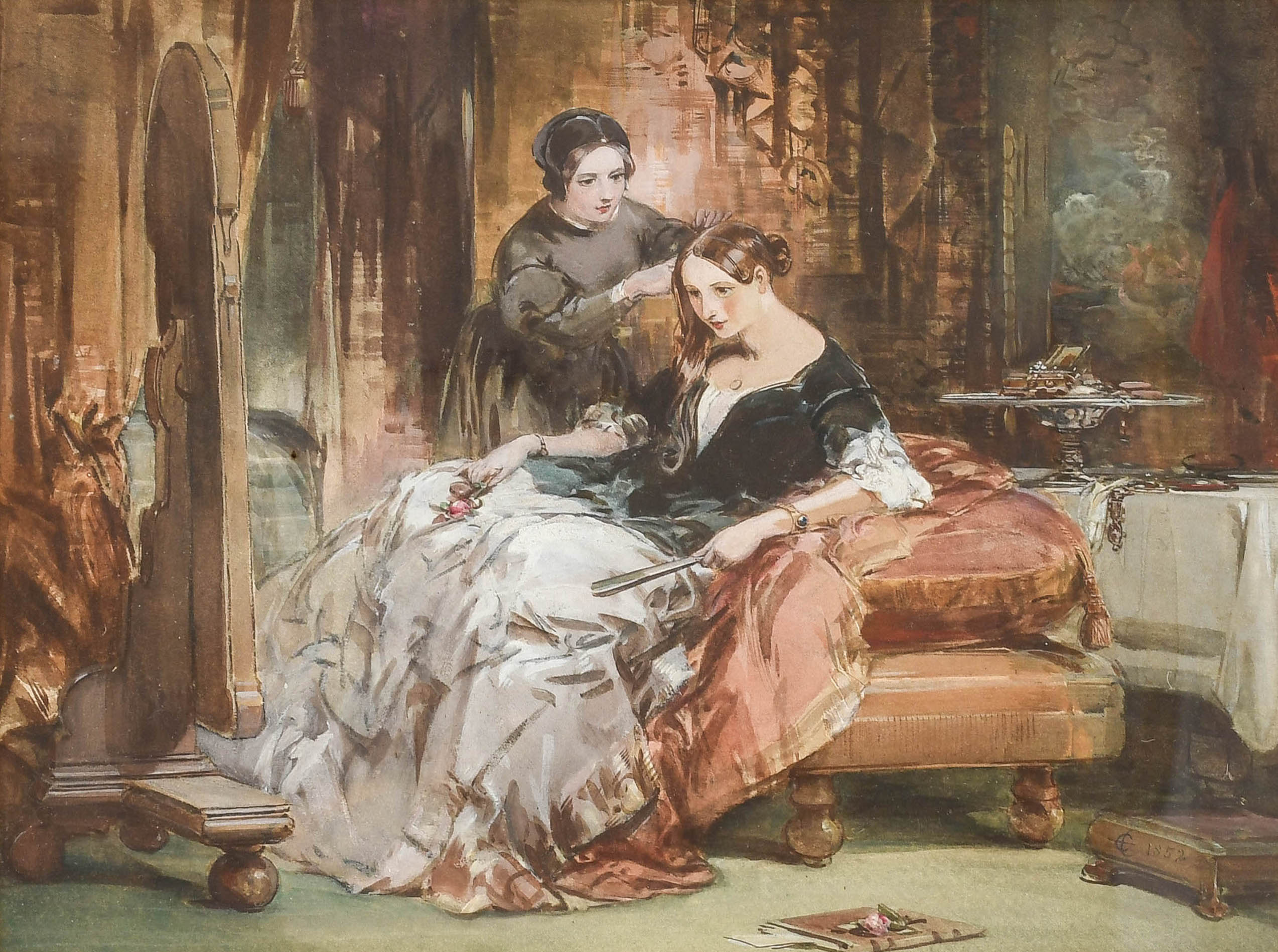
Amy Robsart and her maid, watercolour, 1852, with the monogram and date on the footstool at right

He exhibited a total of 101 paintings at the Royal Watercolour Society, though with the numbers varying considerably from year to year. His contributions were highly valued by other members for the variety they gave to the walls, as a contrast to the landscapes which formed the great majority of exhibited subjects.

He very often returned to the same subject with compositions that were sometimes similar, but sometimes very different. Thus, the original lithograph that is Plate I of Cattermole's Portfolio of Drawings (see below), entitled Hamilton, of Bothwell haugh, lying in wait to assassinate the Regent Murray is very different from the two different watercolour versions of the subject in the Victoria and Albert Museum, and from another in the Ashmolean Museum, though all four show a single figure in a narrow room by a window, holding a gun. The 1911 Encyclopaedia Brittanica states that "Among his leading works are The Murder of the Bishop of Liege, The Armourer relating the Story of the Sword, The Assassination of the Regent Murray by Hamilton of Bothwellhaugh, and (in oil) A Terrible Secret, without saying which version of the second and third of these is meant.

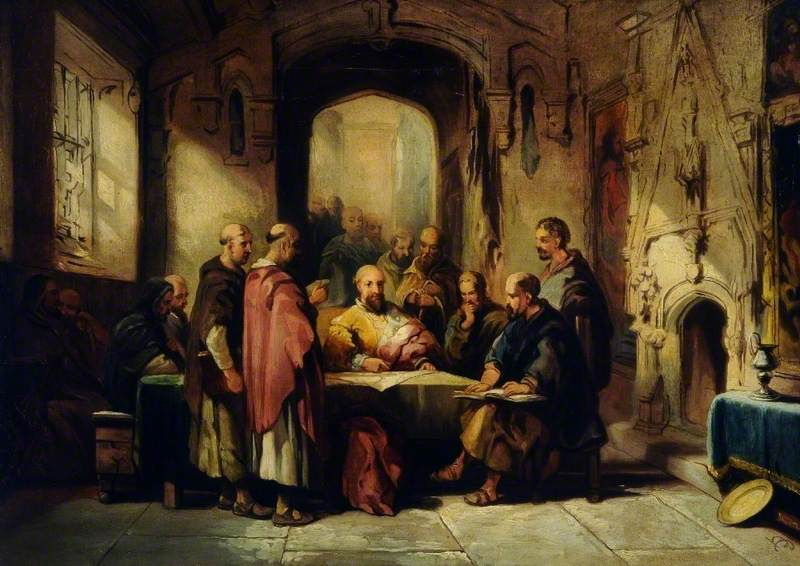
A Conference at the Monastery, in oils, but similar to many of his watercolours, Sheffield

Cattermole usually signed his watercolours (at least from the 1840s on) with a "GC" monogram, typically placed low on a piece of furniture or similar. A year date may be added, but he seems only to have started doing this around the end of the 1840s, and museums are not able to date most of their works (an exception is the V&A's The Silent Warning, dated 1837). This makes it difficult to evaluate Ruskin's claim of a falling off in quality in the years just before he wrote Modern Painters (1843). Others see the 1840s as his best period. Martin Hardie prefers some of his less finished works to those worked up for exhibition.

The number of paintings exhibited at the RWS slowed in the late 1840s, and then stopped entirely after the exhibition of 1850. The next year a note in the catalogue said this was due to illness, and there was some crisis in his health around Christmas in 1850. Cattermole tried painting in oils, but found the different touch difficult "his hand felt weighted by the task of dragging the more viscous medium, and he soon longed again for the freer play that he enjoyed when drawing in water-colours". According to Roget (who gives no dates) "he resumed the practice of water-colours. Withdrawn from the fashionable world and society, he devoted himself unceasingly to his art, often working at his easel from early morn to late at night." But these paintings were not exhibited, and presumably sold direct to collectors.

James Hamilton of Bothwellhaugh about to shoot the Regent Murray, at Linlithgow, on 23rd January 1570

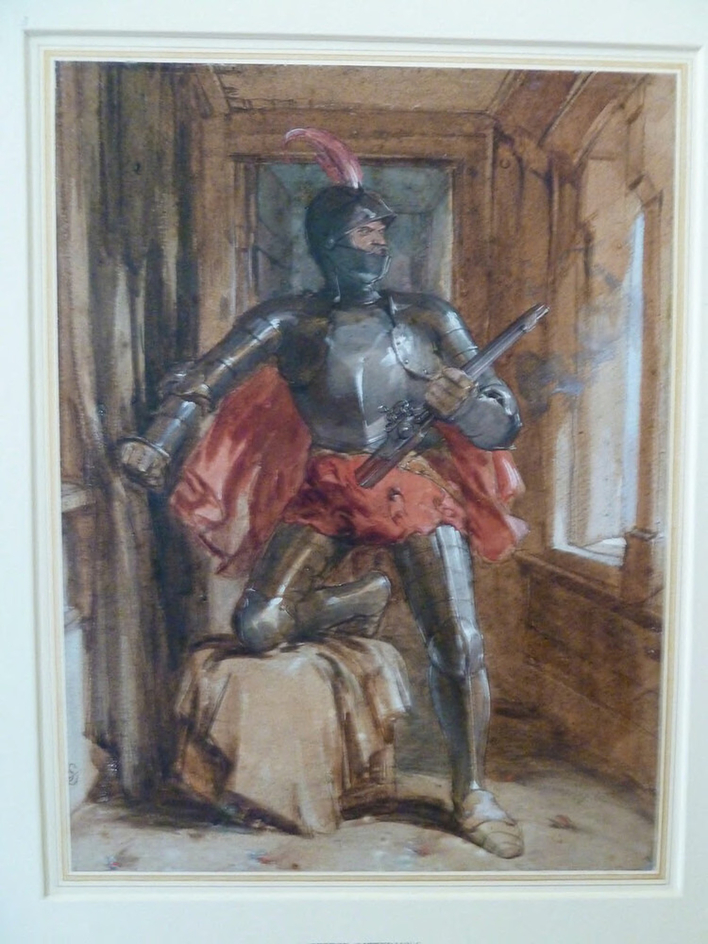
Watercolour, 1833, Ashmolean Museum

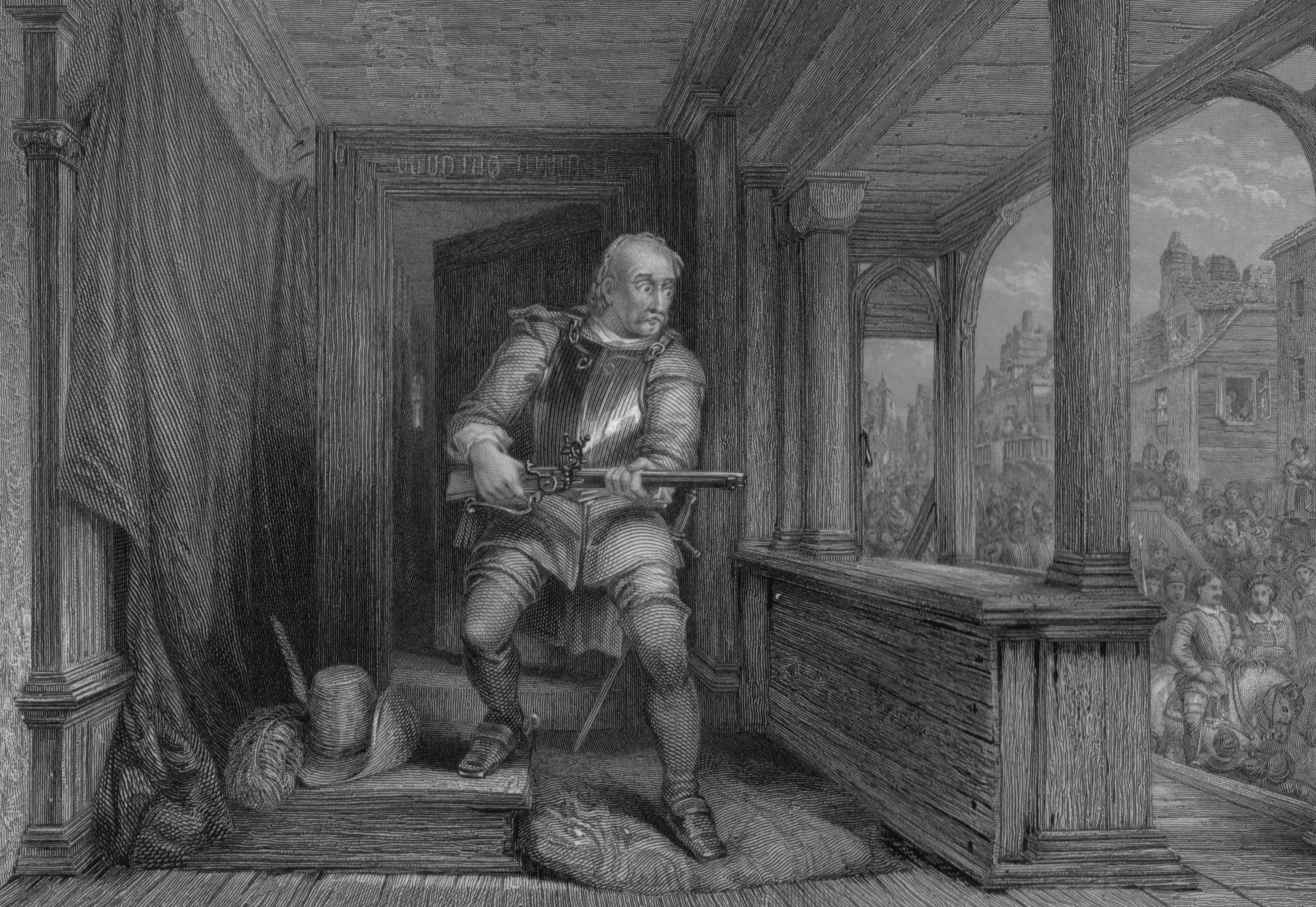
Book illustration, 1835.

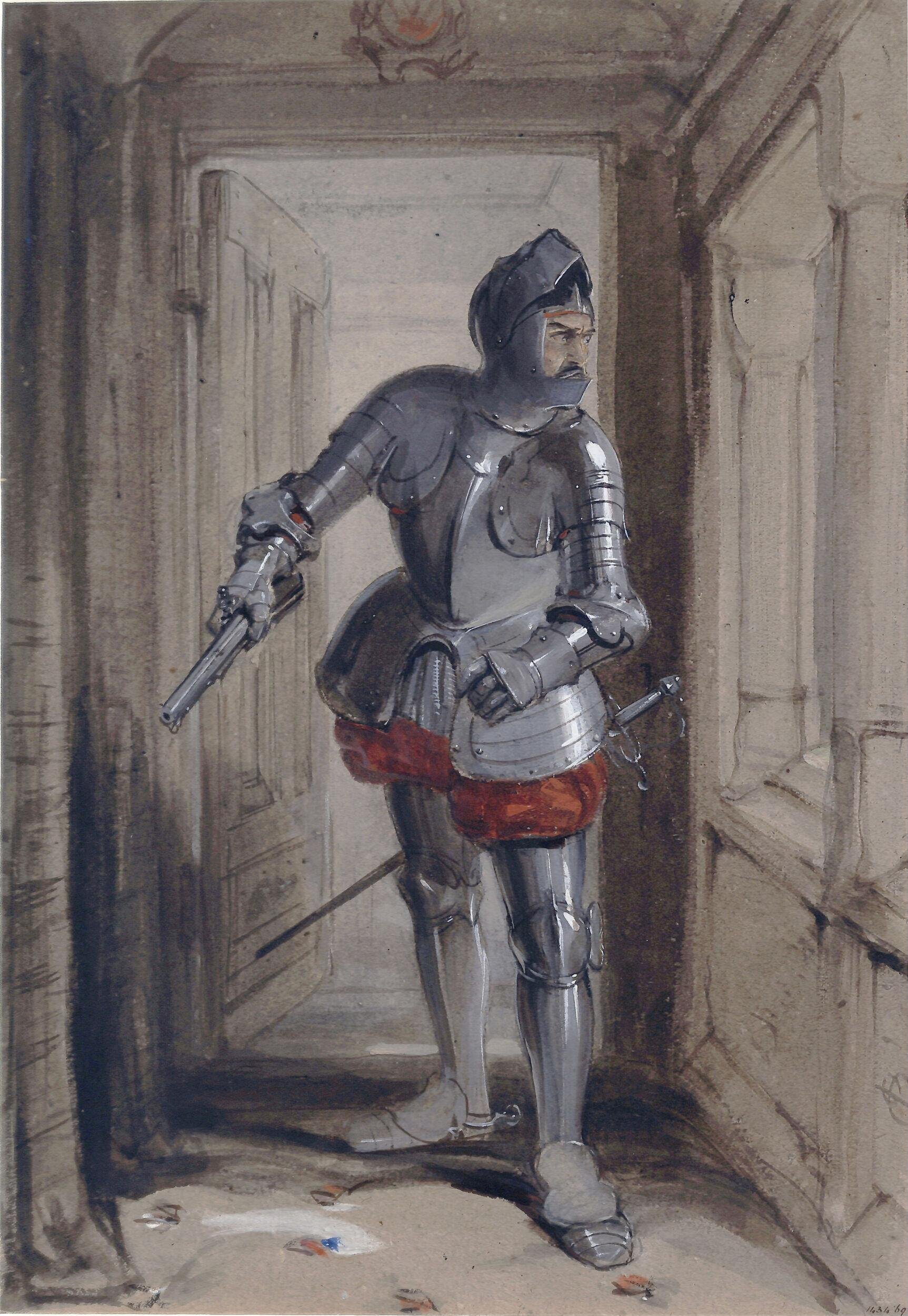
V&A

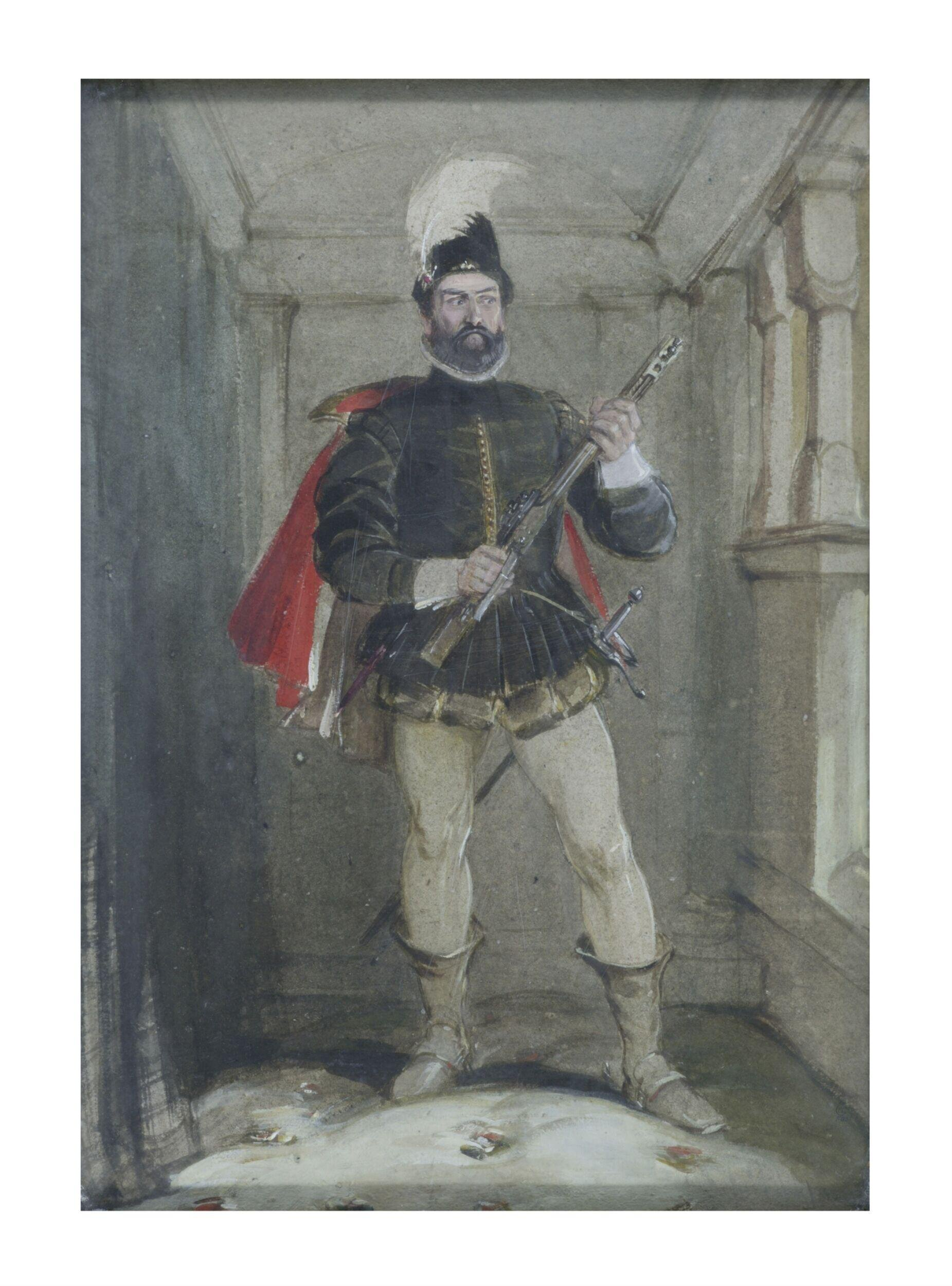
V&A

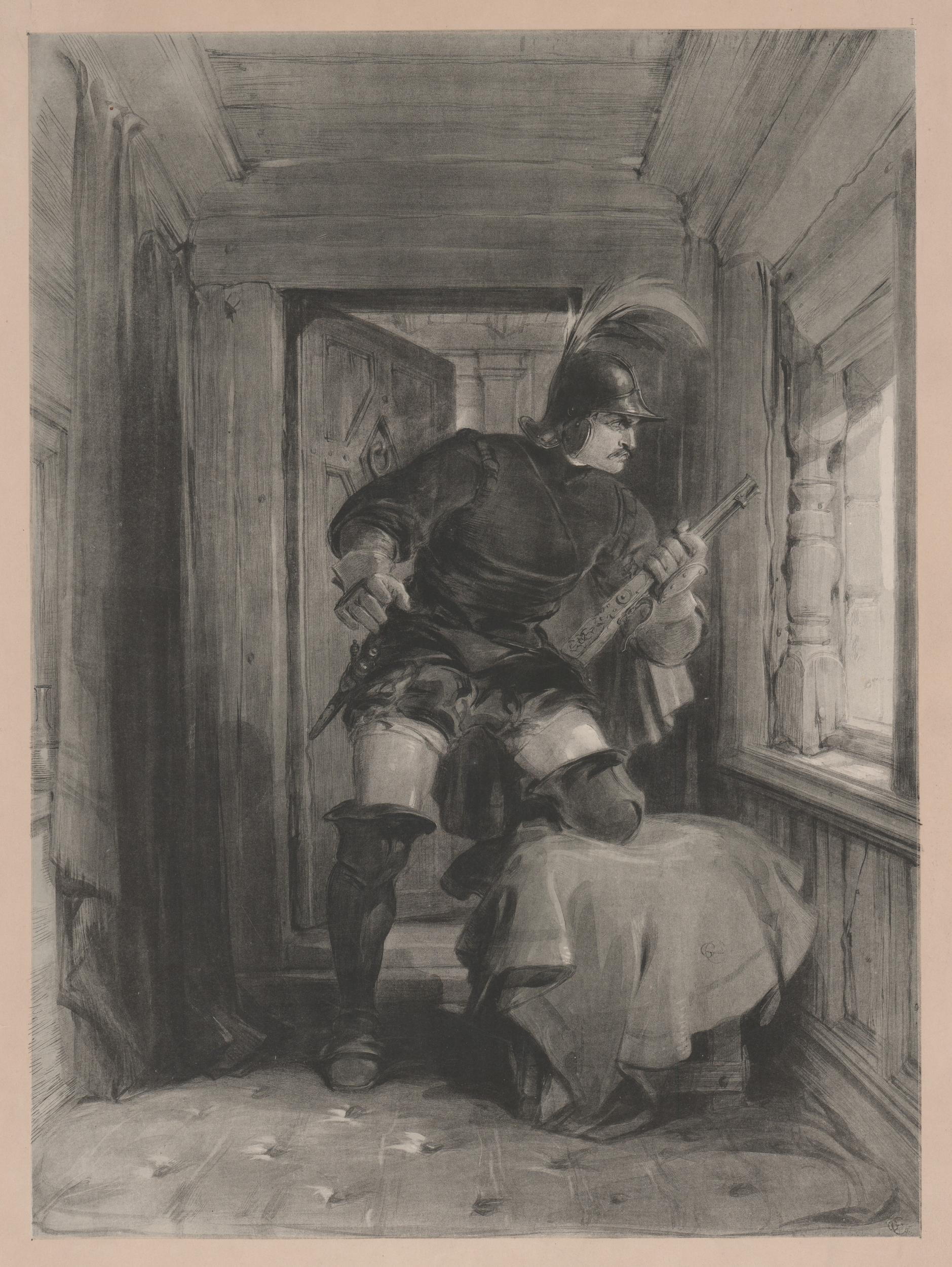
Lithograph, 1848

=== Prints ===
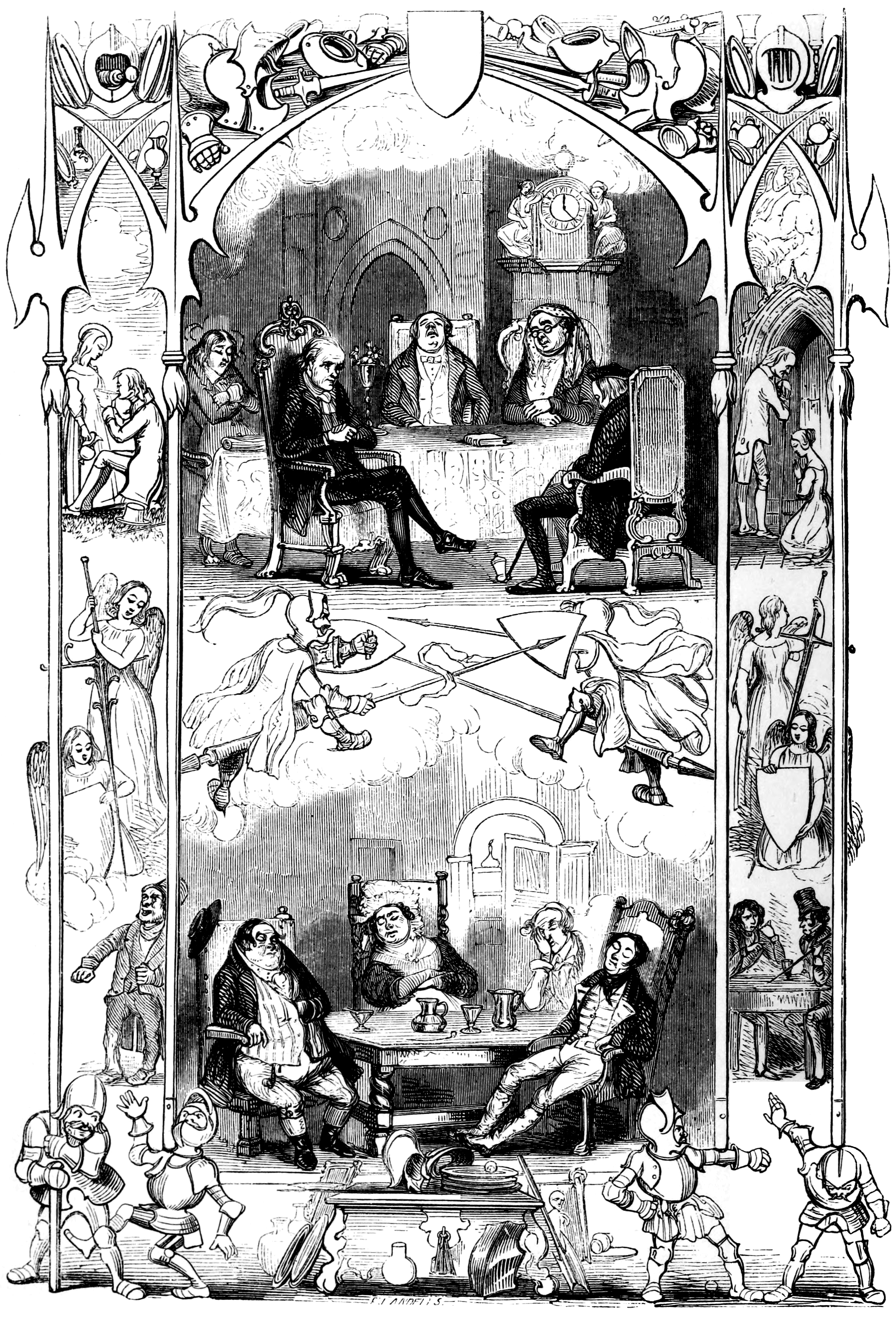
Frontispeace to The Old Curiosity Shop by Charles Dickens, 1841

At the start of his career he was often employed by publishers, beginning by illustrating some of the Cathedral Antiquities of England produced by John Britton, and later some of the Waverley Novels by Walter Scott and the Historical Annual of his brother Richard Cattermole (his scenes from the wars of Cavaliers and Roundheads in this series are among his best engraved works), and many other volumes besides. He collaborated with Hablot Knight Browne, or "Phiz", on illustrations for Dickens's The Old Curiosity Shop, and Barnaby Rudge. Cattermole specialized in rendering scenes of chivalry, of medievalism, and generally of the romantic aspects of the past.

His paintings were often engraved (or turned into lithographs etc) and in 1846 an anthology of 24 reproductions called Cattermole Gems was published, with various engravers including William Brandard, Charles Rolls, and James Tibbits Willmore. Survivals have often been mounted separately, and were no doubt treated as pictures to frame and hang. In December 1848 a further set of prints were published as Cattermole's Portfolio of Drawings, which were all lithographs described as "all Originals, and painted by George Cattermole, on Stones, from which a number of Copies have been struck by the process of Lithotinte". The bound folios were 4 guineas plain, 6 for "proof copies" mounted, and 10 if coloured and mounted.

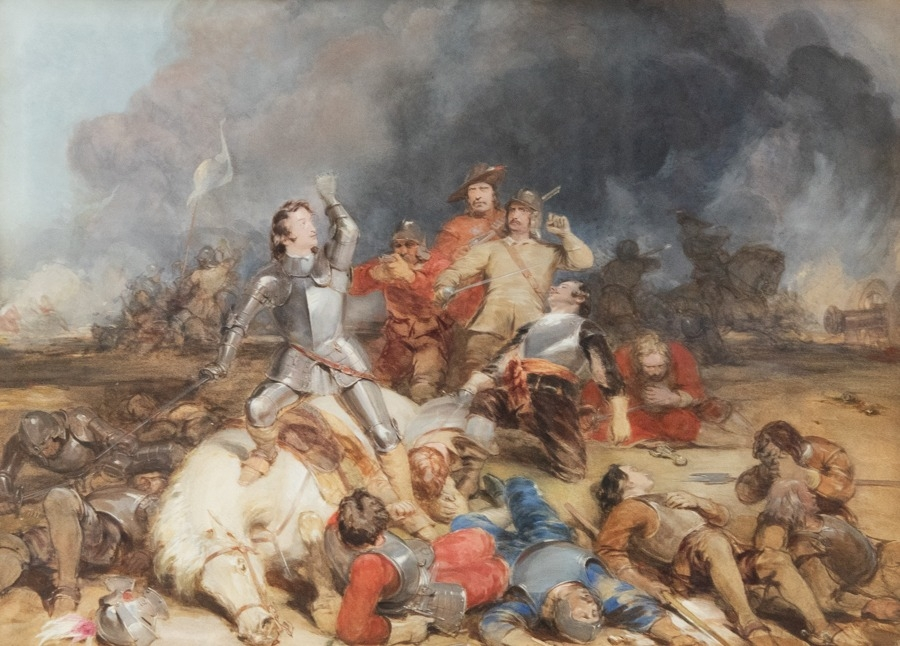
Battle of Hopton Heath, 1643, with Spencer Compton, 2nd Earl of Northampton refusing quarter.

The subjects were (as titled in the advertisement for the set):

No. 1. Hamilton, of Bothwell haugh, lying in wait to assassinate the Regent Murray. Hist. Scotland
2. Weighing a Scruple - The Sentinel's Temptation.
3. Landscape - An Arrow from an unseen hand has delivered the Knight from a treacherous Ambush.
4. Scene from "The Giaour". --- "despair, Is mightier than my pious prayer."
5. The Dragon-slayer.
6. The departure of the Knight to the Combat.
7. The Convent Door - Distribution of Alms.
8. The Abbot's Apartment - Reading the Scripture.
9. Salvator Rosa studying amongst the Brigands and Outlaws of the Abruzzi.
10. Wanderers Welcomed - A Scene of Old English Hospitality.
11. The Monk's Refectory - Saying Grace.
12. The Dwarf's Treachery - Secure in the Senechal's heavy slumber, he conducts the Stranger to the Castle Hall.

Several of these subjects had been painted by Cattermole, but the lithographs seem to use different compositions (see No 1 described above)

Like other artists of the day, his print output included worked up sketches by amateurs who had travelled to exotic places, for works such as "Views in India, China, and on the Shores of the Red Sea: drawn by Prout, Stanfield, Cattermole, Purser, Cox, Austen, &c. from original sketches by Commander R. Elliott ... With descriptions by Emma Roberts". Cattermole himself never left Britain.

== Legacy ==
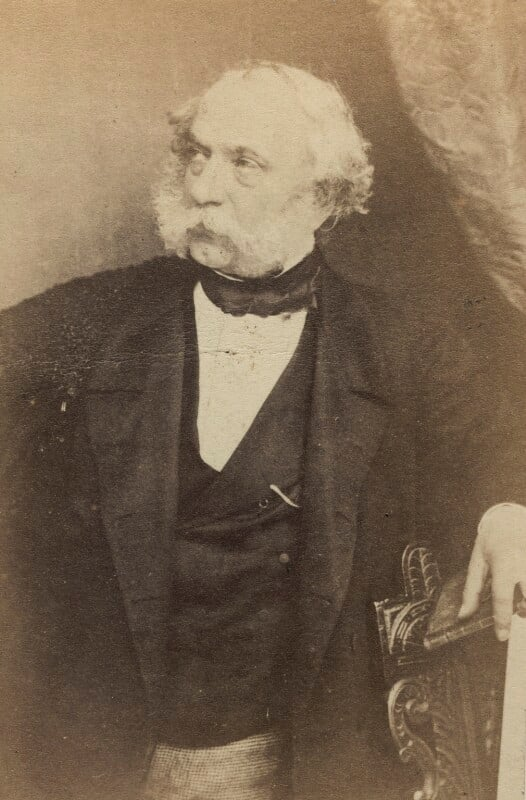
Cattermole in the 1860s

Cattermole's works achieved their highest ever prices (adjusting for inflation) at auction in the 1870s, with a number of paintings selling at Christie's for over £400, though the typical price was about half this, or less. Possibly the last exhibition ever dedicated to Cattermole was held at the London gallery Vokins in 1889, and enthusiastically reviewed by George Bernard Shaw for The World, writing "The generation that knows not Cattermole should hurry to Great Portland Street to repair its ignorance.

His reputation remained high at this period; commenting on the controversy stirred up by James Orrock's push in 1890 to get the national museums to show more British art, The Speaker complained in passing that the National Gallery, London "half-secretes the peerless watercolours of Turner, De Wint, and Cattermole in semi-subterranean rooms, lighted, when the day is fine, by side-windows ...".

Art UK records nearly 400 works in British museums; of which the Victoria and Albert Museum has the largest collection, including "242 sheets of studies of historical costume" most with many small sketches on each sheet, belying Ruskin's claim that he never made such studies, although they are generally treatments of historical costume, rather than studies of the fall of drapery.
