= Rushall, Norfolk =

Village in Norfolk, England

Coordinates: 52.396501°N 1.185107°E

Rushall
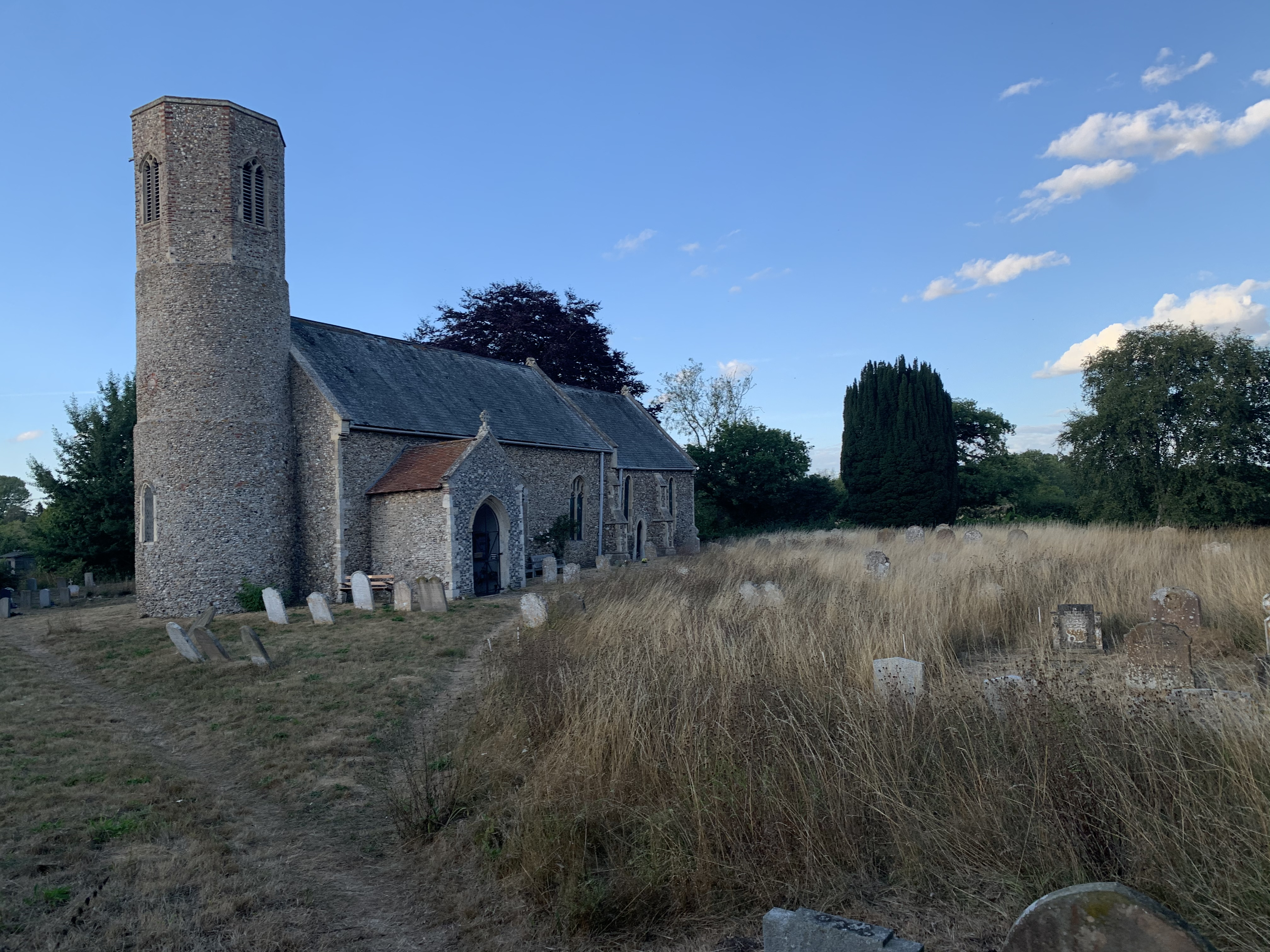
- St Mary’s Church

- Location within Norfolk
- Civil parish: Dickleburgh and Rushall
- District: South Norfolk
- Shire county: Norfolk
- Region: East
- Country: England
- Sovereign state: United Kingdom
- Post town: DISS
- Postcode district: IP21
- Dialling code: 01379
- Police: Norfolk
- Fire: Norfolk
- Ambulance: East of England
- UK Parliament: Waveney Valley

Rushall is a village and former civil parish, now in the parish of Dickleburgh and Rushall, in the South Norfolk district, in the county of Norfolk, England. In 1931 the parish had a population of 176.

The church of Rushall St Mary the Virgin is one of 124 existing round-tower churches in Norfolk.

== Toponymy ==
The name 'Rushall' means perhaps, 'Rif's nook of land' or the first element may be Old English 'hrif', 'belly/womb', used in some topographical sense.

== History ==
The village used to be its own civil parish until it merged with Dickleburgh on 1 April 1935, the parish is now called Dickleburgh and Rushall.
