= Tbilisi International Festival of Theatre =

- Location: Tbilisi, Georgia; 41°43′21″N 44°47′33″E
- Founded: 2009
- Festival date: September — October
- Language: International
- Website: www.tbilisiinternational.com

The Tbilisi International Festival of Theatre (Georgian: თბილისის საერთაშორისო თეატრალური ფესტივალი) is an international theatre festival in Tbilisi, the capital of Georgia. The festival was founded by the Tbilisi Municipality through the initiative of the mayor of Tbilisi Gigi Ugulava in 2009.

The festival, one of the major international cultural events in Tbilisi, runs annually at the end of September and beginning of October. It has been a member of the European Festivals Association since 2011.
