= Juventafest =

- Location: Sarajevo, Bosnia and Herzegovina
- Founded: 2013
- Founded by: Jasna Diklić
- Selector: Asja Krsmanović
- Festival date: September
- Website: www.juventafest.ba

Juventafest is an international theatre festival that takes place annually in Sarajevo, Bosnia and Herzegovina. It exclusively programs high school theatre productions and is held in September. The festival was established in 2013 by a group of Bosnian theatre professionals headed by acclaimed actress Jasna Diklić. It also organizes various workshops and interactive lectures aimed at high school drama groups, amateur student actors and high school drama teachers. It has hosted theatre productions from over 30 countries.
