= Metropolis Asia =

Annual Indian arts, crafts and music festival

Coordinates: 26.1833°N 91.7333°E

METROPOLIS Urban Winter Festival
- Genre: Art, Culture, Music, Literature
- Dates: January
- Location: Guwahati India
- Years active: 2013–present
- Founders: Ranjan Engti (Founding Director) Chombay Kee (Festival Chairman)
- Website: www.metropolisasia.com

"Metropolis": Urban Winter Festival is an annual arts, craft and music festival held in the month of January in Guwahati. It is a 3 day long festival. Metropolis is a collaboration of creative talents from India and other parts of the world. Founded in the year 2011 by the artist Ranjan Engti, the festival recognizes and showcases the work people in the field of music, arts, photography, craft, literature, film making, gaming and fashion.

== History ==
The 5th edition of Metropolis witnessed the participation of the Himalayan Kingdom of Bhutan as the "Focus Country", thereby showcasing its socio-cultural heritage to the people of Guwahati. During the lockdown they released Artyard (The celebration of Art- Verse- City) with the versatile D'Passion Collective mentor Sattyakee D'com Bhuyan

== Editions ==
Year	Date	Footfall	Key attractions	Theme
2017	6, 7 and 8 January	2.56 lakh	Bhutan (As focus country) Red Bull Tour Bus "Juke Box" Concert.	Vintage Vigor
2016	8, 9 and 10 January	1.87 lakh	Felicitation to young achievers of Northeast India. Collaboration with State Youth Festival. More than 45 cultural troops had participated during 3 days of the festival. Bombay Basement, Pink Noise, Sakina Khan, Tritha Electric. The "AQUA STAGE"	Aqua Kingdom
2015	9, 10 and 11 January	1.30 lakh	Lama Tashi (Grammy Nominee from Northeast)	
2014	10, 11 and 12 January	80,000	Santanu Hazarika (World Doodle Art Winner 2014 ) Papon, Soulmate, Tetseo-Sisters, Your-Chin, Guru Rewben Mashangva, Omak Kamut Collective, Ganesh Talkies.	
2013	11, 12 and 13 January	45,000	Zoya Akhtar (renowned Indian film director and screenwriter), Reema Kagti (renowned Indian film director and screenwriter) Anusha Rizvi (Director of Peepli Live)	

== Sponsors and Past Associates ==
Metropolis have been sponsored by OIL, ONGC, NRL, Vodafone SuperNet 4G, Red Bull, Pepsi MTV Indies, Spicejet, Airtel, Idea, SBI, LIC, Sony, Panasonic, Mahindra.

Metropolis have also received support from various departments of the Government of Assam:-

Dept. of Tourism, Govt. of Assam, Assam State Disaster Management Authority, Guwahati Municipal Corporation, Guwahati Metropolitan Development Authority, District Disaster Management Authority, Kamrup Metro, Sports & Youth Welfare Department, Govt. of Assam
