= International Festival of Children's Theatres =

The Subotica International Festival of Children's Theatres is an international festival dedicated to children's theatre.

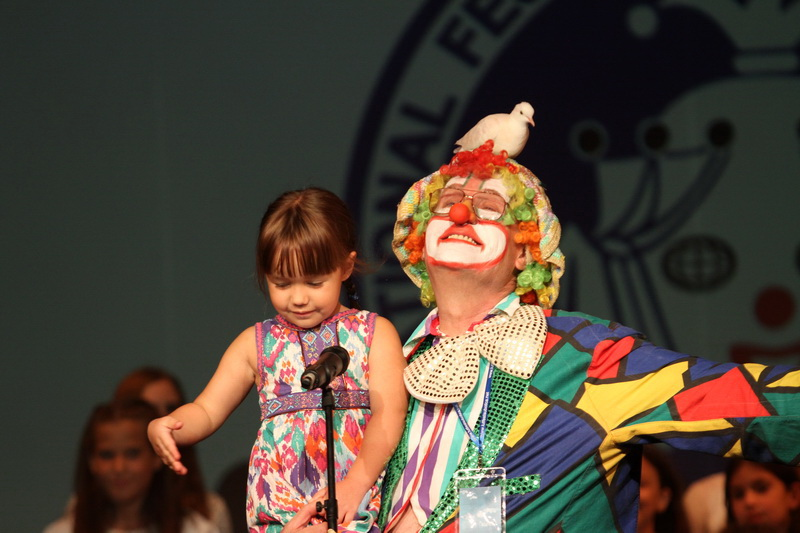
23rd Subotica International Children's Theatre Festival opening ceremony in Subotica Children's Theatre on Sunday 25 September 2016. – Iva and Arsa from Mars opening the festival.

== The festival ==
The festival is held annually in the third week of the month of May. It is of a competitive nature and festival awards are granted according to the evaluation of an international five-member jury. Both drama and puppet theatre productions are performed at the festival.

The official selection consists of twenty theatre performances in competition.

Besides official selections, the festival includes an accompanying programme encompassing street theatre, outdoor performances, festival performances throughout Serbia and in neighbouring Hungary, a film programme, scientific gatherings, exhibitions, puppetry workshops and publishing.

=== History ===
The festival was founded in 1994 by Subotica Municipal Assembly (Vojvodina Province, Serbia). The creator of the festival and its manager (director and selector) to the present has been Slobodan Markovic. Since 2006 he has been working together with Olivera Mudrinić, current Executive Director.

The festival is held under the auspices of the Ministry of Culture of the Republic of Serbia and the Provincial Department of Education and Culture. It is supported by the Municipality of Subotica and by numerous sponsors and donors. Executive producer of the festival is Subotica Open University.

The Ministry of Culture of the Republic of Serbia has proclaimed the festival as being of national significance, and for its accomplishments it has been awarded the greatest cultural acknowledgement in the Republic of Serbia – Vuk's Award.

=== Aims ===
The stated aims of the festival are to:

- present the most valuable and artistically most relevant stage creations in domestic and foreign production for children.
- contribute to promotion of new and to further recognition of already realized cultural values on the international ground.
- bring nations closer and to preserve diversities of each culture as the source of our common wealth.
- encourage making friendships.
- provide exchange of experiences and to make creative connections.
- promote theatrical life for children and culture in general.
- provide the audience in Serbia with various international productions for children and youth of different age and social status.

=== Target audience ===
Theatre artists and theoreticians; children up to 18 years of age; childminders, parents, carers and practitioners; everyone interested in theatre for children and young people, puppet theatre, or in the art of theatre in general.

=== Festival awards ===
The following awards are made:

1. Grand Prix for the best performance
2. Best direction
3. Best stage design
4. Best original music
5. Best puppet design
6. Five equal prizes for acting skills

Each year the festival presents "Little Prince" Life Achievement Awards to individuals who have made exceptional contributions to the development of culture and theatre art for children.

== Participants ==
Since its inception, the Festival has hosted more than 500 theatre productions from various parts of the world, including Europe and host country Serbia. About 400 have been presented in Official Selection, including:

Albania

- National Puppet Theatre, Tirana (2004)

Armenia

- State Puppet Theatre named after Hovhannes Tumanyan, Yerevan (2011)

Australia

- Sydney Puppet Theatre, Sydney (2017)

Austria

- MOKI Theatre, Vienna (2003, 2005, 2007, 2008)
- Puppet Theatre Trittbrettl, Pressbaum (2006)
- Karin Schäfer Figure Theatre, Neusiedl am See (2009, 2013)

Belarus

- Belarusian Theatre "Lialka", Vitebsk (1999, 2000, 2010)
- Mogilev Regional Puppet Theatre, Mogilev (2001)
- Minsk Regional Puppet Theatre "Batleyka", Molodechno (2003)
- Belarusian State Puppet Theatre, Minsk (2004)
- The Brest Puppet Theatre, Brest (2006, 2010)
- The Grodno Puppet Theatre, Grodno (2007, 2008, 2013)

Bosnia and Herzegovina

- Puppet Theatre, Mostar (2000, 2001, 2004, 2007)
- Puppet Theatre – Mostar, Mostar (2002)
- SARTR – Sarajevo War Theatre, Sarajevo (2003, 2005)
- Puppetry Studio Sarajevo & SARTR Theatre, Sarajevo (2016)
- Children's Theatre of Republic of Srpska, Banja Luka (1996, 1998, 1999, 2000, 2006, 2008, 2009, 2011, 2012)

Brazil

- Opera na Mala Company, São Paulo (2011)

Bulgaria

- State Puppet Theatre, Silistra (1994)
- Central Puppet Theatre, Sofia (1998, 1999, 2005)
- Theatre "Atelie 313", Sofia (2004, 2007, 2009, 2011)
- State Puppet Theatre, Plovdiv (1995)
- State Puppet Theatre, Varna (1996, 2006)
- State Puppet Theatre, Vidin (1997, 2001, 2010, 2013)
- Konstantin Velichkov Drama And Puppet Theatre, Pazardzhik (2000, 2002, 2003)
- Vessel Theatre, Veliko Tarnovo (2014)
- Aladdin Theatre, Sofia (2017)

Canada

- Ombres Folles, Montreal (2016)

Chile

- David Zuazola Puppet Company, Santiago (2012)

China

- Marionette Theatre, Chaozhou (2000)
- Dandelion – The Chinese Children Puppeteer Troupe, Zhangzhou (2005)
- Zhangzhou Puppet Theatre (2006)
- Shanghai Puppet Theatre, Shanghai (2007)

Colombia

- Madretierra Theatrical Foundation, Palmira (2016)

Croatia

- Branko Mihaljević Children's Theatre, Osijek (2000, 2001, 2016)
- Zagreb Puppet Theatre, Zagreb (2002, 2003, 2004, 2006, 2008, 2009, 2011, 2015)
- Rijeka City Puppet Theatre, Rijeka (2005, 2008, 2013)
- Split City Puppet Theatre, Split (2007)
- Mala Scena Theatre, Zagreb (2012)
- Točka na i (Dotting the i), Zagreb (2017)

Czech Republic

- Puppet Theatre On The King's Road, Prague (1996)
- Drak Theatre, Hradec Králové (2003, 2005)
- The Naive Theatre, Liberec (2006)
- Alfa Theatre, Plzeň (2007, 2009)
- Pavel Vangeli – Actor and Puppets, Prague (2010)
- South Bohemian Theatre, České Budějovice (2011)

Egypt

- Cairo Puppet Theatre, Cairo (2012)

Estonia

- Estonian State Puppet Theatre, Tallinn (2006, 2008)
- Tuuleveski (Windmill) Theatre, Jõhvi (2014)

Finland

- Puppet Theatre Sampo, Helsinki (1996, 2003)

France

- Theatre Du Petit Miroir, Paris (2006)
- Pointure 23 Theatre, Paris (2007)
- Garin Trousseboeuf Company, Savenay (2008)
- Barbara Mélois, Charleville-Mézières (2009)
- Turak Theatre, Lyon (2010)
- Jean-Pierre Lescot Company, Fontenay-sous-Bois (2011)
- Bouffou Théâtre, Hennebont (2012)
- Le Lutin Company, Balma (2013)

Georgia

- Batumi Puppet and Youth Professional State Theatre, Batumi (2014)

Germany

- Magdeburg Puppet Theatre, Magdeburg (1996)
- Waidspeicher Theatre, Erfurt (1998)
- Puppet Theatre, Erfurt (2003)
- Das Weite Theater, Berlin (2000, 2011)
- Maer (Fairy Tale) Theatre, Hamburg (2002)
- Theaterwerkstatt (Theatre Workshop), Hanover (2004)
- Handgemenge Theatre, Berlin (2007)
- Theater des Lachens, Frankfurt (Oder) (2015)

Greece

- Puppet Theatre Tiritomba, Larissa (1999, 2000)
- Marionette Company, Vasiliki (2005)
- Hop Signor Puppet Theatre, Athens (2015)

Hungary

- "Kolibri" Theatre, Budapest (1994, 1995, 1999)
- Budapest Puppet Theatre, Budapest (1996, 1997, 2003, 2005, 2007, 2008, 2010, 2013, 2014)
- Hattyu-Dal (Swan's Song) Theatre, Budapest (2002)
- Levendula Theatre, Pécs (1998)
- Ciroka Puppet Theatre, Kecskemét (2000, 2004, 2012)
- Vojtina Puppet Theatre, Debrecen (2001, 2006)
- Kövér Béla Puppet Theatre, Szeged (2008, 2010, 2012)
- Bóbita Puppet Theatre, Pécs (2009, 2013, 2017)
- Inversedance – Zoltan Fodor Company, Budapest (2015)
- Griff Puppet Theatre, Zalaegerszeg (2017)

India

- Vinod Bhatt & Party, Jaipur, Rajasthan (2014)
- The Katkatha Puppet Arts Trust, New Delhi (2015)

Iran

- Apple Tree Group, Tehran (2007)
- Ariya Theatre, Tehran (2011)
- Deemak Theatre, Tehran (2017)

Israel

- "Koom-Koom" Theatre, Jerusalem (2006)
- The Galilee Multicultural Theatre, DN Merom Hagalil (2009)
- The Orna Porat Theatre for Children and Youth, Tel Aviv (2010)

Italy

- Piccoli Di Podrecca, Trieste (2003)
- Di Pietro – Colombaioni, Rome (2000)
- Teatro Dei Piedi, Rome (2006)
- Tieffeu – Teatro Figura Umbro, Perugia (2002)
- Giullare Little Theatre, Bologna (2005)
- Figli D'arte (Children Of Art) Cuticchio, Palermo (1998)
- Zaches Theatre, Scandicci (2011, 2015)
- Teatro Verde Company, Rome (2012)
- La Capra Ballerina, Acquapendente (2013)

Japan / Czech Republic

- Nori Sawa's Art Theatre, Sapporo / Prague (2009)

Japan

- Yuki☆Puppet Works, Kamakura (2013)
- Theatre Genre : Gray = Grotesque by Egoistic Objects and Servantlike Bodies, Tokyo (2014, 2015)

Kazakhstan

- Alakay Puppet Theatre, Aktobe (2011)

Latvia

- Latvian State Puppet Theatre, Riga (2005)

Lithuania

- Puppet Theatre, Kaunas (2002)
- Vilnius Theatre "Lele", Vilnius (2005)

Republic of Macedonia

- Children And Youth Theatre, Skopje (1996, 1997, 1998, 1999, 2000, 2002, 2005, 2009, 2012, 2013)

Mexico

- Muf Theatre, Mexico City (1996)
- La Cucaracha Puppet Theatre, Jalisco (2015)

Moldova

- Marionette Theatre, Chişinău (2001)
- Republican Puppet Theatre "Licurici", Chişinău (2004)

Montenegro

- Children's Theatre, Podgorica (1994, 1997, 1999)
- Podgorica City Theatre, Podgorica (2001, 2014, 2015, 2016)
- Theatre of Nikšic, Nikšic (2000)

Norway

- The Puppet Theatre of the Cat, Tønsberg (2015)

Peru / Great Britain

- Jose Navarro, Lima / London (2011)

Poland

- "Guliwer" Puppet Theatre, Warsaw (1996, 2005, 2008, 2013)
- "Rabcio" State Puppet Theatre, Rabka (1995, 1998, 2000)
- Opole Puppet Theatre, Opole (1997)
- Actor And Puppet Theatre, Łomża (1999, 2008, 2015)
- Conieco Puppet Theatre, Białystok (2001, 2004)
- Tecza Puppet Theatre, Słupsk (2002)
- Animation Theatre, Poznań (2003)
- Maska Theatre, Rzeszów (2006, 2009, 2010)
- K3 Theatre, Białystok (2007)
- Olsztyn Puppet Theatre, Olsztyn (2011)
- The Puppet and Actor Theatre of Wałbrzych (2012)
- Białystok Puppet Theatre, Białystok (2014)
- "Baj" Theatre, Warsaw (2016)

Romania

- Puppet Theatre "Colibri", Craiova (1994, 2003, 2004, 2006)
- National Theatre Craiova (2006)
- "Tândărica" Puppet Theatre, Bucharest (1995, 1996, 2010, 2012)
- Ariel Theatre, Târgu Mureş (1997, 2011, 2016)
- Gong Theatre, Sibiu (1999)
- "Vasilache" Puppet Theatre, Botoşani (2001)
- Csiky Gergely State Theatre, Timișoara (2002)
- Baia Mare Puppet Theatre, Baia Mare (2005, 2009)
- Puck Puppet Theatre, Cluj-Napoca (2007, 2017)
- Arlechino Children's Theater, Brașov (2008)
- Hungarian Theatre – Lilliput Troupe, Oradea (2011)
- Prichindel Puppet Theatre, Alba Iulia (2012)
- Ilona Hrestic, Bucharest (2014)
- Ioan Slavici Classical Theatre, Arad (2015)
- Ion Creanga Theatre, Bucharest (2016)

Russia

- "N.P. Akimov" State Academic Comedy Theatre, Saint Petersburg (1994)
- "V. F. Kommissarzhevskaya" Drama Theatre, St. Petersburg (1995)
- Saint Petersburg State Children's Drama Theatre "On the Neva", Saint Petersburg (1996, 1999)
- "Kukolny Dom" ("Puppets' Home") Puppet Theatre, Saint Petersburg (2004)
- St. Petersburg "Sobachka" ("Little Stray Dog") Puppet Theatre, St. Petersburg (2006)
- Astrahan State Puppet Theatre, Astrahan (2000)
- "Kolobok" ("Little Round Bun") Puppet Theatre, Volgograd (2001, 2002, 2014)
- Murmansk Regional Puppet Theatre, Murmansk (2003)
- Puppet Theatre "Puppets And People", Moscow (2005)
- Kamchatka Regional Puppet Theatre, Petropavlovsk-Kamchatsky (2007)
- The Omsk State Theatre of Puppet, Actor and Mask "Arlekin", Omsk (2008)
- Saint Petersburg State Theatre of Musical Comedy, Saint Petersburg (2008)
- Penza Regional Puppet Theatre "Kukolny Dom", Penza (2009, 2010)
- Khakassian National Puppet Theatre "Skazka", Abakan (2009)
- Ekaterinburg Puppet Theatre, Ekaterinburg (2010)
- Sakhalin Puppet Theatre, Yuzhno-Sakhalinsk (2010)
- The Kalmyk Republic Theatre for Youth "Dzhangar", Elista (2010)
- Irkutsk Regional Puppet Theatre "Aistenok", Irkutsk (2011)
- Krasnoyarsk Puppet Theatre, Krasnoyarsk (2011)
- Belgorod State Puppet Theatre, Belgorod (2012)
- Kostroma Puppet Theatre, Kostroma (2012)
- Kursk State Puppet Theatre, Kursk (2012)
- Drama Theatre "On the Left Bank", Novosibirsk (2012)
- Theatre for the Young Audience of the Sakha Republic, Yakutsk (2012)
- Tomsk Puppet and Actor Theatre "Skomorokh", Tomsk (2013)
- Vologda Regional Puppet Theatre "Teremok", Vologda (2013, 2017)
- State Puppet Theatre "Ulger", Ulan-Ude (2013)
- Ivanovo Puppet Theatre, Ivanovo (2014)
- The Northern Stage Theatre, Novy Urengoy (2015)
- Samara Puppet Theatre, Samara (2015)
- "Karabaska" Theatre, Perm (2016)
- "Folding Giraffe" Theatre, Saint Petersburg (2016)
- The Tula State Puppet Theatre, Tula (2017)

Serbia

- ("Kurir Jovica") Children's Theatre, Subotica (1994 X 2, 1996, 1997, 1998, 1999, 2000, 2001, 2002, 2003, 2004, 2005, 2006, 2007, 2008, 2010, 2013, 2014, 2015, 2016, 2017)
- "Toša Jovanovic" National Theatre, Zrenjanin (1994, 1999, 2001, 2003, 2004, 2008, 2010, 2013)
- Youth Theatre, Novi Sad (1994, 2000, 2003, 2004, 2005, 2006, 2008, 2009, 2012, 2013, 2014, 2015, 2017)
- Serbian National Theatre, Novi Sad (2006, 2016)
- "Pinokio" Puppet Theatre, Zemun / Novi Beograd (1994, 1997, 1998, 2000, 2002, 2003, 2006, 2008, 2009, 2015, 2016)
- Little Theatre "Duško Radovic", Belgrade (1995, 2004, 2005, 2011, 2017)
- Boško Buha Theatre, Belgrade (1997, 2004, 2005)
- Little Theatre "Puž", Belgrade (2004)
- Puppet Theatre Pepino, Niš (2002)
- Niš Puppet Theatre, Niš (1994, 1999, 2002, 2003, 2006, 2007, 2008, 2012, 2013, 2017)
- National Theatre, Kikinda (2012)

Slovakia

- The Puppet Theatre, Nitra (1994, 2001)
- Old Theatre, Nitra (2005)
- Trnava Theatre, Trnava (1995)
- Bratislava Puppet Theatre, Bratislava (1996, 2003, 2006, 2008, 2017)
- Piki Theatre, Pezinok (1997)
- Theatre In A Suitcase, Košice (1999)
- Puppet Theatre, Košice (2000, 2009)
- Maškrta (Titbit) Theatre, Košice (2002, 2004)
- The Puppet Theatre At The Crossroads, Banská Bystrica (2007)
- Žilina Puppet Theatre, Žilina (2010)

Slovenia

- Woodshed Puppet Studio, Ljubljana (2001)
- Mini Theatre, Ljubljana (2002, 2004, 2010, 2012, 2013, 2014, 2016)
- Puppet Theatre, Maribor (2003)
- Konj Puppet Theatre, Ljubljana (2007)
- Matita Theatre, Koper (2008)
- Ljubljana Puppet Theatre (2009, 2015, 2016)
- Zavod Federacija Ljubljana (2010)
- Forum Ljubljana (2011)
- Glej Theatre, Ljubljana (2013)

Spain

- Puppet Theatre "El Retablo", Madrid (2006)
- Fernan Cardama's Company, Alcalá la Real, Andalucia (2007)
- Cia. Jordi Bertran, Barcelona (2009)
- Dejabu Panpin Laborategia, Pasaia (2010)
- El Teatre de L'Home Dibuixat, Castellón de la Plana (2012)

Sweden

- Spektaklet Theatre, Uppsala (2002)
- Staffan Björklund's Theatre, Kävlinge (2007)

Switzerland

- Pannalal's Puppets, Vessey / Geneve (1995, 1997, 1999, 2002, 2003)

Turkey

- Traditional Turkish Shadow Puppet Theatre "Karagoz", Bursa (2003)
- Istanbul Shadow Theatre, Istanbul (2006)
- Flying Hands Puppet Theatre, Lüleburgaz (2011)

Ukraine

- Kyiv State Young Spectator’S Theatre "On Lipki", Kyiv (2000)
- Transcarpathian Regional Puppet Theatre "Bavka", Uzhhorod (2002, 2003, 2009, 2014)
- Uzhhorod Puppet Theatre, Uzhhorod (2005)
- Rivne Regional Puppet Theatre, Rivne (2004)
- Puppet Theatre Donetsk (2006)
- Poltava Regional Puppet Theatre, Poltava (2007)

United Kingdom

- Traditional English Theatre "Mr Punch", Konrad Fredericks, London (2002, 2003)
- String Theatre Marionettes, London (2012)

United States

- Jim Gamble Puppet Productions, Los Angeles (2000, 2003, 2005)
- Masque Theater, Bethlehem, Connecticut (2006)
- Drama Of Works, Brooklyn, New York City (2007)

== Awards made ==
=== Festival Grand Prix ===
- 1994 – Russia. Academic Theatre of Comedy "N.P. Akimov" – St. Petersburg The Humpbacked Horse. Director: I. M. Makarov
- 1995 – Slovakia. Trnava Theatre – Trnava. Winter Tale. Director: Ladislav Kocan
- 1996 – Slovakia. State Puppet Theatre – Bratislava. Love Potion. Director: Jozef Bednarik
- 1997 – Hungary. Budapest Puppet Theatre – Budapest. Petrushka. Director: Kató Szőnyi
- 1998 – Yugoslavia. The Puppet Theatre "Pinokio" – Zemun. The Story of a Horse. Director: Živomir Jokovic
- 1999 – Belarus. Belarusian Theatre "Lialka" – Vitebsk. The Lost Soul, or Torment of a Sinner. Director: Oleg Zhugzhda
- 2000 – Macedonia. Children and Youth Theatre – Skopje. Set, Set (Bright Sun). Director: Bonjo Lungov
- 2001 – Bulgaria. State Puppet Theatre – Vidin. Petrushka. Director: Jana Cankova
- 2002 – Germany. Fairy Tale Theatre – Hamburg. The Queen of Colours. Director: Mark Lovic
- 2003 – Slovakia. Bratislava Puppet Theatre – Bratislava. The Nutcracker. Director: Jozef Bednarik
- 2004 – Hungary. The Puppet Theatre "Ciroka" – Kecskemét. Shadows. Director: Laszlo Rumi
- 2005 – Serbia and Montenegro. Children's Theatre – Subotica. The Poor Bootmaker and the Wind King. Director: Hernyak Gyorgy
- 2006 – Estonia. State Puppet Theatre – Tallinn. Troll-Boy. Director: Finn Poulsen
- 2007 – Austria. MOKI – Mobile Theatre for Children – Vienna. Cinderella. Director: Jakub Krofta
- 2008 – Estonia. Estonian State Puppet Theatre – Tallinn. Gamblers. Director: Yevgeny Ibragimov
- 2009 – Bosnia and Herzegovina. Children's Theatre of Republic of Srpska – Banja Luka. The Folklore Magic. Director: Bonjo Lungov
- 2010 – Hungary. Budapest Puppet Theatre – Budapest. Líra and Epika. Director: Pál Mácsai
- 2011 – France. Cie Jean-Pierre Lescot – Fontenay-sous-Bois. My Pinocchio. Director: Jean-Pierre Lescot
- 2012 – Slovenia. Mini Theatre – Ljubljana. Snow White. Director: Marek Bečka
- 2013 – Russia. Vologda Regional Puppet Theatre "Teremok" – Vologda. Carmen. Director: Boris Konstantinov
- 2014 – Hungary. Budapest Puppet Theatre – Budapest. Boribon and Annipanni. Director: Edina Ellinger
- 2015 – Serbia. Youth Theatre – Novi Sad. How Flying Was Invented. Director: Emilija Mrdaković
- 2016 – Montenegro. City Theatre Podgorica. The Tale of the Fisherman and the Fish. Director: Yevgeny Ibragimov
- 2017 – Russia. Vologda Regional Puppet Theatre "Teremok" – Vologda. The Story of Dionysius – The Icon Painter. Director: Oleg Zhugzhda

=== "Little Prince" Lifetime Achievement Award ===
The 7th Festival 2000

- Henryk Jurkowski – Poland
- Srboljub Lule Stankovic – Yugoslavia (Serbia)

The 8th Festival 2001

- Margareta Niculescu – Romania
- Milenko Misailovic – Yugoslavia (Serbia)

The 9th Festival 2002

- Josef Krofta – Czech Republic
- Hártig Sándor – Yugoslavia (Serbia)

The 10th Festival 2003

- Albrecht Roser – Germany
- Slobodan Markovic – Serbia and Montenegro

The 11th Festival 2004

- Radoslav Lazic – Serbia and Montenegro
- Meczner János – Hungary

The 12th Festival 2005

- Atanas Ilkov – Bulgaria
- Milena Jeftic Niceva Kostic – Serbia and Montenegro
- Živomir Jokovic – Serbia and Montenegro

The 13th Festival 2006

- Ljubivoje Ršumovic – Serbia and Montenegro
- Edi Majaron – Slovenia

The 14th Festival 2007

- Branko Milicevic – Serbia
- Viktor Klimchuk – Belarus
- Kemény Henrik – Hungary

The 15th Festival 2008

- Ripcó László – Serbia
- Jim Gamble – United States

The 16th Festival 2009

- Miroslav Radonjic – Serbia
- Vladimir Predmersky – Slovakia

The 17th Festival 2010

- Igor Bojović – Serbia
- Nikolay Naumov – Russia

The 18th Festival 2011

- Eustatiu Gregorian – Romania
- Irena Tot – Serbia

The 19th Festival 2012

- Luko Paljetak – Croatia
- Donka Špiček – Serbia

The 20th Festival 2013

- Eva Farkašová – Slovakia
- Predrag Bjelošević – Republic of Srpska, Bosnia and Herzegovina

The 21st Festival 2014

- Géza Balogh – Hungary
- Timothy John Byford – United Kingdom / Serbia

The 22nd Festival 2015

- Pancho Panchev – Bulgaria
- Minja Subota – Serbia

The 23rd Festival 2016

- Mimmo Cuticchio – Italy
- Zoran Hristić – Serbia

The 24th Festival 2017

- Boris Goldovsky – Russia
- Ljubica Beljanski-Ristić – Serbia

== Quotes ==
"It has been written about BITEF (Belgrade International Theatre Festival) in a Polish Encyclopaedia that the repertoire of this international Festival actually represents history of the world theatre of the second half of the 20th century. The same can be said about Subotica International Festival of Children's Theaters. Its fourteen seasons at the same time represent history of the world puppet theatre for children." Jovan Ćirilov, Festival Council President

"As a scientist and critic involved in activities of children's theatres all around the world I will take this opportunity to point out that the International Festival of Children's Theatres from Subotica has gained respect in the whole world, thanks to high artistic ranges, excellent organization and establishing of a forum for exchange of experiences in spirit of amicable cooperation..." Professor Henryk Jurkowski

== See also ==
- EFFE
- UNIMA
- ASSITEJ
- Serbian culture
