= What's done is done =

English idiom

"What's done is done" is an idiom in English, usually meaning something along the line of: the consequence of a situation is now out of your control, that is, "there's no changing the past, so learn from it and move on."

The expression uses the word "done" in the sense of "finished" or "settled", a usage which dates back to the first half of the 15th century.

== Etymology ==
One of the first-recorded uses of this phrase was by the character Lady Macbeth in Act 3, Scene 2 of the tragedy play Macbeth (early 17th century), by the English playwright William Shakespeare, who said: "Things without all remedy Should be without regard: what's done, is done" and "Give me your hand. What's done cannot be undone. – To bed, to bed, to bed!"

Shakespeare did not coin the phrase; it may actually be a derivative of the early 14th-century French proverb: Mez quant ja est la chose fecte, ne peut pas bien estre desfecte, which is translated into English as "But when a thing is already done, it cannot be undone". Some scholars have suggested that Shakespeare may have learned some version of the expression from a classical source, such as Sophocles, or more likely a Latin translation of his work.

== See also ==
- List of idioms in the English language
