= List of theatre festivals =

Theatre festivals are amongst the earliest types of festival. Classical Greek theatre was associated with religious festivals dedicated to Dionysus, called the City Dionysia. The medieval mystery plays were presented at the major Christian feasts. Theatre as an everyday part of life is a comparatively recent phenomenon.

In recent years, theatre festivals have been established to promote various types of theatre, such as the works of William Shakespeare and George Bernard Shaw. Many festivals, such as those in the fringe theatre movement, promote the work of beginning playwrights (called "new writing") and performers.

This is a list of theatre festivals around the world:

== Theatre festivals ==
| Name | Est. | City | Region | Country | Type |
|---|---|---|---|---|---|
| 24:7 Theatre Festival | 2004 | Manchester | England | United Kingdom | Annual (Around 24 July) |
| Adelaide Festival of Arts | 1960 | Adelaide | South Australia | Australia | |
| Aabaha Art and Theater Festival | 2023 | Greater Atlanta | Georgia | United States | Annual |
| All-Ireland Drama Festival | 1953 | Athlone | County Westmeath | Ireland | Annual amateur theatre competition (May) |
| Avignon Festival | 1947 | Avignon | | France | Annual (July) |
| Athens Festival | 1955 | Athens, Epidaurus | | Greece | Annual (May-October) |
| Belgrade International Theatre Festival | 1967 | Belgrade | | Serbia | Annual |
| Biennale Teatro | 1934 | Venice | | Italy | Annual (July-August) |
| Contemporary American Theater Festival | 1991 | Shepherdstown | West Virginia | United States | Annual (July) |
| Dublin Theatre Festival | 1957 | Dublin | | Ireland | Annual |
| Edinburgh International Festival | 1947 | Edinburgh | Scotland | United Kingdom | Annual (August) |
| Fajr International Theater Festival | 1983 | | | Iran | Annual |
| The International Kurdish Theater Festival | 1999 | Saqqez | Iran | Iran,Kurdistan | Annual |
| FEDU | 2015 | Sarajevo | | Bosnia and Herzegovina | Annual |
| FIDENA (name until 1972: "Meister des Puppenspiels") | 1958 | Bochum | North Rhine-Westphalia | Germany | Biennal |
| Harare International Festival of the Arts | 1999 | Harare | | Zimbabwe | |
| Guwahati Theatre Festival | 2016 | Guwahati | Assam | India | Annual |
| International Festival of Children's Theatres | 1994 | Subotica | Vojvodina | Serbia | International |
| International Theatre Festival of Kerala | 2008 | Thrissur | Kerala | India | Annual |
| International Thespian Festival | | Lincoln | Nebraska | United States | Annual |
| Intiman Theatre Festival | 1972 | Seattle | Washington | United States | Annual |
| Joakimfest | 2006 | City of Kragujevac | | Serbia | |
| Juventafest | 2013 | Sarajevo | | Bosnia and Herzegovina | |
| Last Frontier Theatre Conference | 1995 | Valdez | Alaska | United States | |
| Malta Festival Poznan | 1991 | Poznań | Greater Poland | Poland | Annual (June) |
| MasterWorks Festival | 1997 | Cedarville | Ohio | United States | Annual |
| MESS International Theatre Festival | 1960 | Sarajevo | | Bosnia and Herzegovina | Annual |
| National Arts Festival | 1974 | Grahamstown | Eastern Cape | South Africa | Annual |
| Natyanjali | 1981 | | South India | India | |
| Pacific Playwrights Festival | 1998 | Costa Mesa | California | United States | Annual three day festival |
| Salzburg Festival | 1920 | Salzburg | | Austria | Annual (Jul-Aug) |
| Shaw Festival | 1962 | Niagara-on-the-Lake | Ontario | Canada | Annual (April–September) |
| Short+Sweet | 2002 | Sydney (flagship) | Worldwide | Australia | Annual |
| Stratford Festival | 1953 | Stratford | Ontario | Canada | Annual |
| Sibiu International Theatre Festival | 1993 | Sibiu | Transylvania | Romania | Annual |
| Short Theatre Festival (part of Oradea International Theatre Festival) | 1976 | Oradea | Transylvania | Romania | Annual |
| Tbilisi International Festival of Theatre | 2009 | Tbilisi | | Georgia | Annual (September–October) |
| Toronto Fringe Festival | 1983 | Toronto | Ontario | Canada | Annual |
| United Solo Theatre Festival | 2010 | New York City | New York | United States | Annual (Fall) |
| Williamstown Theatre Festival | 1954 | Williamstown | Massachusetts | United States | Annual (Summer) |
| Zürcher Theater Spektakel | 1980 | Zürich | | Switzerland | Annual |
| Bilbao Festival of Theatre Schools (FETABI) | 2012 | Bilbao | Basque autonomous community | Spain | Annual |
| The Annual Theatre & Performing Arts Festival (Uganda) | 2019 | Uganda | | {{}} | Annual (October) |

|- |Tallinn Treff Visual Theatre Festival (Tallinn Treff)||2007||Tallinn||||Estonia||Biennial (May) |} SCENE Festival 2023 Cameroon
