= Noah Lukeman =

American writer (born 1973)

- Born: November 28, 1973 (age 52); New York City, New York, U.S.
- Education: Brandeis University
- Occupations: Literary agent, actor, writer (including playwright and screenwriter)
- Title: Founder of the Lukeman Literary Management
- Parent(s): Brenda Shoshanna, Gerald Lukeman
- Website: lukeman.com (Lukeman Literary Management)

Noah Lukeman (born November 28, 1973) is an American literary agent, actor, script-writer and author of works about writing and literature.

Lukeman has contributed to a number of newspapers and journals, including The Wall Street Journal and The New York Times. Some of his books have been translated into Portuguese, Japanese, Korean, Chinese and Indonesian. Lukeman is the founder of the Lukeman Literary Management.

== Early life and education ==
Lukeman was born in New York City, the son of Brenda Shoshanna, a psychologist, actress, and playwright, and Gerald Lukeman, a Shakespearean actor and director. He earned a Bachelor of Arts degree in English and creative writing at Brandeis University, located in Waltham, Massachusetts.

== Career ==
After college, Lukeman worked for various publishers, including William Morrow and Farrar, Straus and Giroux.

In 1996, Lukeman founded Lukeman Literary Management, in which capacity he acted as agent for a number of successful writers. In 2001, Lukeman joined Michael Ovitz's Artists Management Group (AMG), where he ran its New York publishing office for years before returning to being an independent agent.

Lukeman has also acted in a few independent films.

=== Writing ===
Lukeman's writing is diverse in nature. His first published works offered advice and techniques for writers. Since then, he has collaborated with a U.S. Marine Corps general to write about the inner workings of CENTCOM (U.S. Central Command) and the wars in Iraq and Afghanistan, and has written a sequel to Shakespeare's Macbeth in blank verse. Lukeman also works as a screenwriter, and his screenplay, Brothers in Arms, was sold and named to The Black List, an annual survey of the "most-liked" motion picture screenplays not yet produced.

== Bibliography ==
=== Non-fiction ===
- (1999) The First Five Pages: A Writer’s Guide to Staying Out of the Rejection Pile, Simon & Schuster ISBN 978-0-684-85743-5
- (2002) The Plot Thickens: 8 Ways to Bring Fiction to Life, St. Martin's Press, ISBN 978-0-312-30928-2
- (2006) A Dash of Style: The Art and Mastery of Punctuation, W.W. Norton (U.S.) ISBN 978-0-393-32980-3, Oxford University Press (U.K.)

==== Collaborations ====
with Michael DeLong:

- (2004) Inside CentCom: The Unvarnished Truth about the Wars in Afghanistan and Iraq, Regenery Publishing ISBN 978-0-89526-020-8
- (2007) A General Speaks Out: The Truth About the Wars in Afghanistan and Iraq, Zenith Publishing, ISBN 978-0-7603-3048-7

=== Screenplay ===
- Brothers in Arms

=== Play ===
- (2008) The Tragedy of Macbeth Part II: The Seed of Banquo, Pegasus, ISBN 978-1-60598-011-9
