= Macbeth (1979 film) =

1979 British TV film by Philip Casson

- Written by: William Shakespeare (original play); Trevor Nunn (adaptation for television)
- Directed by: Philip Casson
- Starring: Ian McKellen; Judi Dench; Bob Peck; John Woodvine; Roger Rees; Griffith Jones; Ian McDiarmid; Marie Kean
- Country of origin: United Kingdom
- Original language: English

Production
- Executive producer: Verity Lambert
- Producer: Trevor Nunn
- Running time: 145 min
- Production company: Thames Television

Original release
- Network: ITV
- Release: 1979

Macbeth is a 1979 videotaped version of Trevor Nunn's Royal Shakespeare Company production of the play by William Shakespeare. Produced by Thames Television, it features Ian McKellen as Macbeth and Judi Dench as Lady Macbeth. The TV version was directed by Philip Casson.

== Description and background ==
The original stage production was performed at The Other Place, the RSC's small studio theatre in Stratford-upon-Avon. It had been performed in the round before small audiences, with a bare stage and simple costuming. The recording preserves this style: the actors perform on a circular set and with a mostly black background; changes of setting are indicated only by lighting changes.

During the scene of the ghost, Macbeth "ha[s] a seizure" in this version of the play.

== Reception ==
"Ian McKellen's tortured Macbeth and Judi Dench's commanding, intelligent Lady Macbeth were powerful as individual performances, and the relationship between them was urgent and intense", noted Alexander Leggatt. The staging is described as "stark and empty".

== Cast ==
- Ian McKellen as Macbeth
- Judi Dench as Lady Macbeth
- John Bown as Lennox
- Susan Dury as 3rd Witch / Lady Macduff
- Judith Harte as 2nd Witch / Gentlewoman
- Greg Hicks as Donalbain / Seyton
- David Howey as Sergeant / 1st Murderer / Doctor
- Griffith Jones as Duncan
- Marie Kean as 1st Witch
- Ian McDiarmid as The Porter / Ross
- Bob Peck as Macduff
- Duncan Preston as Angus
- Roger Rees as Malcolm
- Zak Taylor as Fleance / Messenger
- Stephen Warner as Young Macduff
- John Woodvine as Banquo
