= John Bown =

British actor, film director, screenwriter (1934–2017)

- Born: 1 July 1934; Corfe Mullen, Dorset, England, UK
- Died: 5 November 2017 (aged 83); London, England, UK
- Occupation: Actor
- Years active: 1955–2006
- Spouse: Sibylla Kay (m. 1960)

John Bown (1 July 1934 – 5 November 2017) was a British actor, film director, and screenwriter. He is best known for his role as Commander Neil Stafford in the final season of the television series Doomwatch.

== Life and career ==
John Bown was born on 1 July 1934 in Corfe Mullen, Dorset and educated at Queen Elizabeth Grammar School in Wimborne Minster. He trained at the London Academy of Music and Dramatic Art (LAMDA) and some time after went into repertory in Salisbury and Birmingham. He played Jack Hunter in the British premiere of The Rose Tattoo, performed by the New Shakespeare Theatre Company under the direction of Sam Wanamaker in November 1958, and continued in the role when the company transferred the production to the New Theatre, London in 1959. His performance was described as "impressive" by one critic, with another saying "the love-scene between Miss Feller and Mr Bown, for all its wild abandon on her part and desperate abstentions on his, has a rare and tender radiance." Earlier the same year, he had appeared as Brick in Cat on a Hot Tin Roof with the same company. A critic wrote "One will not quickly forget ... that interminable second act showdown between the life-loving father (Leo McKern) and the wife-hating son (John Bown), each condemned to suffer in the way that hurts most." In 1960, his performance as Richard Rich in the premiere of A Man for All Seasons was described by a critic in The Stage as "notable".

In the 1960s, he directed and wrote the screenplay for the short (11-minute) film North West Confidential and the feature film Monique, which starred his wife Sibylla Kay in the title role; they had married in 1960. Afterwards, Bown was planning his next project titled Hey, You! but could not find the backing for it. He resumed acting.

From 1974 to 1975 he played Colonel Maurel in the play Grand Manoeuvres by A. E. Ellis at The Old Vic, London. Also in 1975, he appeared with the Oxford Playhouse Company in The Caretaker and Death of a Salesman, of which a critic wrote that Bown and Richard Durden "give passionate accounts of the sons. The blood pressure never drops." From 1976 to 1979 he was a member of the Royal Shakespeare Company, appearing in 16 productions in seven major theatres. Among them was the play Half an hour please! which he wrote and acted in, with the production designed by Judi Dench. One reviewer described it as "a jewel of a piece [that] would lend itself superbly to television."

On television, he appeared in Dr. Who and the Daleks as Antodus (1965), in Doomwatch as Commander Neil Stafford (1972), and as the lead character Detective Inspector Tom Masefield in Margot Bennett's 1965 series The Big Spender. He also appeared in such television series as The Four Just Men, No Hiding Place, The Baron, The Champions and Blake's 7.

Bown had two children with his wife Sibylla. He died in Hampstead in 2017.

=== Selected stage performances ===
Year	Title	Author	Theatre	Role	Company
1955	Both Ends Meet	Arthur Macrae	Spa Theatre, Whitby		
1956	The Spring Pattern	Margaret Luce	Playhouse, Salisbury		
1956	The School for Wives	Molière	Alexandra Theatre, Birmingham	Horace	Alexandra Repertory Company
1957	The Touch of Fear	Dorothy and Campbell Christie	Alexandra Theatre, Birmingham	Michael Stanham	Alexandra Repertory Company
1957	Plaintiff in a Pretty Hat	Hugh Williams and Margaret Williams	Alexandra Theatre, Birmingham	Lord Plynlimmon	Alexandra Repertory Company
1958	Cat on a Hot Tin Roof	Tennessee Williams	New Shakespeare Theatre, Liverpool	Brick	New Shakespeare Theatre Company
1958	The Deserters	Norman Thaddeus Vane	Royal Court Theatre, Liverpool	Eddy	
1958	Bus Stop	William Inge	New Shakespeare Theatre, Liverpool	Beauregard "Bo" Decker	New Shakespeare Theatre Company
1958	The Rose Tattoo	Tennessee Williams	New Shakespeare Theatre, Liverpool	Jack Hunter	New Shakespeare Theatre Company; British premiere
1959	The Rose Tattoo	Tennessee Williams	New Theatre, London	Jack Hunter	Donmar Productions Ltd, Gilda Dahlberg and Sam Wanamaker Productions Ltd, and New Shakespeare Theatre Club
1960	A Man for All Seasons	Robert Bolt	Gielgud Theatre, London	Richard Rich	Premiere
1961	The Bird of Time	Peter Mayne	Savoy Theatre, London	Captain Alan Craig	Allan Davis Company
1962	In the Jungle of Cities	Bertolt Brecht	Theatre Royal Stratford East	George Garga	
1966	The Birdwatcher	Georges Feydeau, translated and adapted by Richard Cottrell	Hampstead Theatre Club	Duchotel	Hampstead Theatre Club
1966	The Clandestine Marriage	Colman and Garrick	Chichester Festival Theatre	Lovewell	
1973	A Winter's Tale	Shakespeare	Ludlow Festival	Leontes	
1974	The Front Page	Ben Hecht and Charles MacArthur	Her Majesty's Theatre, Sydney; Comedy Theatre, Melbourne; Her Majesty's Theatre, Adelaide		Royal National Theatre
1975	Death of a Salesman	Arthur Miller	Greenwood Theatre, King's College London; Arts Theatre, London	Biff Loman	Oxford Playhouse Company
1975	The Caretaker	Harold Pinter	Warwick Arts Centre	Aston	Oxford Playhouse Company
1976	Macbeth	Shakespeare	The Other Place, Stratford-upon-Avon	Lennox	Royal Shakespeare Company
1977	Half an Hour, Please	John Bown	Gulbenkian Studio, Newcastle upon Tyne	Dresser	Royal Shakespeare Company (Bown wrote and performed in this play as part of the Newcastle 'Fringe')
1977	Macbeth	Shakespeare	Royal Shakespeare Theatre, Stratford-upon-Avon	Lennox	Royal Shakespeare Company
1977	The Alchemist	Ben Jonson	The Other Place, Stratford-upon-Avon		Royal Shakespeare Company
1977	Macbeth	Shakespeare	RSC Warehouse, London; Young Vic, London	Lennox	Royal Shakespeare Company
1979	Every Good Boy Deserves Favour	Tom Stoppard	Oxford Playhouse	Alexander	Oxford Music Theatre
1987	This Savage Parade	Anthony Shaffer	King's Head Theatre, London	Ophir	

== Filmography ==
=== Actor ===
- Asmodée (1959) as Harry Fanning
- Tunes of Glory (1960) as One of the Other Officers
- Out of the Fog (1962) as Herb Bailey
- Master Spy (1963) as John Baxter
- Dr. Who and the Daleks (1965) as Antodus
- The Big Spender by Margot Bennett (1965) as Detective Inspector Tom Masefield
- Quatermass and the Pit (1967) as TV Interviewer (uncredited)
- The Devil Rides Out (1968) as Receptionist (uncredited)
- Doomwatch (1972) as Commander Neil Stafford
- Vampire Circus (1972) as Schilt
- Fear in the Night (1972) as 1st Policeman
- Macbeth (1979) as Lennox
- Dark Corners (2006) as Old Man

=== Director and screenwriter ===
- North West Confidential (1969)
- Monique (1970)
