= Out of the Fog =

Out of the Fog may refer to:

- Out of the Fog (1919 film), lost film starring Alla Nazimova
- Out of the Fog (1941 film), film noir featuring John Garfield and Ida Lupino based on Irwin Shaw's 1939 play The Gentle People
- Out of the Fog (1962 film), a British film about an ex-con accused of a series of murders (called Fog for a Killer in the USA)
- Out of the Fog, a talk show on Rogers TV in Newfoundland and Labrador, Canada
