= Monique (film) =

- Theatrical release poster
- Directed by: John Bown
- Written by: John Bown
- Produced by: Michael Style; Executive; Tony Tenser
- Starring: Joan Alcorn; Sibylla Kay; David Sumner; Carol Hawkins
- Cinematography: Moray Grant
- Edited by: Richard Sidwell
- Music by: Jacques Loussier
- Production company: Tigon
- Distributed by: Tigon
- Release date: 1970
- Running time: 88 minutes
- Country: United Kingdom
- Language: English
- Budget: £51,000

Monique is a 1970 British drama film directed and written by John Bown and starring Joan Alcorn, Sibylla Kay and David Sumner.

== Plot ==
Monique is a young French au pair who goes to work for unhappily-married couple Jean and Bill. She gets to know husband and wife intimately. Bill soon notices his wife has become more awakened sexually. After Bill sleeps with Monique, he comes home one day to discover the two women in bed together. When Monique returns to France, Bill and Jean discover their marriage has become happier.

== Cast ==
- Joan Alcorn as Jean
- Sibylla Kay as Monique
- David Sumner as Bill
- Nicola Bown as Susan
- Jacob Fitz-Jones as Edward
- Davilia O'Connor as Harriet
- Carol Hawkins as blonde girl (credited as Carolanne Hawkins)
- Howard Rawlinson as Richard

== Critical reception ==
Monthly Film Bulletin said "Despite its unusually naturalistic, almost prosaic approach, Monique remains an unconvincing sexual fairy tale, lacking in any clear moral perspective. Its chief weakness lies in the overly ambivalent title character – a mixture of shallowminded teenager and worldly-wise sophisticate – and the fault lies as much in the script as in Sibylla Kay's performance as the sexual faith-healer."
