= David Sumner (actor) =

English actor (born 1933)

- Born: 1933 (age 92–93); Mitcham, Surrey, England
- Education: RADA
- Occupation: Actor

David Sumner (born 1933) is an English actor. He is probably best known for appearing in Out of the Fog as George Mallon.

== Early life and career ==
Sumner educated at Sutton Grammar School and trained at the RADA, graduating in 1957.

He appeared in the television series such as The Sullavan Brothers (1964-65), Department S (1968) and Beau Geste (1982).

== Partial filmography ==
Year	Title	Role
1962	Out of the Fog	George Mallon
1962	The Wild and the Willing	John Agincourt
1963	Follow the Boys	Vittorio
1965	The Wild Affair	Ralph
1967	The Long Duel	Gyan Singh
1968	Submarine X-1	Lt. Davis R.N.V.R.
1970	Monique	Bill
