= Out of the Fog (1962 film) =

1962 British film by Montgomery Tully

- Opening titles
- Directed by: Montgomery Tully
- Screenplay by: Montgomery Tully
- Produced by: Maurice J. Wilson
- Starring: David Sumner; Susan Travers; John Arnatt; James Hayter; Jack Watson
- Cinematography: Walter J. Harvey
- Edited by: Oswald Hafenrichter
- Music by: Philip Martell
- Production company: Eternal Films
- Release date: 15 October 1962
- Running time: 68 minutes
- Country: United Kingdom
- Language: English

Out of the Fog (U.S. title: Fog for a Killer) is a 1962 British film directed and written by Montgomery Tully and starring David Sumner, Susan Travers and John Arnatt. It was produced by Maurice J. Wilson for Eternal Films, and based on a novel by Bruce Graeme.

== Plot ==
On his release from prison, George Mallon moves into a hostel for ex-convicts run by Mr. Daniels. When a series of murders of blonde women takes place on the local common, the police suspect Mallon, despite having no hard evidence. Blonde policewoman June Lock is assigned to befriend Mallon as bait for him to attack her.

== Cast ==
- David Sumner as George Mallon
- Susan Travers as Sgt. June Lock
- John Arnatt as Supt. Chadwick
- James Hayter as Mr. Daniels
- Jack Watson as Sgt. Tracey
- Olga Lindo as Mrs. Mallon
- Renée Houston as Ma
- George Woodbridge as Chopper
- Michael Ripper as Tich
- Michael Wynne as Ted
- Richard Shaw as Harry
- John Woodnutt as Blacky
- John Bown as Herb
- John Welsh as governor
- Anthony Oliver as chaplain
- Tony Quinn as manager

== Reception ==
The Monthly Film Bulletin wrote: "A routine production, a story which relies a little too much on coincidence, and a host of insignificant characters who are used only for padding. Nevertheless this is a neat enough affair, on the whole creditably acted, and with a good pay-off which (less usual these days) tends to make the police look like fools. Most of the work falls on David Sumner, but the outstanding performance is John Arnatt's as the Superintendent."
