= Donalbain (Macbeth) =

Theatrical character in the play "Macbeth"

- Macbeth character
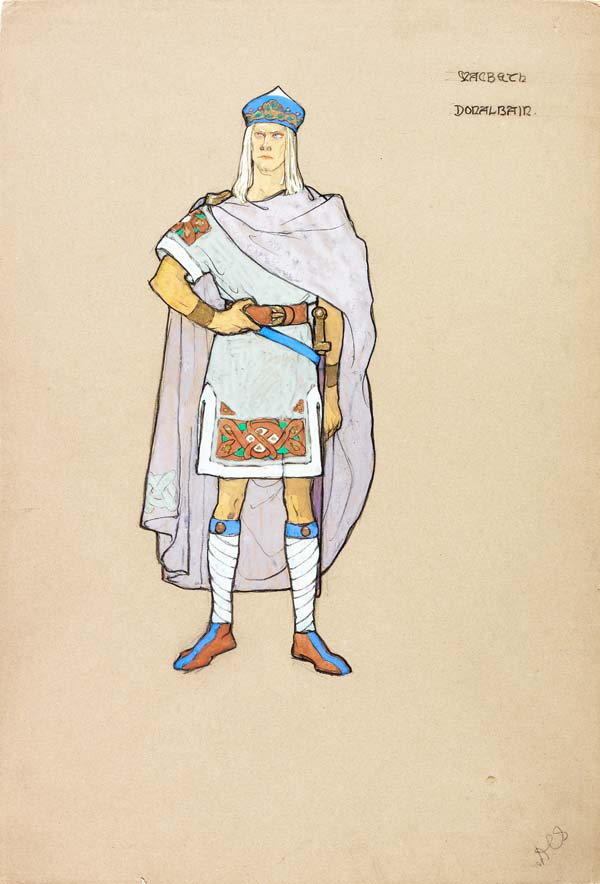
- Illustration of Donalbain, Dorothy Carleton Smyth (c. 1900)
- Created by: William Shakespeare
- Based on: Donald III of Scotland

In-universe information
- Affiliation: Loyal to King Duncan and Malcolm
- Family: King Duncan (father); King Malcolm (elder brother); Macbeth (first cousin once removed)

Donalbain is a fictional character in William Shakespeare's Macbeth (c. 1603–1607). He is the younger son of King Duncan and brother to Malcolm, the heir to the throne. Donalbain flees to Ireland after the murder of his father for refuge. He is ultimately based on the historical King Donald III of Scotland.

In the original text of the First Folio his name is spelled Donalbaine, and is sometimes also spelled Donaldbain. His name is derived from the Scottish Gaelic Dòmhnall Bàn, "Donald the Fair."

== Origin ==
Donalbain is based on 'Donald Bane' from Holinshed's Chronicles (1587). He only appears after King Duncan is murdered. Holinshed's historical personage is Donald III of Scotland.

Historically, Donalbain (Donald Ban/Donald the Fair) seized the Scottish throne after the death of Malcolm and reigned intermittently a few years but was ultimately succeeded by Malcolm's son Edgar.

== Role in the play ==
Donalbain appears in a few early scenes in the entire play, speaking only when his brother decides to seek refuge in England, while he seeks refuge in Ireland. Donalbain tells Malcolm that their "separated fortune / Shall keep us both the safer".

Although it is easy to argue that Donalbain does not contribute to the play, granted his lack of appearance, he plays his role by supporting Malcolm as his brother and Duncan as his father. He is also a boost to the King's character, as neither of his sons are involved in foul play in the play.

The ending of Roman Polanski's film adaptation of Macbeth, in which Donalbain, returning to Scotland after the death of Macbeth, hears the witches murmuring in the heather and gets off his horse to investigate, alludes to the historical fact that Donald III seized the throne after the death of Malcolm.
