= Malcolm (Macbeth) =

Character in Shakespeare's play

- Macbeth character
- Created by: William Shakespeare
- Based on: Malcolm III of Scotland

In-universe information
- Family: King Duncan (father); Donalbain (younger brother); Macbeth (first cousin once removed)

Malcolm is a fictional character in William Shakespeare's Macbeth (c. 1603–1607). The character is based on the historical king Malcolm III of Scotland, and is derived largely from the account in Holinshed's Chronicles (1587), a history of Britain. He is the elder son of King Duncan, the heir to the throne, and older brother to Donalbain. In the end, he regains the throne after mustering support to overthrow Macbeth.

== Role in the play ==
Malcolm, like his father (King Duncan), represents order. He first appears in Act I, scene 2 (1.2), where he is talking to a sergeant, with Duncan about Macbeth's exploits on the field of battle. Malcolm later appears in Act 1.4 talking about the execution of the former Thane of Cawdor with Duncan. Macbeth then enters and receives congratulations for his victory. In Act 1.4, Duncan declares Malcolm to be his heir ("We will establish our estate upon / Our eldest, Malcolm, whom we name hereafter The Prince of Cumberland" – Duncan, Act 1.4 37–39). This act frustrates Macbeth.

Malcolm is a guest at Macbeth's castle when Macbeth kills Malcolm's father, Duncan, in Act 2.2. Malcolm and his brother are informed of the death in Act 2.3. Because they are suspected of the murder, Malcolm is not immediately declared the king. Under suspicion and implicit threat, he and his brother decide to flee Scotland after the murder. While Donalbain flees to Ireland, Malcolm flees to England ("To show an unfelt sorrow is an office / Which the false man does easy. I'll to England." – Malcolm Act 2.3 138–39; "To Ireland I; our separated fortune / Shall keep us both safer. Where we are / There's daggers in men's smiles;" – Donalbain, Act 2.3 140–2). Their flight heightens their suspicion ("Malcolm and Donalbain, the king's two sons, / Are stol'n away and fled, which puts upon them Suspicion of the deed." – Macduff, Act 2.4 25–27), while Macbeth assumes their father's throne.

In Act 4.1, Macbeth sees three apparitions summoned by the Three Witches, with Malcolm's Act 5.4 approach to the Dunsinane Castle with tree branches being the final one. Act 4.3 presents irony with Macduff needing to prove his loyalty and Malcolm needing to prove his worthiness. In Act 4.3, Malcolm talks to Macduff about his loyalties and what to do. Upon hearing Macduff cast aspersions upon Macbeth ("Not in the legions of horrid hell can come a devil more damned in evils to top Macbeth." – Macduff, Act 4.3 55–57), Malcolm feigns his own vices to further test Macduff. Macduff responds that he too would have such vices if he were king and then signals his loyalty to Scotland ("O Scotland, Scotland!" – Macduff, Act 4.3 100). They concur that maybe no one is fit to rule such a fine land. This leads Malcolm to trust Macduff ("Macduff, this noble passion, / Child of integrity, hath from my soul / Wiped the black scruples, reconciled my thoughts / To thy good truth and honor." – Malcolm, Act 4.3 114– 17). Upon news that Macduff's family was slain, Malcolm urges Macduff to take arms with him against Macbeth ("Be this the whetstone of your sword. Let grief / Convert to anger; blunt not the heart, enrage it." – Malcolm, Act 4.3 228–229). Macduff agrees it is time to seek vengeance ("Bring thou this fiend of Scotland and myself; / Within my sword's length set him. If he 'scape, / Heaven forgive him too!" – Macduff, Act 4.3 233–35) as the scene ends. In the scene Malcolm learns that manhood is more than aggression when Macduff tells him that he must also grieve for his loss ("Dispute it like a man." – Malcolm, Act 4.3 220; "I shall do so, / But I must also feel it as a man." – Macduff, Act 4.3 220–21).

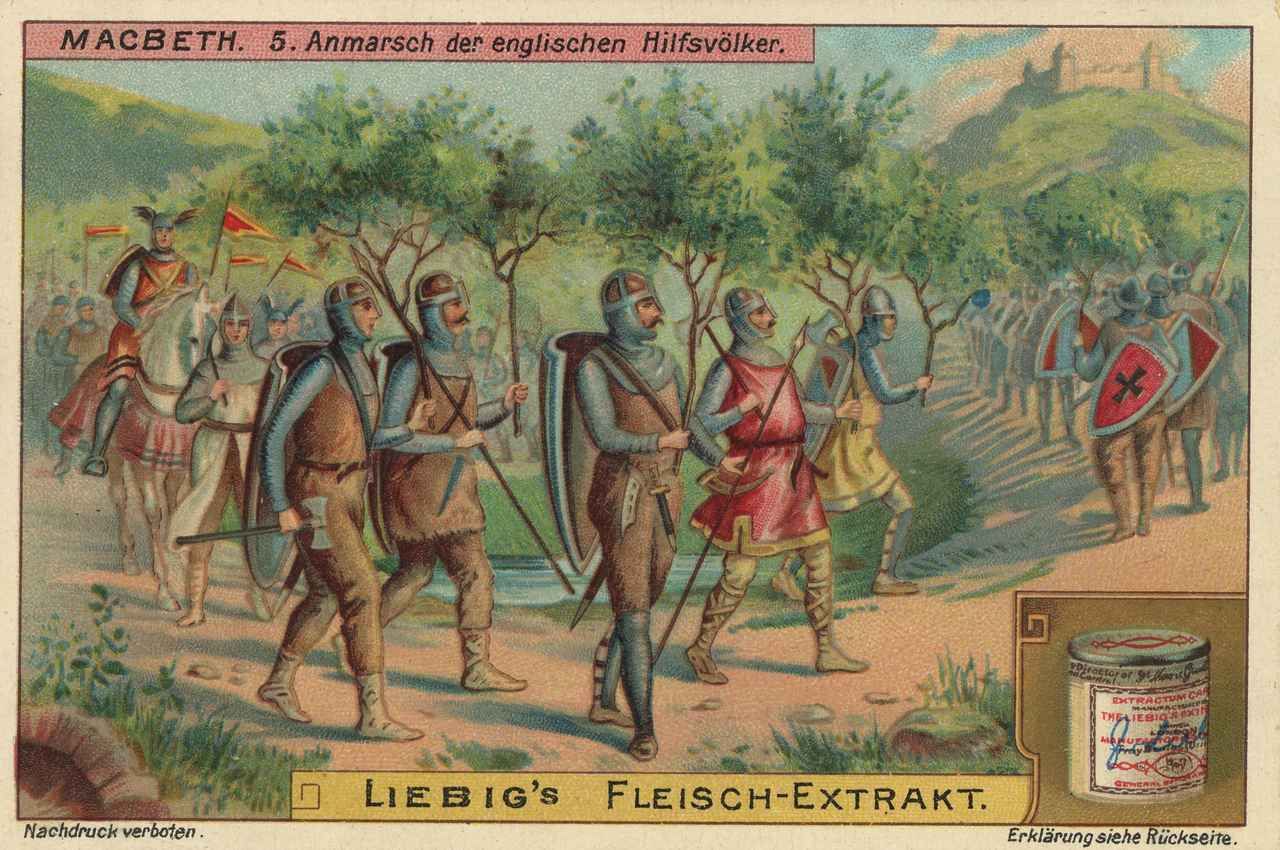
Malcolm leads his army on Dunsinane Castle, from a 1912 illustration

Malcolm raises an army in England, and marches on Scotland with Macduff to reclaim his birthright from Macbeth. The Scottish noblemen lend their support to restore order to the land after observing Macbeth's extreme behaviour. In Act 5.4, Malcolm confers with Englishman Siward (the Elder) and his officers about strategies for obscuring their forces ("Let very soldier hew him down a bough / And bear't before him. Thereby shall we shadow / The numbers of our host, and make discovery / Err in report of us." – Malcolm, 5.4 4–7) and about Macbeth's defence plans ("We learn no other but the confident tyrant / Keeps still in Dunsinane, and will endure / Our setting down before't." – Siward, 5.4 8–10). In Act 5.6, the battle commences as Malcolm, Macduff and Siward command forces against Dunsinane Castle. In Act 5.8 Malcolm and Siward storm Macbeth's castle. Siward receives news that his son was slain. Malcolm consoles him with an opportunity to grieve. Macduff enters with Macbeth's head and declares Malcolm the King ("Hail, King! for so thou art: behold, where stands / Th' usurpers cursed head." – Macduff, 5.8 54–55). Malcolm takes over as king and notes that order has been restored and that his intentions are good ("by the grace of Grace / We will perform in measure, time, and place:" – Malcolm, Act 5.8 72–73). He invites everyone to his coronation.

== Critical comments ==
Sylvan Barnet described Malcolm as "chaste, trustworthy, and patriotic". As the natural heir to the throne, Malcolm is Macbeth's foremost rival. He and his allies are "God's soldiers" and their eventual victory marks a restoration of moral order according to Barnet.

After deposing Macbeth and resuming his rightful place, Malcolm delivers the final words of the play as a speech contrasting himself and the former tyrant. During his final speech, he grants earldoms to Macduff and others, while reclaiming his birthright. The ending of Macbeth is viewed by some reviewers as failing to meet expectations, theorized to be due to it being anti-climactic because Macbeth is killed by Macduff, rather than Malcolm or Fleance, who are perceived to have greater reasons to seek vengeance.
