= Macbeth =

Play by William Shakespeare

The Tragedie of Macbeth
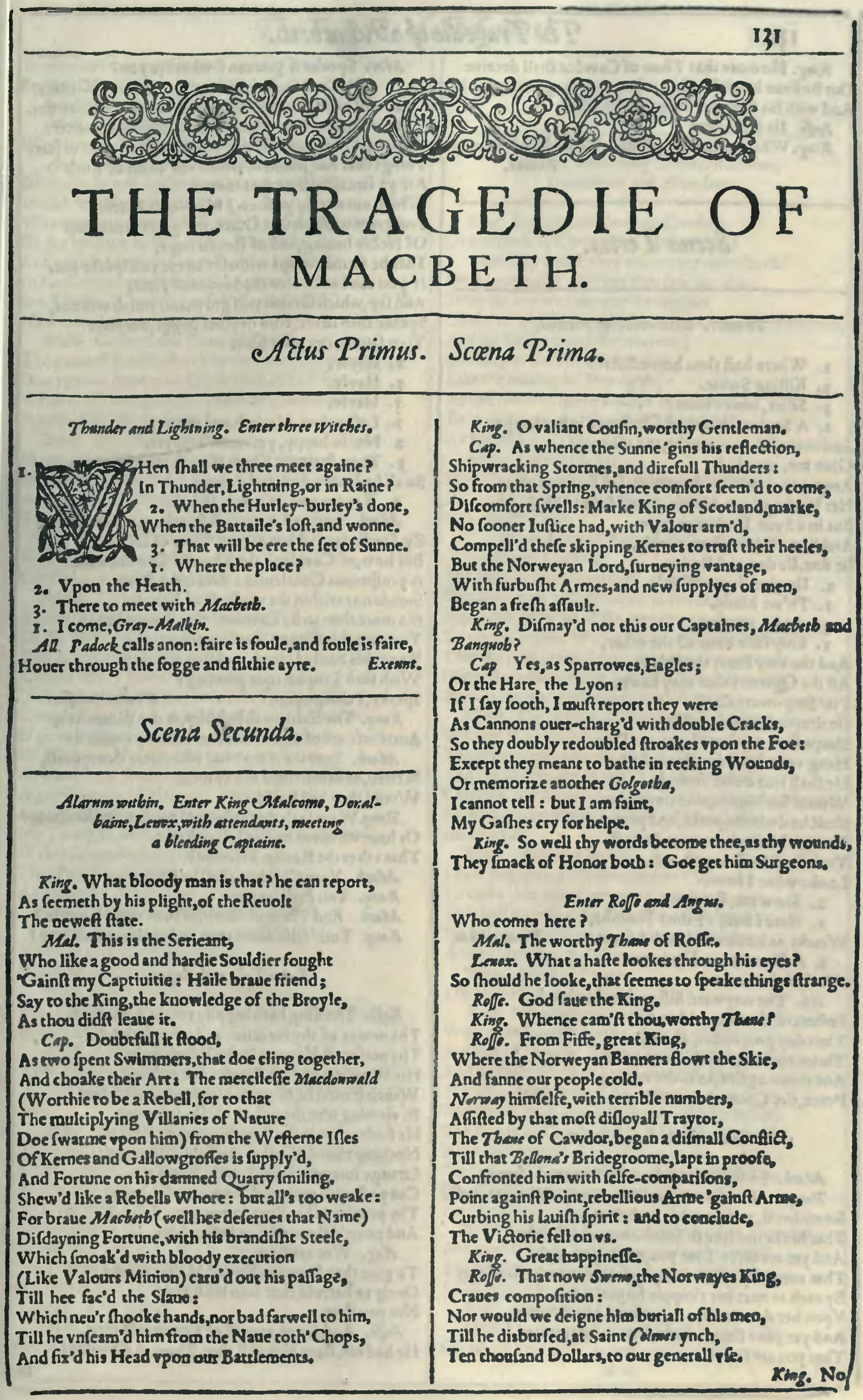
- Title page of the part in the First Folio
- Author: William Shakespeare
- Language: English
- Genre: Shakespearean tragedy, psychological horror
- Set in: Scotland and England (Act IV, Scene III)
- Publisher: Edward Blount and William Jaggard
- Publication date: 1623
- Publication place: London, England
- Text: The Tragedie of Macbeth at Wikisource

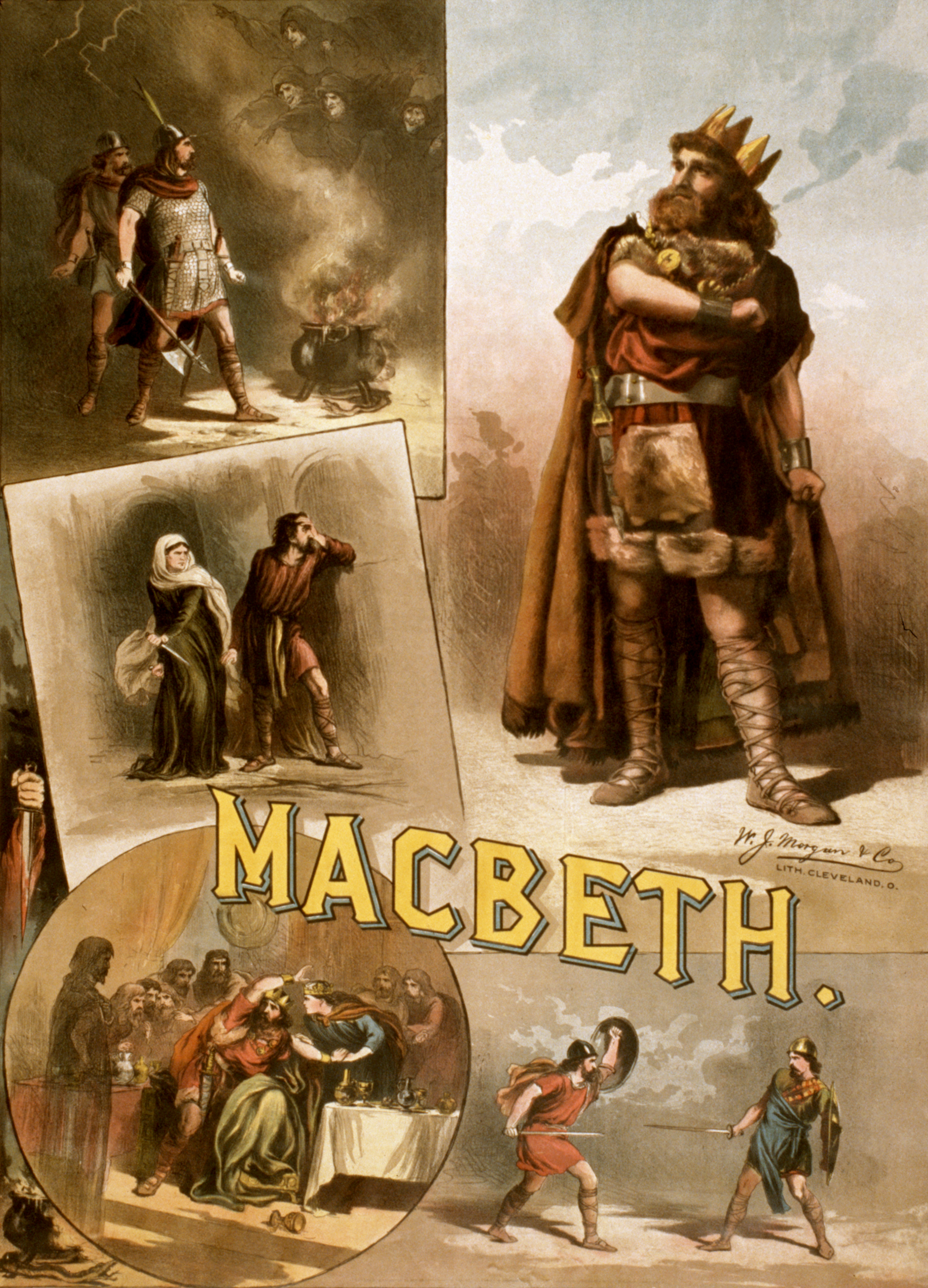
A poster for a c. 1884 American production of Macbeth, starring Thomas W. Keene. Depicted, counter-clockwise from top-left, are: Macbeth and Banquo meeting the witches, the aftermath of the murder of Duncan, Banquo's ghost, Macbeth dueling Macduff, and Macbeth.

The Tragedy of Macbeth, often shortened to Macbeth (/mək.ˈbɛθ/), is a tragedy by William Shakespeare which is estimated to have been first performed in 1606. (Note: For the first performance in 1607, see Gurr 2009, p. 293, Thomson 1992, p. 64, and Wickham 1969, p. 231. For the date of composition, see Brooke 2008, p. 1 and Clark & Mason 2015, p. 13) It dramatises the physically violent and damaging psychological effects of political ambitions and power. It was first published in the Folio of 1623, possibly from a prompt book, and is Shakespeare's shortest tragedy. Scholars believe Macbeth, of all the plays that Shakespeare wrote during the reign of King James I, contains the most allusions to James, patron of Shakespeare's acting company.

In the play, a brave Scottish general named Macbeth receives a prophecy from a trio of witches that one day he will become King of Scotland. Consumed by his latent ambition and spurred to violence by his wife, Macbeth murders King Duncan and takes the Scottish throne for himself. Then, racked with guilt and paranoia, he commits further murders to protect himself from enmity and suspicion, becoming a tyrannical ruler in the process. The violence perpetrated by the power-hungry couple leads to their insanity and finally to their deaths.

Shakespeare's source for the story is the account of Macbeth, King of Scotland, Macduff, and Duncan in Holinshed's Chronicles (1587), a history of England, Scotland, and Ireland familiar to Shakespeare and his contemporaries, although the events in the play differ extensively from the history of the real Macbeth.

There was a stage superstition that the name of the play should not be spoken, and that it should instead be called "The Scottish Play". The play has attracted some of the most renowned actors to the roles of Macbeth and Lady Macbeth and has been adapted to film, television, opera, novels, comics, and other media.

== Plot ==
=== Act I ===
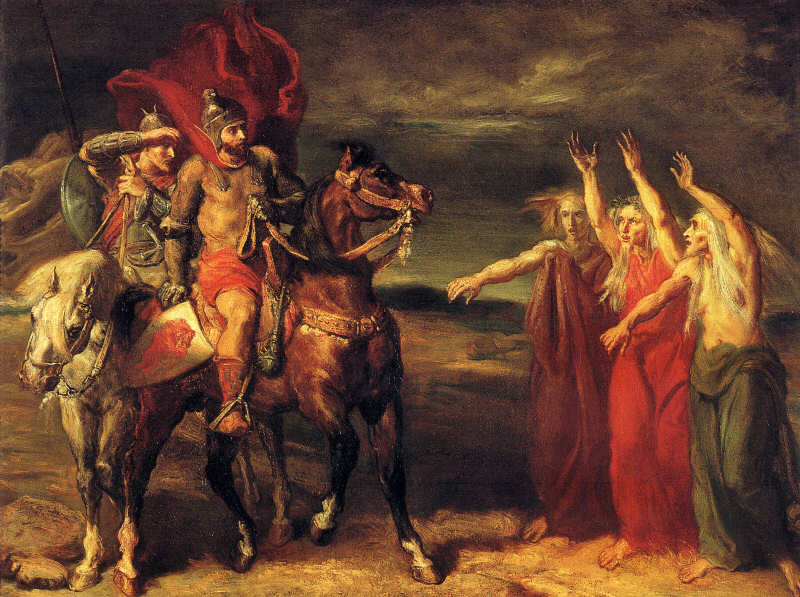
Macbeth and Banquo encounter the witches for the first time.

Amid thunder and lightning, three witches decide that their next meeting will be with Macbeth, the Thane (Lord) of Glamis. In the following scene, soldiers report to King Duncan of Scotland that his generals Banquo and Macbeth have just defeated a rebellion led by the traitorous Thane of Cawdor, allied with forces from Norway and Ireland. Duncan praises his kinsmen for their bravery and fighting prowess, announcing that the title of Thane of Cawdor shall be transferred to Macbeth.

Wandering on a heath, Macbeth and Banquo are puzzled when the three witches appear, prophetically hailing Macbeth as "Thane of Glamis" and "Thane of Cawdor", next saying he shall "be king hereafter". When Banquo asks of his own fortunes, the witches respond that he will father a line of kings, though he himself will not be one. The witches vanish, and the Thane of Ross arrives, informing Macbeth of his newly bestowed title: Thane of Cawdor. The witches' first prophecy is thus fulfilled, and Macbeth immediately begins to harbour nervous ambitions of becoming king. King Duncan himself soon welcomes and praises Macbeth and Banquo, declaring they will all spend the night at Macbeth's castle in Inverness; also, Duncan's son Malcolm is announced as his official heir. Macbeth sends a letter about the witches ahead to his wife, Lady Macbeth, who is resolute that she and her husband should murder Duncan in order to obtain the crown. When Macbeth arrives in Inverness, she persuades him to kill the king that very night. They plan to get Duncan's two chamber attendants drunk so that they will black out; thus, the next morning they can frame the attendants for the murder.

=== Act II ===
That night, despite his doubts and a number of supernatural omens, including a hallucination of a blood-smeared dagger, (Note: This scene is open to various interpretations from readers and has been interpreted differently in adaptations.) Macbeth goes offstage and stabs the sleeping Duncan to death. Returning, he is so shaken that Lady Macbeth finds him still holding the bloody daggers, which she scolds him for, reminding him they must be left on Duncan's sleeping servants. She takes the knives and places them back in Duncan's chamber. When the couple hears knocking at the castle gate, they hurry to bed.

A drunken porter opens the gate, admitting Macduff (the Thane of Fife) and a nobleman named Lennox: they wish to visit the king. Macbeth, greeting them, leads them to Duncan's chamber. Macduff enters the chamber then returns to the stage, announcing with shock the murder of Duncan. Macbeth and Lennox rush into the chamber where, offstage, Macbeth impulsively kills Duncan's servants to prevent them from professing their innocence. He reappears and confesses to the other nobles that he has killed the servants, but lies that his intentions were to avenge the king's murder. Duncan's two sons, Malcolm and Donalbain, flee the country, fearing that they will be killed next. Macduff explains that their flight makes them the main suspects in the king's death, and Macbeth, as Duncan's next of kin, assumes the throne offstage as the new King of Scotland. Banquo remembers the witches' prophecy about how his own descendants would inherit the throne, and he is suspicious that Macbeth might be Duncan's true killer.

=== Act III ===
Despite Macbeth's success, he remains uneasy about Banquo's role in the prophecy. Inviting Banquo to a royal banquet, Macbeth discovers that Banquo and his young son Fleance will be riding out that night. Macbeth rapidly arranges to have Banquo and Fleance killed, hiring two men and later adding a third murderer to the plan. During the ambush, the murderers succeed in killing Banquo, but Fleance escapes. Macbeth is furious that an heir of Banquo remains alive.

At the banquet, Macbeth has invited his lords and Lady Macbeth to a night of drinking and merriment, though Macduff has refused to come. Banquo's ghost enters and sits in Macbeth's place. Macbeth raves fearfully, startling his guests, as the ghost is visible only to him. The others panic at the sight of Macbeth raging at an empty chair, until a desperate Lady Macbeth lies that her husband is merely afflicted with a harmless lifelong illness. The ghost departs and returns once more, causing the same riotous anger and fear in Macbeth. This time, Lady Macbeth demands that the visitors leave. Elsewhere, Hecate, queen of witchcraft, scolds the three witches for communicating with Macbeth without consulting her. Hecate instructs the witches to next give Macbeth a false sense of safety and overconfidence about his new position. (Note: Some scholars believe that the Hecate scene was not part of the original Macbeth script.) Through verbal irony, Lennox reveals to another lord his suspicions that Macbeth is a murdering tyrant and they discuss how Macduff, refusing to attend Macbeth's banquet, has gone to England to find allies who will help take back the Scottish throne.

=== Act IV ===
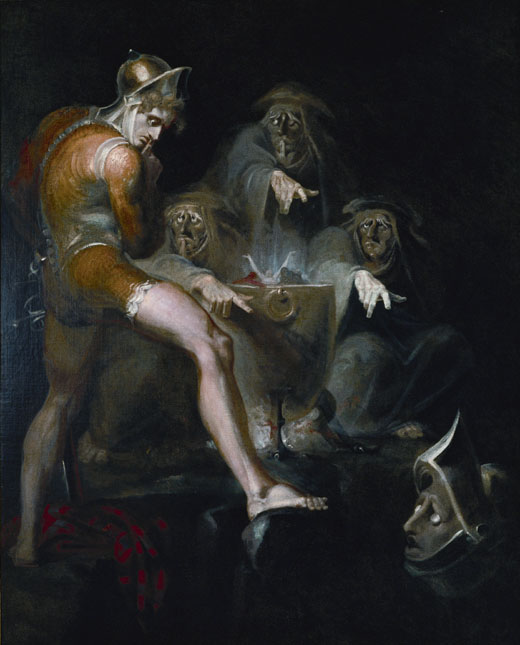
Macbeth consulting the Vision of the Armed Head by Johann Heinrich Füssli

Macbeth visits the three witches and asks them to reveal the truth of their prophecies to him. They summon horrible apparitions, each of which offers further supernatural pronouncements. First, they conjure an armoured head, which tells him to beware of Macduff (IV.i.72). Second, a bloody child tells him that no one born of a woman will be able to harm him. Thirdly, a crowned child holding a tree states that Macbeth will be safe until Great Birnam Wood comes to Dunsinane Hill. Macbeth is relieved because he knows that all his enemies are born of women and a forest cannot possibly travel across the land. However, the witches also conjure a procession of eight crowned kings, the last carrying a mirror that reflects even more kings, and finally the ghost of Banquo pointing to the procession. Macbeth realises nervously that these are all Banquo's descendants who will acquire kingships in numerous countries.

In light of the latest prophecies, Macbeth orders the disobedient Macduff's castle seized and sends assassins to slaughter all its inhabitants, including Macduff's wife and young son. Meanwhile, Macduff himself is in England meeting with Prince Malcolm (the elder of King Duncan's sons) to discuss Macbeth's tyrannical regime. Malcolm, who must be cautious for any traps, confesses that he would be a terrible leader if the crown were handed to him, but this is merely a lie to see how Macduff will react. Macduff shows that he is more loyal to Scotland than any particular leader, impressing Malcolm, who now reveals the lie and says Macduff has won his trust. The Thane of Ross arrives to deliver the horrible news to Macduff that his "castle is surprised, your wife and babes / Savagely slaughter'd" (IV.iii.204–205). With this news of his family's murders, Macduff is stricken with grief, but he is quickly provoked to vengeance by Malcolm who explains that he has raised an army with the help of the English King Edward. Together, they can defeat Macbeth and take back the Scottish throne.

=== Act V ===
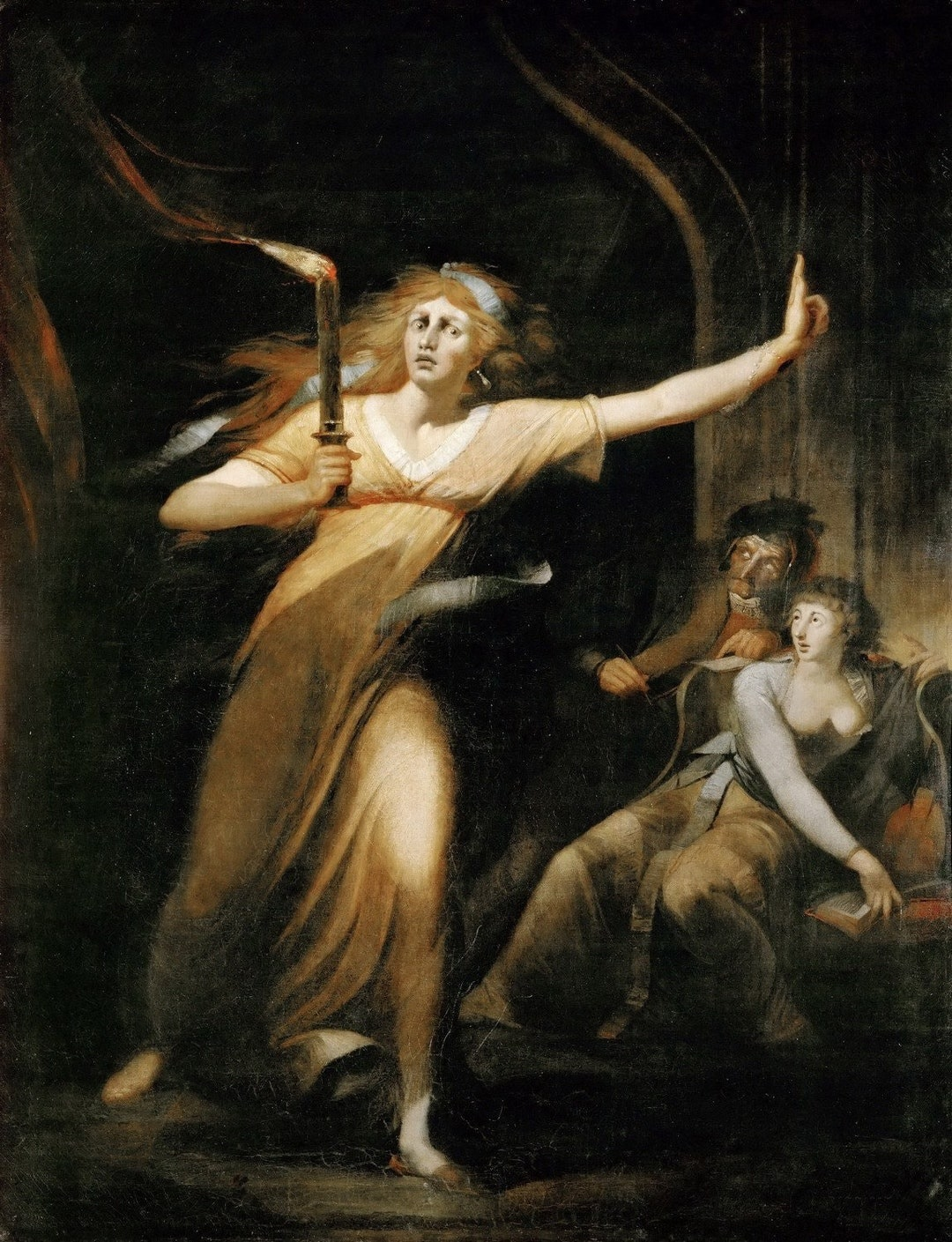
Lady Macbeth Sleepwalking by Henry Fuseli, 1784

At night, in the royal palace at Dunsinane, a doctor and a gentlewoman discuss Lady Macbeth's sudden frightening habit of sleepwalking. Lady Macbeth enters in a trance, bemoaning the recent murders and trying to wash off imaginary bloodstains from her hands. Her observers marvel at her guilt-ridden confessions. Meanwhile, Prince Malcolm's allied forces plan to join up at Birnam Wood, additionally supported by Macduff and defecting Scottish thanes alarmed by Macbeth's recent barbarities. While encamped in Birnam Wood, Malcolm orders his soldiers to cut down and carry tree boughs to camouflage their numbers.

As Macbeth prepares for the attack, he receives news that his wife has suddenly died, causing him to deliver a despairing "tomorrow, and tomorrow, and tomorrow" soliloquy (V.v.17–28). Still, he is emboldened by the witches' seeming guarantee of his invincibility against any "man of woman born", even as a servant reports that Malcolm's army is advancing on Dunsinane in the form of moving trees. The invaders take his castle, and Macbeth is confronted by Macduff. Macbeth tells him that he cannot be defeated by "one of woman born", but Macduff reveals that he was born by Caesarean section, not of natural childbirth. In the ensuing duel, Macbeth is killed offstage. Macduff reenters with Macbeth's severed head, and Malcolm discusses how order has been restored. He implies that Lady Macbeth's death was a suicide, declares his benevolent intentions for the country, promotes his thanes to earls, and invites all to see him crowned at Scone.

== Characters ==
- Duncan – king of Scotland
- Malcolm – Duncan's elder son
- Donalbain – Duncan's younger son
- Macbeth – a general in the army of King Duncan; originally Thane of Glamis, then Thane of Cawdor, and later king of Scotland
- Lady Macbeth – Macbeth's wife, and later queen of Scotland
- Banquo – Macbeth's friend and a general in the army of King Duncan
- Fleance – Banquo's son
- Macduff – Thane of Fife
- Lady Macduff – Macduff's wife
- Macduff's son – a young boy
- Ross, Lennox, Angus, Menteith, Caithness – Scottish thanes
- Siward – general of the English forces
- Young Siward – Siward's son
- Seyton – Macbeth's armourer and chief servant
- Hecate – queen of the witches
- Three Witches – three mysterious women who approach Macbeth and prophesy his fate
- Captain – in the Scottish army
- Murderers – employed by Macbeth
  - First and Second Murderers
  - Third Murderer – sent by Macbeth to assist the first two murderers
- Porter – gatekeeper at Macbeth's home
- Doctor – Lady Macbeth's doctor
- Doctor – at the English court
- Gentlewoman – Lady Macbeth's caretaker
- Lord – opposed to Macbeth
- First Apparition – armed head
- Second Apparition – bloody child
- Third Apparition – crowned child
- Attendants, Messengers, Servants, Soldiers

== Sources for the play ==
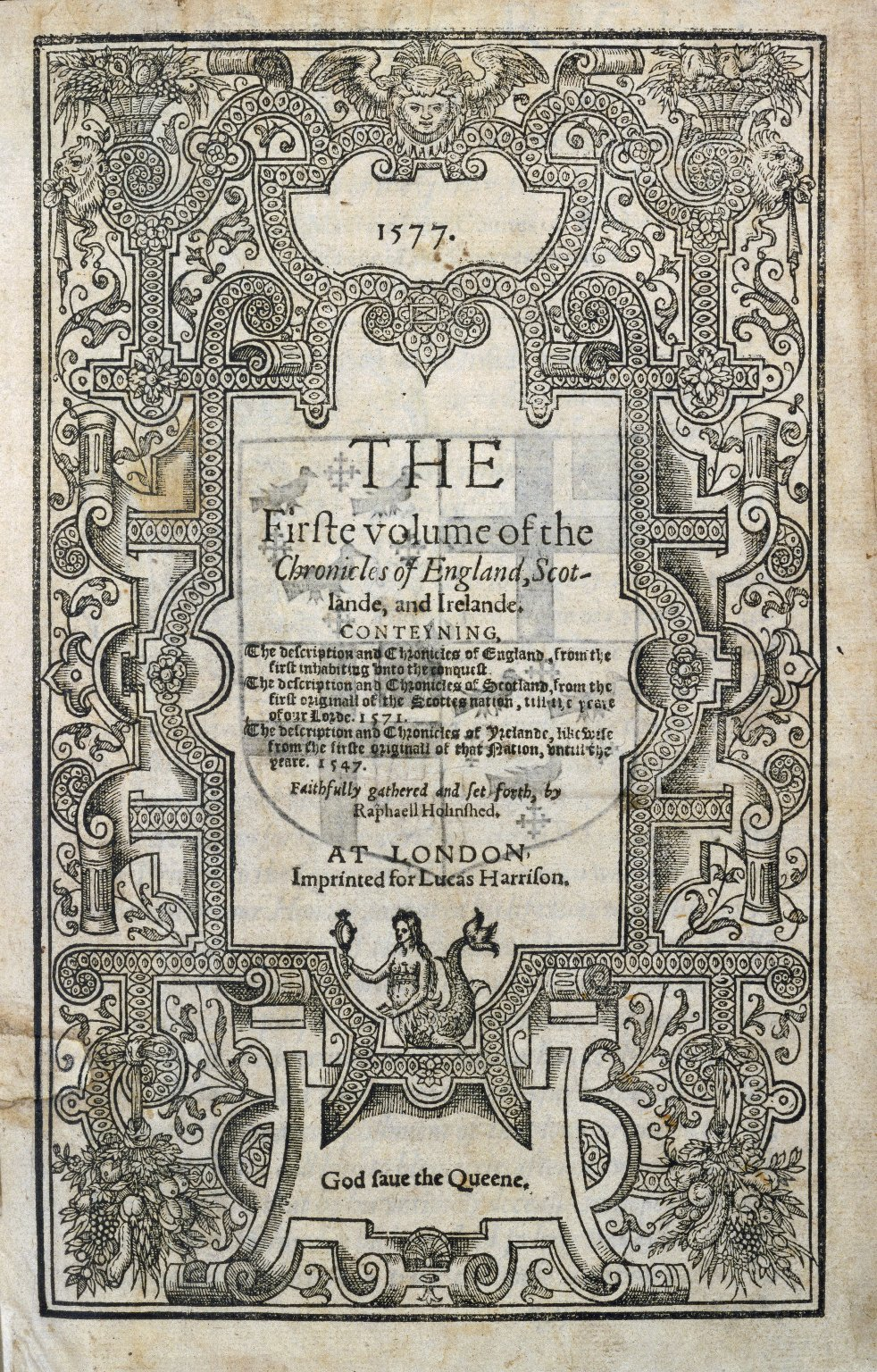
The first edition of Raphael Holinshed's Chronicles of England, Scotlande, and Irelande, printed in 1577

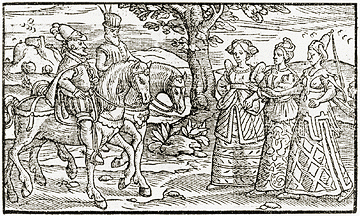
Macbeth and Banquo encountering the witches from Holinshed's Chronicles (1577)

Shakespeare's source for the story is Holinshed's Chronicles (1587), a history of England, Scotland, and Ireland familiar to Shakespeare and his contemporaries. He combines two very similar stories from Holinshed: one about a man named Donwald, and another about Macbeth, an 11th-century Scottish king. Donwald, a "captain of [a] castle", finds several of his kinsmen put to death by his king, Duff, for dealing with witches. After being pressured by his wife, he and four of his servants kill the king in his own house. In Chronicles, Macbeth is portrayed as a commander struggling to support the kingdom in the face of King Duncan's ineptitude. He and Banquo meet the three witches, who make exactly the same prophecies as in Shakespeare's version. Macbeth and Banquo then together plot the murder of Duncan, at Lady Macbeth's urging. Macbeth has a long, ten-year reign before eventually being overthrown by Macduff and Malcolm. The parallels between the two versions are clear. However, some scholars think that George Buchanan's Rerum Scoticarum Historia matches Shakespeare's version more closely. Buchanan's work was available in Latin in Shakespeare's day.

While medieval sources give information about King Macbeth, no medieval account mentions the Weird Sisters, Banquo, or Lady Macbeth, and, with the exception of the last-named, it is probable that none of them actually existed. The characters of Banquo, the Weird Sisters, and Lady Macbeth were first mentioned in 1527 by the Scottish historian Hector Boece in his book Historia Gentis Scotorum (History of the Scottish People), who wanted to denigrate Macbeth in order to strengthen the claim of the House of Stuart to the Scottish throne. Boece portrayed Banquo as an ancestor of the Stuart kings of Scotland, adding in a "prophecy" that the descendants of Banquo would be the rightful kings of Scotland while the Weird Sisters served to give a picture of King Macbeth as gaining the throne via dark supernatural forces. Macbeth did have a wife, but it is not clear if she was as power-hungry and ambitious as Boece portrayed her, which served his purpose of having even Macbeth realise he lacked a proper claim to the throne, and only took it at the urging of his wife. Holinshed accepted Boece's version of Macbeth's reign at face value and included it in his Chronicles. Shakespeare saw the dramatic possibilities in the story as related by Holinshed, and used it as the basis for the play.

No other version of the story has Macbeth kill the king in Macbeth's own castle. Scholars have seen this change of Shakespeare's as adding to the darkness of Macbeth's crime as the worst violation of hospitality. Versions of the story that were common at the time had Duncan being killed in an ambush at Inverness, not in a castle. Shakespeare took the detail of the king being murdered while a guest from the story of Donwald and King Duff.

Shakespeare made another important change. In Chronicles, Banquo is an accomplice in Macbeth's murder of King Duncan and plays an important part in ensuring that Macbeth, not Malcolm, takes the throne in the coup that follows. In Shakespeare's day, Banquo was thought to be an ancestor of the Stuart King James I. (In the 19th century it was established that Banquo is an unhistorical character; the Stuarts are actually descended from a Breton family which migrated to Scotland slightly later than Macbeth's time.) The Banquo portrayed in earlier sources is significantly different from the Banquo created by Shakespeare. Critics have proposed several reasons for this change. First, to portray the king's ancestor as a murderer would have been risky. Other authors of the time who wrote about Banquo, such as Jean de Schelandre in his Stuartide, also changed history by portraying Banquo as a noble man, not a murderer, probably for the same reasons. Second, Shakespeare may have altered Banquo's character simply because there was no dramatic need for another accomplice to the murder; there was, however, a need to give a dramatic contrast to Macbeth—a role which many scholars argue is filled by Banquo.

Other scholars maintain that a strong argument can be made for associating the tragedy with the Gunpowder Plot of 1605. As presented by Harold Bloom in 2008: "[S]cholars cite the existence of several topical references in Macbeth to the events of that year, namely the execution of the Father Henry Garnet for his alleged complicity in the Gunpowder Plot of 1605, as referenced in the porter's scene." Those arrested for their role in the Gunpowder Plot refused to give direct answers to the questions posed to them by their interrogators, which reflected the influence of the Jesuit practice of equivocation. Shakespeare, by having Macbeth say that demons "palter...in a double sense" and "keep the promise to our ear/And break it to our hope", confirmed James's belief that equivocation was a "wicked" practice, which reflected in turn the "wickedness" of the Catholic Church. Garnet had in his possession A Treatise on Equivocation, and in the play the Weird Sisters often engage in equivocation, for instance telling Macbeth that he could never be overthrown until "Great Birnan wood to high Dunsinane hill/Shall Come". Macbeth interprets the prophecy as meaning never, but in fact, the Three Sisters refer only to branches of the trees of Great Birnam coming to Dunsinane hill.

Other texts have been cited as possible sources for the play, such as Montaigne's Essays, Pierre Le Loyer's A Treatise of Specters, and, for some individual sections, the anonymous pamphlet Newes from Scotland (1591?), William Camden's Remains Concerning Britain (1605), and Samuel Daniel's The Queenes Arcadia (1606). Sandra Clark and Pamela Mason write, "It is hard to imagine that Shakespeare would not have consulted [Newes from Scotland], given that it is an account of a plot by Scottish witches against the King, the publication of which James himself commissioned. […] Shakespeare may also have consulted the King's own Daemonologie (1597)." On the other hand, Nicholas Brooke writes that there is "no evidence at all that Shakespeare made any use" of the Daemonologie and Newes from Scotland, and he compares them with certain passages only to "illustrate common beliefs".

Macbeth has been compared to Shakespeare's Antony and Cleopatra. As characters, both Antony and Macbeth seek a new world, even at the cost of the old one. Both fight for a throne and have a 'nemesis' to face to achieve that throne. For Antony, the nemesis is Octavius; for Macbeth, it is Banquo. At one point Macbeth even compares himself to Antony, saying "under Banquo / My Genius is rebuk'd, as it is said / Mark Antony's was by Caesar." Lastly, both plays contain powerful and manipulative female figures: Cleopatra and Lady Macbeth.

== Date and text ==
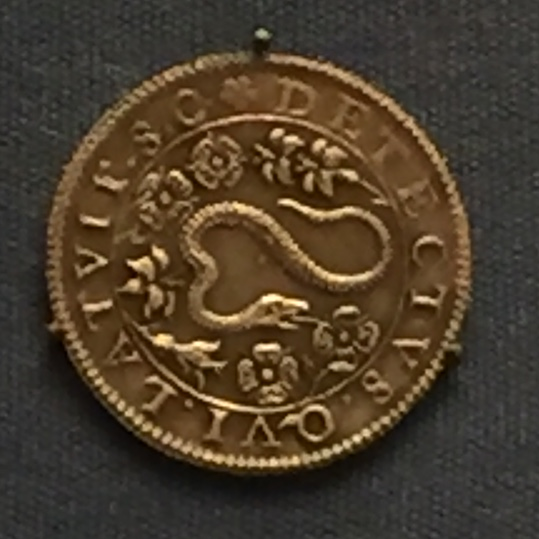
Silver coin struck in Holland to commemorate King James' survival of the Gunpowder Plot. The coin reads DETECTVS·QVI·LATVIT·S·C· (the concealed one is discovered) with a snake, representing the Catholic Society of Jesus, whom the Protestants accused of the plot.

While some scholars have placed the original writing of the play as early as 1599, most believe that the play is unlikely to have been composed earlier than 1603 as the play is widely seen to celebrate King James' Scottish ancestors and the Stuart accession to the throne in 1603 (James believed himself to be descended from Banquo), suggesting that the parade of eight kings—which the witches show Macbeth in a vision in Act IV—is a compliment to King James. Many scholars think the play was written in 1606 in the aftermath of the Gunpowder Plot, citing possible internal allusions to the 1605 plot and its ensuing trials. In fact, there are a great number of allusions and possible pieces of evidence alluding to the Plot, and, for this reason, a great many critics agree that Macbeth was written in the year 1606. Lady Macbeth's instructions to her husband, "Look like the innocent flower, but be the serpent under't" (1.5.74–75), may be an allusion to a medal that was struck in 1605 to commemorate King James' escape that depicted a serpent hiding among lilies and roses.

Particularly, the Porter's speech (2.3.1–21) in which he welcomes an "equivocator", a farmer, and a tailor to hell (2.3.8–13), has been argued to be an allusion to the 28 March 1606 trial and execution on 3 May 1606 of the Jesuit Henry Garnet, who used the alias "Farmer", with "equivocator" referring to Garnet's defence of "equivocation". (Note: For details on Garnet, see Perez Zagorin's article, "The Historical Significance of Lying and Dissimulation" (1996), in Social Research.) The porter says that the equivocator "committed treason enough for God's sake" (2.3.9–10), which specifically connects equivocation and treason and ties it to the Jesuit belief that equivocation was only lawful when used "for God's sake", strengthening the allusion to Garnet. The porter goes on to say that the equivocator "yet could not equivocate to heaven" (2.3.10–11), echoing grim jokes that were current on the eve of Garnet's execution: i.e. that Garnet would be "hanged without equivocation" and at his execution he was asked "not to equivocate with his last breath". The "English tailor" the porter admits to hell (2.3.13), has been seen as an allusion to Hugh Griffin, a tailor who was questioned by the Archbishop of Canterbury on 27 November and 3 December 1607 for the part he played in Garnet's "miraculous straw", an infamous head of straw that was stained with Garnet's blood that had congealed into a form resembling Garnet's portrait, which was hailed by Catholics as a miracle. The tailor Griffin became notorious and the subject of verses published with his portrait on the title page.

When James became king of England, a feeling of uncertainty settled over the nation. James was a Scottish king and the son of Mary, Queen of Scots, a staunch Catholic and English traitor. In the words of critic Robert Crawford, "Macbeth was a play for a post-Elizabethan England facing up to what it might mean to have a Scottish king. England seems comparatively benign, while its northern neighbour is mired in a bloody, monarch-killing past. ... Macbeth may have been set in medieval Scotland, but it was filled with material of interest to England and England's ruler." Critics argue that the content of the play is clearly a message to James, the new Scottish King of England. Likewise, the critic Andrew Hadfield noted the contrast the play draws between the saintly King Edward the Confessor of England who has the power of the royal touch to cure scrofula and whose realm is portrayed as peaceful and prosperous versus the bloody chaos of Scotland. James in his 1598 book The Trew Law of Free Monarchies had asserted that kings are always right, if not just, and his subjects owe him total loyalty at all times, writing that even if a king is a tyrant, his subjects must never rebel and just endure his tyranny for their own good. James had argued that the tyranny was preferable to the problems caused by rebellion which were even worse; Shakespeare by contrast in Macbeth argued for the right of the subjects to overthrow a tyrant king, in what appeared to be an implied criticism of James's theories if applied to England. Hadfield also noted a curious aspect of the play in that it implies that primogeniture is the norm in Scotland, but Duncan has to nominate his son Malcolm to be his successor while Macbeth is accepted without protest by the Scottish lords (thanes) as their king despite being an usurper. Hadfield argued this aspect of the play with the thanes apparently choosing their king was a reference to the Stuart claim to the English throne, and the attempts of the English Parliament to block the succession of James's Catholic mother, Mary, Queen of Scots, from succeeding to the English throne. Hadfield argued that Shakespeare implied that James was indeed the rightful king of England, but owed his throne not to divine favour as James would have it, but rather due to the willingness of the English Parliament to accept the Protestant son of the Catholic Mary, Queen of Scots, as their king.

Garry Wills provides further evidence that Macbeth is a Gunpowder Play (a type of play that emerged immediately following the events of the Gunpowder Plot). He points out that every Gunpowder Play contains "a necromancy scene, regicide attempted or completed, references to equivocation, scenes that test loyalty by use of deceptive language, and a character who sees through plots—along with a vocabulary similar to the Plot in its immediate aftermath (words like train, blow, vault) and an ironic recoil of the Plot upon the Plotters (who fall into the pit they dug)."

The play utilises a few key words that the audience at the time would recognize as allusions to the Plot. In one sermon in 1605, Lancelot Andrewes stated, regarding the failure of the Plotters on God's day, "Be they fair or foul, glad or sad (as the poet calleth Him) the great Diespiter, 'the Father of days' hath made them both." Shakespeare begins the play by using the words "fair" and "foul" in the first speeches of the witches and Macbeth. In the words of Jonathan Gil Harris, the play expresses the "horror unleashed by a supposedly loyal subject who seeks to kill a king and the treasonous role of equivocation. The play even echoes certain keywords from the scandal—the 'vault' beneath the House of Parliament in which Guy Fawkes stored thirty kegs of gunpowder and the 'blow' about which one of the conspirators had secretly warned a relative who planned to attend the House of Parliament on 5 November...Even though the Plot is never alluded to directly, its presence is everywhere in the play, like a pervasive odor."

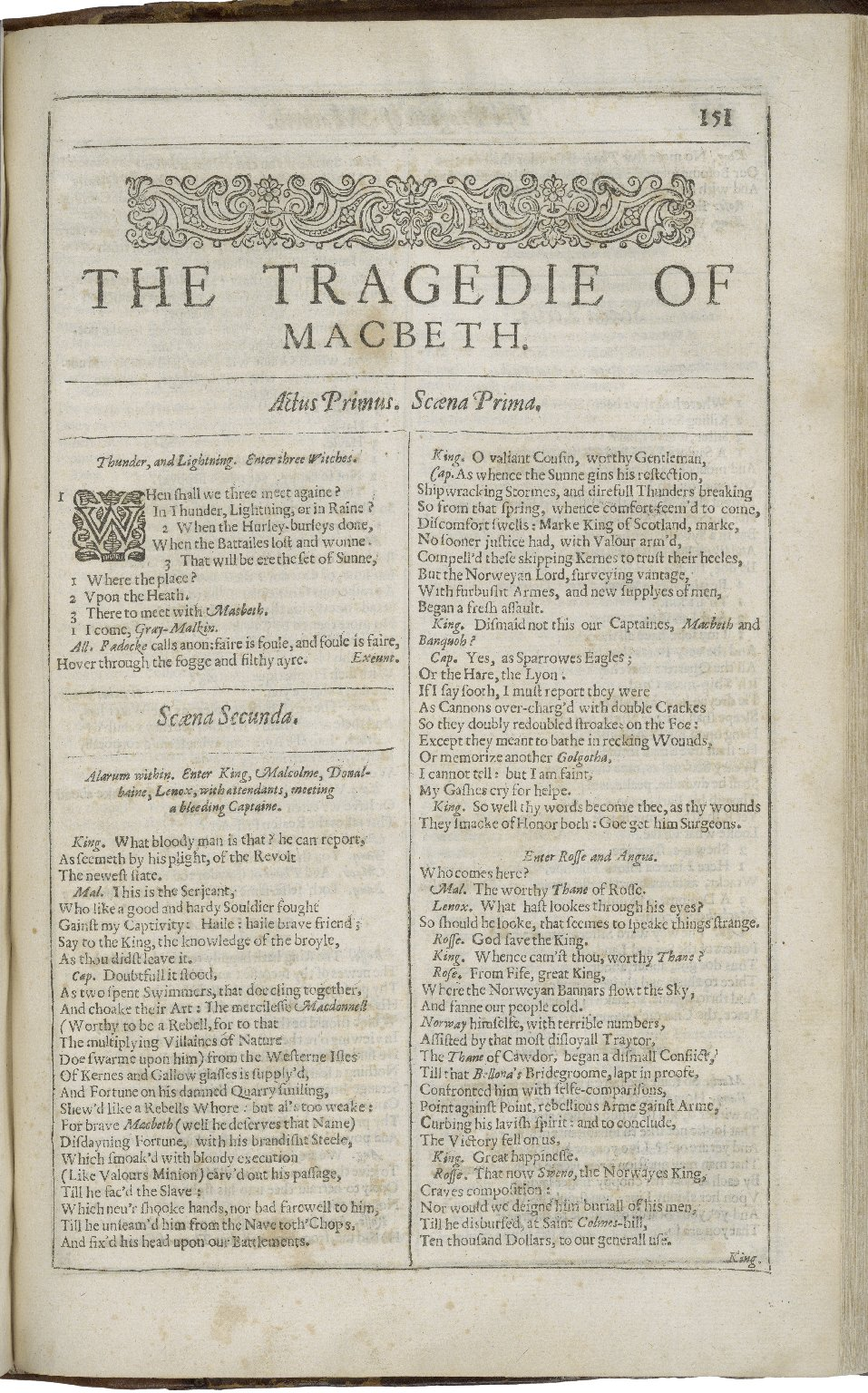
The first page of Macbeth, printed in the Second Folio of 1632

Scholars also cite an entertainment seen by King James at Oxford in the summer of 1605 that featured three "sibyls" like the weird sisters; Kermode surmises that Shakespeare could have heard about this and alluded to it with the weird sisters. However, A. R. Braunmuller in the New Cambridge edition finds the 1605–06 arguments inconclusive, and argues only for an earliest date of 1603.

One suggested allusion supporting a date in late 1606 is the first witch's dialogue about a sailor's wife: "'Aroint thee, witch!' the rump-fed ronyon cries./Her husband's to Aleppo gone, master o' the Tiger" (1.3.6–7). This has been thought to allude to the Tiger, a ship that returned to England 27 June 1606 after a disastrous voyage in which many of the crew were killed by pirates. A few lines later the witch speaks of the sailor, "He shall live a man forbid:/Weary se'nnights nine times nine" (1.3.21–22). The real ship was at sea 567 days, the product of 7x9x9, which has been taken as a confirmation of the allusion, which if correct, confirms that the witch scenes were either written or amended later than July 1606.

The play is not considered to have been written any later than 1607, since, as Kermode notes, there are "fairly clear allusions to the play in 1607". One notable reference is in Francis Beaumont's Knight of the Burning Pestle, first performed in 1607. The following lines (Act V, Scene 1, 24–30) are, according to scholars, a clear allusion to the scene in which Banquo's ghost haunts Macbeth at the dinner table:

When thou art at thy table with thy friends,
Merry in heart, and filled with swelling wine,
I'll come in midst of all thy pride and mirth,
Invisible to all men but thyself,
And whisper such a sad tale in thine ear
Shall make thee let the cup fall from thy hand,
And stand as mute and pale as death itself.

Macbeth was first printed in the First Folio of 1623 and the Folio is the only source for the text. Some scholars contend that the Folio text was abridged and rearranged from an earlier manuscript or prompt book. Often cited as interpolation are stage cues for two songs, whose lyrics are not included in the Folio but are included in Thomas Middleton's play The Witch, which was written between the accepted date for Macbeth (1606) and the printing of the Folio. Many scholars believe these songs were editorially inserted into the Folio, though whether they were Middleton's songs or preexisting songs is not certain. It is also widely believed that the character of Hecate, as well as some lines of the First Witch (4.1 124–131), were not part of Shakespeare's original play but were added by the Folio editors and possibly written by Middleton, though "there is no completely objective proof" of such interpolation.

== Themes and motifs ==
"Macbeth
The Prince of Cumberland! That is a step
On which I must fall down, or else o'erleap,
For in my way it lies. Stars, hide your fires;
Let not light see my black and deep desires.
The eye wink at the hand; yet let that be
Which the eye fears, when it is done, to see."

— Macbeth, Act I, Scene IV

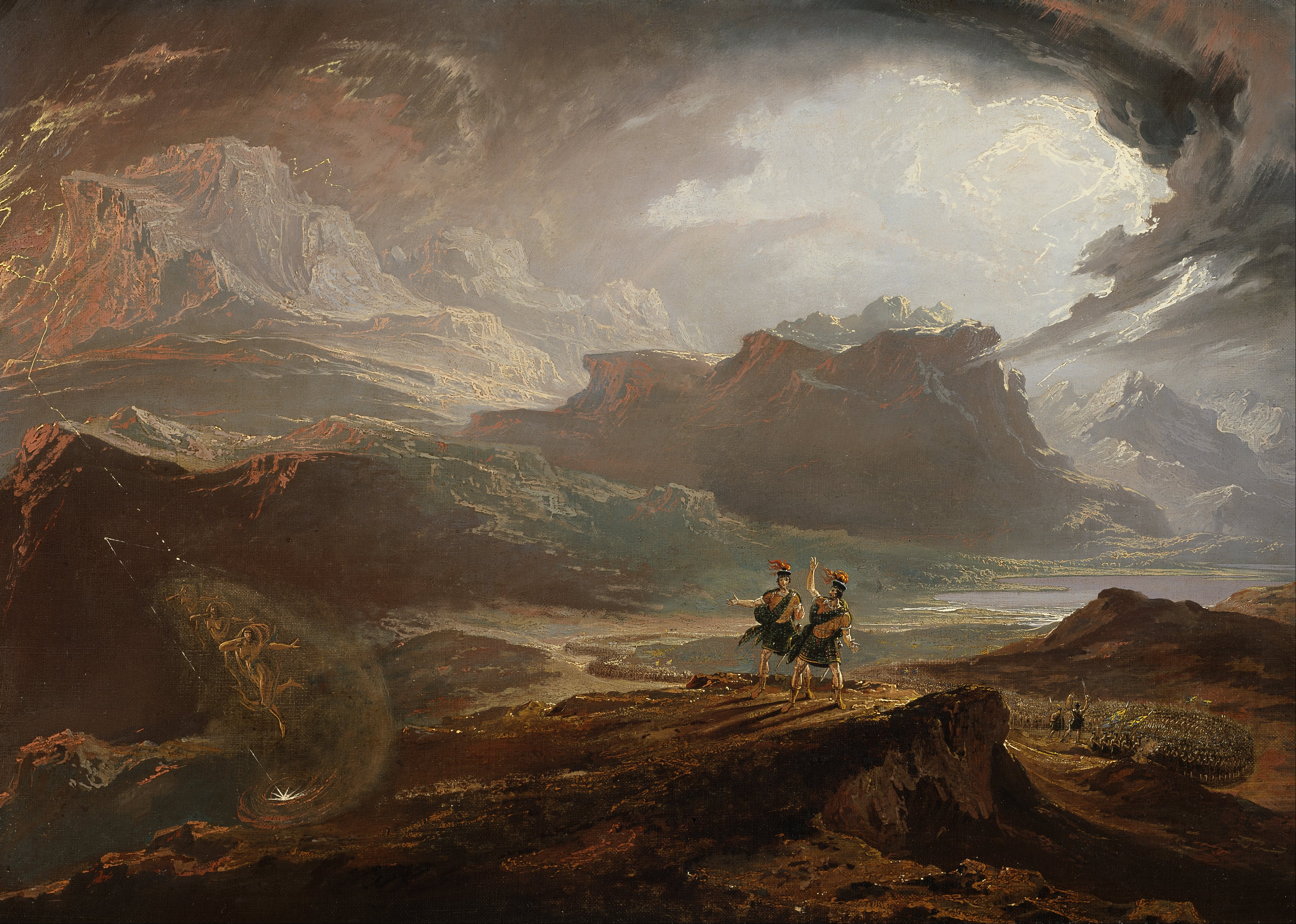
Macbeth by John Martin, 1820

Macbeth is an anomaly among Shakespeare's tragedies in certain critical ways. It is short: more than a thousand lines shorter than Othello and King Lear, and only slightly more than half as long as Hamlet. This brevity has suggested to many critics that the received version is based on a heavily cut source, perhaps a prompt-book for a particular performance. This would reflect other Shakespeare plays existing in both Quarto and the Folio, where the Quarto versions are usually longer than the Folio versions. Macbeth was first printed in the First Folio, but has no Quarto version – if there were a Quarto, it would probably be longer than the Folio version. That brevity has also been connected to other unusual features: the fast pace of the first act, which has seemed to be "stripped for action"; and the comparative flatness of the characters other than Macbeth. A. C. Bradley, in considering this question, concluded the play "always was an extremely short one", noting the witch scenes and battle scenes would have taken up some time in performance, remarking, "I do not think that, in reading, we feel Macbeth to be short: certainly we are astonished when we hear it is about half as long as Hamlet. Perhaps in the Shakespearean theatre too it seemed to occupy a longer time than the clock recorded."

=== As a tragedy of character ===
At least since the days of Samuel Johnson, analysis of the play has centred on the question of Macbeth's ambition, commonly seen as so dominant a trait that it defines the character. Johnson asserted that Macbeth, though esteemed for his military bravery, is wholly reviled by the reader.

This opinion recurs in the critical literature, most notably in the work of A. C. Bradley who discusses Macbeth as a character with courage and ambition, but also with the "imagination of a poet". For Bradley, Macbeth’s imagination is central to his character as he imagines the consequences of his own ambition and imagines the ghosts of his guilt with the ‘ecstasy of a poet’.

Additionally, an emphasis on character exists in the work of Caroline Spurgeon, who highlights the way Shakespeare uses the imagery of clothing to characterize his tragic hero. Spurgeon calls attention to how Macbeth is often described as wearing garments that either seem too big or too small for him, as his ambition is too big and his character too small for his new and unrightful role as king. After Macbeth is unexpectedly greeted with his new title as Thane of Cawdor as prophesied by the witches, Banquo comments:

New honours come upon him,
Like our strange garments, cleave not to their mould,
But with the aid of use

— I, 3, ll. 145–146

And, at the end, when the tyrant is at bay at Dunsinane, Caithness sees him as a man trying in vain to fasten a large garment on him with too small a belt:

He cannot buckle his distemper'd cause
Within the belt of rule

— V, 2, ll. 14–15

while Angus sums up what everybody thinks ever since Macbeth's accession to power:

now does he feel his title
Hang loose about him, like a giant's robe
upon a dwarfish thief

— V, 2, ll. 18–20).

Like Richard III, but without that character's perversely appealing exuberance, Macbeth wades through blood until his inevitable fall. As Kenneth Muir writes, "Macbeth has not a predisposition to murder; he has merely an inordinate ambition that makes murder itself seem to be a lesser evil than failure to achieve the crown." Some critics, such as E. E. Stoll, explain this characterisation as a holdover from Senecan or medieval tradition. Shakespeare's audience, in this view, expected villains to be wholly bad, and Senecan style, far from prohibiting a villainous protagonist, all but demanded it.

Yet for other critics, it has not been so easy to resolve the question of Macbeth's motivation. Robert Bridges, for instance, perceived a paradox: a character able to express such convincing horror before Duncan's murder would likely be incapable of committing the crime. For many critics, Macbeth's motivations in the first act appear vague and insufficient. John Dover Wilson hypothesised that Shakespeare's original text had an extra scene or scenes where husband and wife discussed their plans. This interpretation is not fully provable; however, the motivating role of ambition for Macbeth is universally recognised. The evil actions motivated by his ambition seem to trap him in a cycle of increasing evil, as Macbeth himself recognises:

I am in blood
Stepp'd in so far that, should I wade no more,
Returning were as tedious as go o'er.

— III, 4, ll. 165–167

While working on Russian translations of Shakespeare's works, Boris Pasternak compared Macbeth to Raskolnikov, the protagonist of Crime and Punishment by Fyodor Dostoevsky. Pasternak argues that "neither Macbeth or Raskolnikov is a born criminal or a villain by nature. They are turned into criminals by faulty rationalizations, by deductions from false premises." He goes on to argue that Lady Macbeth is "feminine ... one of those active, insistent wives" who becomes her husband's "executive, more resolute and consistent than he is himself". According to Pasternak, she is only helping Macbeth carry out his own wishes, to her own detriment.

=== As a tragedy of moral order ===
The disastrous consequences of Macbeth's ambition are not limited to him. Almost from the moment of the murder, the play depicts Scotland as a land shaken by inversions of the natural order. Shakespeare may have intended a reference to the great chain of being, although the play's images of disorder are mostly not specific enough to support detailed intellectual readings. The play was meant to be performed specifically for King James, whose belief in the divine right of kings suggests that the tragedy of Macbeth is distinctly moral. The King's own Daemonologie is believed to have inspired the structure of the witches' coven, making the supernatural world of Macbeth an inversion of the natural kingship, in which he struggles. As in Julius Caesar, though, perturbations in the political sphere are echoed and even amplified by events in the material world. Among the most often depicted of the inversions of the natural order is sleep. Macbeth's announcement that he has "murdered sleep" is figuratively mirrored in Lady Macbeth's sleepwalking.

Macbeth's generally accepted indebtedness to medieval tragedy is often seen as significant in the play's treatment of moral order. Glynne Wickham connects the play, through the Porter, to a mystery play on the harrowing of hell. Howard Felperin argues that the play has a more complex attitude toward "orthodox Christian tragedy" than is often admitted; he sees a kinship between the play and the tyrant plays within the medieval liturgical drama.

Some modern queer readings of Macbeth are concerned with the play's themes of "linearity, temporality, and succession," rather than transgressive sexuality. Lady Macbeth's request that the spirits she calls on "unsex" her is read by Madhavi Menon as indicative of sinthomosexual drive, and queer anti-maternity. The theme of androgyny is often seen as a special aspect of the theme of disorder, with feminist critic Dympna Callaghan arguing that Duncan's corpse stands in for both Macbeth and Lady Macbeth's "gender indeterminacy". Macbeth also plays with the inversion of normative gender roles, most famously in the case of the witches (and with Lady Macbeth as she appears in the first act). Whatever Shakespeare's degree of sympathy with such inversions, the play ends with a thorough return to normative gender values. Some feminist psychoanalytic critics, such as Janet Adelman, have connected the play's treatment of gender roles to its larger theme of inverted natural order, as expressed through the "malignant maternal power" of the witches and Lady Macbeth. Macbeth is punished for his violation of the moral order by being removed from the cycles of nature (which are figured as female); nature itself (as embodied in the movement of Birnam Wood) is part of the restoration of moral order.

=== As a poetic tragedy ===
Critics in the early twentieth century reacted against what they saw as an excessive dependence on the study of character in criticism of the play. This dependence, though most closely associated with A. C. Bradley, is clear as early as the time of Mary Cowden Clarke, who offered precise, if fanciful, accounts of the predramatic lives of Shakespeare's female leads. She suggested, for instance, that the child Lady Macbeth refers to in the first act died during a foolish military action.

Reacting to what he perceived as a concerning trend among critics to treat Shakespeare's characters as real people, L.C. Knights wrote "How Many Children Had Lady Macbeth?" where he argued that "a Shakespeare play is a dramatic poem" and that critics should place a greater emphasis on the ways the language works in the play. In the essay he quotes from G. Wilson Knight who similarly argued that "The persons, ultimately, are not human at all, but purely symbols of a poetic vision." Under this analytic lens, Lady Macbeth's invocation of a child she has "given suck" interacts with other images of infants in the play, such as the apparitions in Act 4.

=== Witchcraft and evil ===
The three "weird sisters" open the play and have been a frequent subject of interpretation. Some, like Peter Stallybrass and Diane Purkiss focus on the historical understanding of witchcraft, and others, like Janet Adelman and Stephen Greenblatt, focus more on the psychological or cultural symbolism.

King James I, the patron of Shakespeare's theater company The King's Men, had a well documented interest in witchcraft. He believed himself to be the victim of a murder plot involving witchcraft and he wrote a dissertation on witchcraft titled Daemonologie first published in 1597. It has often been suggested that the King's interest in witchcraft, along with the general popular interest it created, inspired the inclusion of the three witches in the play.

Diane Purkiss, a historian of witchcraft, has noted that Shakespeare pulled from many different witchcraft traditions, claiming that "the witches of Macbeth are a low-budget, frankly exploitative collage of randomly chosen bits of witch-lore, selected not for thematic significance but for its sensation value."

Other critics, like Greenblatt, argue that the witches do have thematic significance. He argues that "the theater and witchcraft are both constructed on the boundary between fantasy and reality, the border or membrane where the imagination and the corporeal world, figure and actuality, psychic disturbance and objective truth meet."

The witches introduce ambiguity into the play. They begin the play with phrases like " When the battle's lost and won" and end the first scene by saying "fair is foul and foul is fair/ Hover through the fog and filthy air" This ambiguity, rooted in paradoxical phrasing and language, can also be viewed as thematic significance. Stephen Orgel argues that the witches "live outside the social order, but they embody its contradictions: beneath the woman’s exterior is also a man; beneath the man’s exterior is also a woman; nature is full of competing claims, not ordered and hierarchical but deeply anarchic".

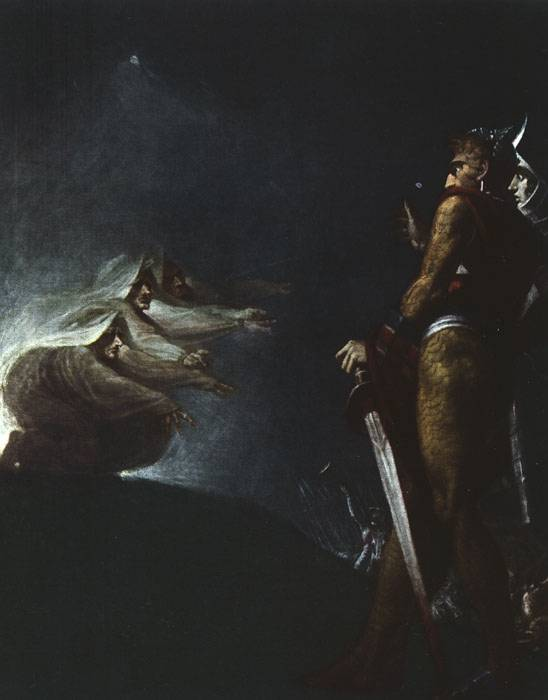
Macbeth and Banquo with the Witches by Henry Fuseli

In the play, the Three Witches represent darkness, chaos, and conflict, while their role is as agents and witnesses. Their presence communicates treason and impending doom. During Shakespeare's day, witches were seen as worse than rebels, "the most notorious traytor and rebell that can be". They were not only political traitors, but spiritual traitors as well. Much of the confusion that springs from them comes from their ability to straddle the play's borders between reality and the supernatural. They are so deeply entrenched in both worlds that it is unclear whether they control fate, or whether they are merely its agents. They defy logic, not being subject to the rules of the real world. The witches' lines in the first act: "Fair is foul, and foul is fair: Hover through the fog and filthy air" are often said to set the tone for the rest of the play by establishing a sense of confusion. Indeed, the play is filled with situations where evil is depicted as good, while good is rendered evil. The line "Double, double toil and trouble," communicates the witches' intent clearly: they seek only trouble for the mortals around them. The witches' spells are remarkably similar to the spells of the witch Medusa in Anthony Munday's play Fidele and Fortunio published in 1584, and Shakespeare may have been influenced by these.

While the witches do not tell Macbeth directly to kill King Duncan, they use a subtle form of temptation when they tell Macbeth that he is destined to be king. By placing this thought in his mind, they effectively guide him on the path to his own destruction. This follows the pattern of temptation used at the time of Shakespeare. First, they argued, a thought is put in a man's mind, then the person may either indulge in the thought or reject it. Macbeth indulges in it, while Banquo rejects it.

According to J. A. Bryant Jr., Macbeth also makes use of Biblical parallels, notably between King Duncan's murder and the murder of Christ:

No matter how one looks at it, whether as history or as tragedy, Macbeth is distinctively Christian. One may simply count the Biblical allusions as Richmond Noble has done; one may go further and study the parallels between Shakespeare's story and the Old Testament stories of Saul and Jezebel as Miss Jane H. Jack has done; or one may examine with W. C. Curry the progressive degeneration of Macbeth from the point of view of medieval theology.

== Superstition and "The Scottish Play" ==
While many today would say that any misfortune surrounding a production is mere coincidence, actors and others in the theatre industry often consider it bad luck to mention Macbeth by name while inside a theatre, and sometimes refer to it indirectly, for example as "The Scottish Play", or "The Bard's Play", or when referring to the characters and not the play, "Mr. and Mrs. M", or "The Scottish King".

This behaviour results from a superstition that saying the name of the play inside a theatre will bring bad luck to any given production, and perhaps cause physical injury or death to cast members. There are stories of accidents, misfortunes and even deaths taking place during runs of Macbeth.

There are many theories for how this superstition began. Some attribute it to real witches, who, unhappy with their representation in the play, cursed the play. There is no historical evidence for this. The origins of the superstition have been traced to a satirical article written by the humourist and theatre critic Max Beerbohm. In the article, written from the perspective of Samuel Pepys, he claims that in an early performance of the play the boy actor set to play Lady Macbeth became fatally ill and Shakespeare himself needed to play the part. Since then, the article claimed, Macbeth has been cursed. Beerbohm's article, though creating a fictional story, was a response to a long history of accidents and set-backs during Macbeth performances. During a 1672 performance of Macbeth in Amsterdam, the actor playing Macbeth committed murder on stage. In 1721, riots broke out during a performance in London, and in 1937 Lilian Baylis, a theater manager, died the night before a run of Macbeth began at the Old Vic.

According to the actor Sir Donald Sinden, in his Sky Arts TV series Great West End Theatres

Contrary to popular myth, Shakespeare's tragedy Macbeth is not the unluckiest play as superstition likes to portray it. Exactly the opposite! The origin of the unfortunate moniker dates back to repertory theatre days when each town and village had at least one theatre to entertain the public. If a play was not doing well, it would invariably get 'pulled' and replaced with a sure-fire audience pleaser – Macbeth guaranteed full-houses. So when the weekly theatre newspaper, The Stage was published, listing what was on in each theatre in the country, it was instantly noticed what shows had not worked the previous week, as they had been replaced by a definite crowd-pleaser. More actors have died during performances of Hamlet than in the "Scottish play" as the profession still calls it. It is forbidden to quote from it backstage as this could cause the current play to collapse and have to be replaced, causing possible unemployment.

Several methods exist to dispel the curse, depending on the actor. One, attributed to Michael York, is to immediately leave the building the stage is in with the person who uttered the name, walk around it three times, spit over their left shoulders, say an obscenity then wait to be invited back into the building. A related practice is to spin around three times as fast as possible on the spot, sometimes accompanied by spitting over their shoulder, and uttering an obscenity. Another popular "ritual" is to leave the room, knock three times, be invited in, and then quote a line from Hamlet. Yet another is to recite lines from The Merchant of Venice, thought to be a lucky play.

Patrick Stewart, on the radio program Ask Me Another, asserted "if you have played the role of the Scottish thane, then you are allowed to say the title, any time anywhere".

== Performance history ==
=== Shakespeare's day to the Interregnum ===
The only eyewitness account of Macbeth in Shakespeare's lifetime was recorded by Simon Forman, who saw a performance at the Globe on 20 April 1610. Scholars have noted discrepancies between Forman's account and the play as it appears in the Folio. For example, he makes no mention of the apparition scene, or of Hecate, of the man not of woman born, or of Birnam Wood. However, Clark observes that Forman's accounts were often inaccurate and incomplete (for instance omitting the statue scene from The Winter's Tale) and his interest did not seem to be in "giving full accounts of the productions".

As mentioned above, the Folio text is thought by some to be an alteration of the original play. This has led to the theory that the play in the Folio was an adaptation for indoor performance at the Blackfriars Theatre (which was operated by the King's Men from 1608) – and even speculation that it represents a specific performance before King James. The play contains more musical cues than any other play in the canon as well as a significant use of sound effects.

=== Restoration and eighteenth century ===
The chill of the grave seemed about you when you looked on her; there was the hush and damp of the charnel house at midnight ... your flesh crept and your breathing became uneasy ... the scent of blood became palpable to you.

— Sheridan Knowles on Sarah Siddons' sleepwalking scene

All theatres were closed down by the Puritan government on 6 September 1642. Upon the restoration of the monarchy in 1660, two patent companies (the King's Company and the Duke's Company) were established, and the existing theatrical repertoire divided between them. Sir William Davenant, founder of the Duke's Company, adapted Shakespeare's play to the tastes of the new era, and his version would dominate on stage for around eighty years. Among the changes he made were the expansion of the role of the witches, introducing new songs, dances and 'flying', and the expansion of the role of Lady Macduff as a foil to Lady Macbeth. There were, however, performances outside the patent companies: among the evasions of the Duke's Company's monopoly was a puppet version of Macbeth.

Macbeth was a favourite of the seventeenth-century diarist Samuel Pepys, who saw the play on 5 November 1664 ("admirably acted"), 28 December 1666 ("most excellently acted"), ten days later on 7 January 1667 ("though I saw it lately, yet [it] appears a most excellent play in all respects"), on 19 April 1667 ("one of the best plays for a stage ... that ever I saw"), again on 16 October 1667 ("was vexed to see Young, who is but a bad actor at best, act Macbeth in the room of Betterton, who, poor man! is sick"), and again three weeks later on 6 November 1667 ("[at] Macbeth, which we still like mightily"), yet again on 12 August 1668 ("saw Macbeth, to our great content"), and finally on 21 December 1668, on which date the king and court were also present in the audience.

The first professional performances of Macbeth in North America were probably those of The Hallam Company.

In 1744, David Garrick revived the play, abandoning Davenant's version and instead advertising it "as written by Shakespeare". In fact this claim was largely false: he retained much of Davenant's more popular business for the witches, wrote a lengthy death speech for Macbeth, and cut more than 10% of Shakespeare's play, including the drunken porter, the murder of Lady Macduff's son, and Malcolm's testing of Macduff. Hannah Pritchard was his greatest stage partner, having her premiere as his Lady Macbeth in 1747. He would later drop the play from his repertoire upon her retirement from the stage. Mrs. Pritchard was the first actress to achieve acclaim in the role of Lady Macbeth – at least partly due to the removal of Davenant's material, which made irrelevant moral contrasts with Lady Macduff. Garrick's portrayal focused on the inner life of the character, endowing him with an innocence vacillating between good and evil, and betrayed by outside influences. He portrayed a man capable of observing himself, as if a part of him remained untouched by what he had done, the play moulding him into a man of sensibility, rather than him descending into a tyrant.

John Philip Kemble first played Macbeth in 1778. Although usually regarded as the antithesis of Garrick, Kemble nevertheless refined aspects of Garrick's portrayal into his own. However it was the "towering and majestic" Sarah Siddons (Kemble's sister) who became a legend in the role of Lady Macbeth. In contrast to Hannah Pritchard's savage, demonic portrayal, Siddons' Lady Macbeth, while terrifying, was nevertheless – in the scenes in which she expresses her regret and remorse – tenderly human. And in portraying her actions as done out of love for her husband, Siddons deflected from him some of the moral responsibility for the play's carnage. Audiences seem to have found the sleepwalking scene particularly mesmerising: Hazlitt said of it that "all her gestures were involuntary and mechanical ... She glided on and off the stage almost like an apparition."

In 1794, Kemble dispensed with the ghost of Banquo altogether, allowing the audience to see Macbeth's reaction as his wife and guests see it, and relying upon the fact that the play was so well known that his audience would already be aware that a ghost enters at that point.

Ferdinand Fleck, notable as the first German actor to present Shakespeare's tragic roles in their fullness, played Macbeth at the Berlin National Theatre from 1787. Unlike his English counterparts, he portrayed the character as achieving his stature after the murder of Duncan, growing in presence and confidence: thereby enabling stark contrasts, such as in the banquet scene, which he ended babbling like a child.

=== Nineteenth century ===
Everyone seems to think Mrs McB is a Monstrousness & I can only see she's a woman – a mistaken woman – & weak – not a Dove – of course not – but first of all a wife.

— Ellen Terry

Performances outside the patent theatres were instrumental in bringing the monopoly to an end. Robert Elliston, for example, produced a popular adaptation of Macbeth in 1809 at the Royal Circus described in its publicity as "this matchless piece of pantomimic and choral performance", which circumvented the illegality of speaking Shakespeare's words through mimed action, singing, and doggerel verse written by J. C. Cross.

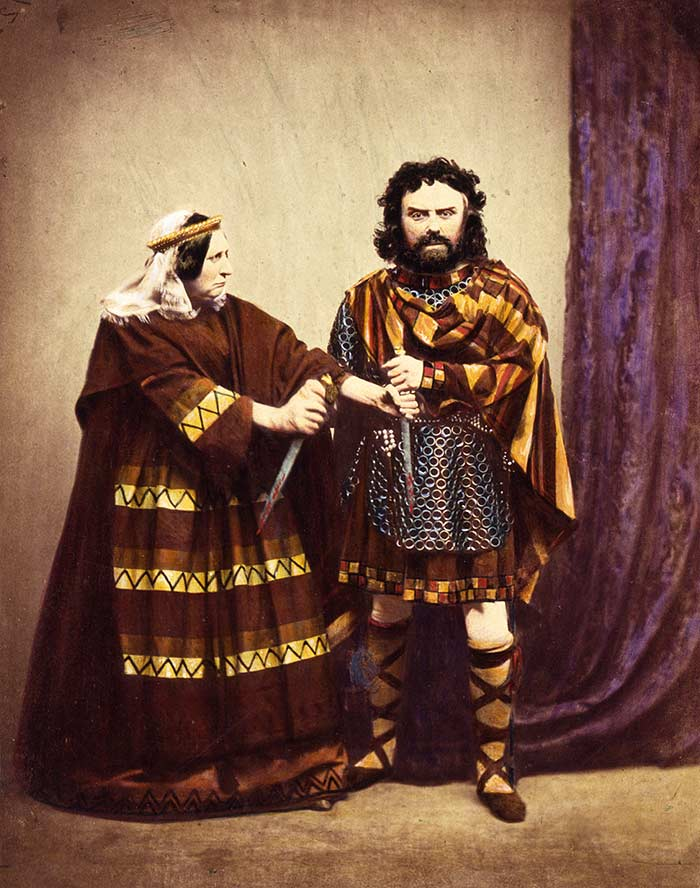
Ellen Kean and Charles Kean as the Macbeths, in historically accurate costumes, for an 1858 production

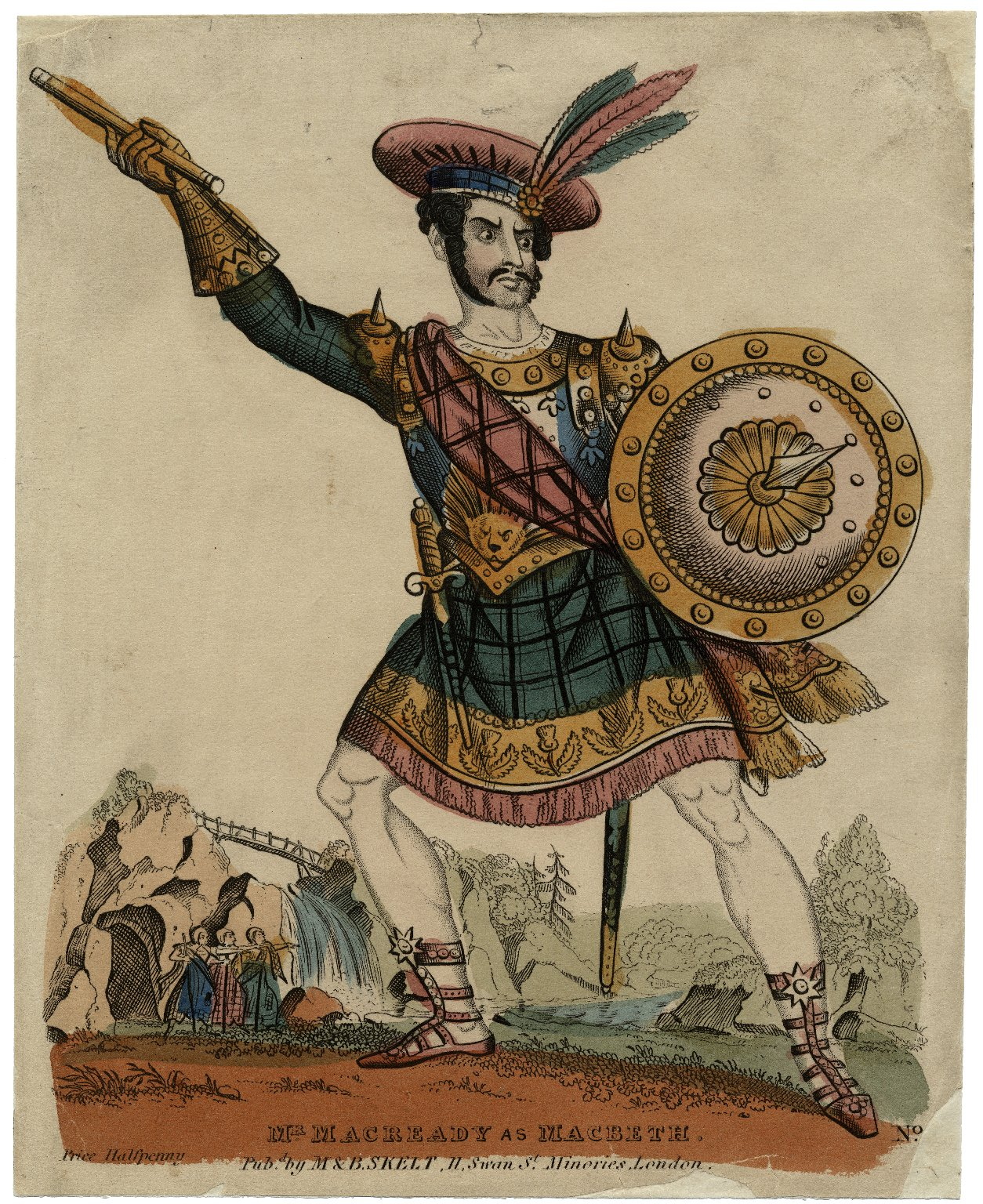
A print of William Charles Macready playing Macbeth, from a mid-19th century performance

In 1809, in an unsuccessful attempt to take Covent Garden upmarket, Kemble installed private boxes, increasing admission prices to pay for the improvements. The inaugural run at the newly renovated theatre was Macbeth, which was disrupted for over two months with cries of "Old prices!" and "No private boxes!" until Kemble capitulated to the protestors' demands.

Edmund Kean at Drury Lane gave a psychological portrayal of the central character, with a common touch, but was ultimately unsuccessful in the role. However he did pave the way for the most acclaimed performance of the nineteenth century, that of William Charles Macready. Macready played the role over a 30-year period, firstly at Covent Garden in 1820 and finally in his retirement performance. Although his playing evolved over the years, it was noted throughout for the tension between the idealistic aspects and the weaker, venal aspects of Macbeth's character. His staging was full of spectacle, including several elaborate royal processions.

In 1843 the Theatres Regulation Act finally brought the patent companies' monopoly to an end. From that time until the end of the Victorian era, London theatre was dominated by the actor-managers, and the style of presentation was "pictorial" – proscenium stages filled with spectacular stage-pictures, often featuring complex scenery, large casts in elaborate costumes, and frequent use of tableaux vivant. Charles Kean (son of Edmund), at London's Princess's Theatre from 1850 to 1859, took an antiquarian view of Shakespeare performance, setting his Macbeth in a historically accurate eleventh-century Scotland. His leading lady, Ellen Tree, created a sense of the character's inner life: The Times' critic saying "The countenance which she assumed ... when luring on Macbeth in his course of crime, was actually appalling in intensity, as if it denoted a hunger after guilt." At the same time, special effects were becoming popular: for example in Samuel Phelps' Macbeth the witches performed behind green gauze, enabling them to appear and disappear using stage lighting.

In 1849, rival performances of the play sparked the Astor Place riot in Manhattan. The popular American actor Edwin Forrest, whose Macbeth was said to be like "the ferocious chief of a barbarous tribe" played the central role at the Broadway Theatre to popular acclaim, while the "cerebral and patrician" English actor Macready, playing the same role at the Astor Place Opera House, suffered constant heckling. The existing enmity between the two men (Forrest had openly hissed Macready at a recent performance of Hamlet in Britain) was taken up by Forrest's supporters – formed from the working class and lower middle class and anti-British agitators, keen to attack the upper-class pro-British patrons of the Opera House and the colonially minded Macready. Nevertheless, Macready performed the role again three days later to a packed house while an angry mob gathered outside. The militia tasked with controlling the situation fired into the mob. In total, 31 rioters were killed and over 100 injured.

Charlotte Cushman is unique among nineteenth-century interpreters of Shakespeare in achieving stardom in roles of both genders. Her New York debut was as Lady Macbeth in 1836, and she would later be admired in London in the same role in the mid-1840s. Helen Faucit was considered the embodiment of early-Victorian notions of femininity. But for this reason she largely failed when she eventually played Lady Macbeth in 1864: her serious attempt to embody the coarser aspects of Lady Macbeth's character jarred harshly with her public image. Adelaide Ristori, the great Italian actress, brought her Lady Macbeth to London in 1863 in Italian, and again in 1873 in an English translation cut in such a way as to be, in effect, Lady Macbeth's tragedy.

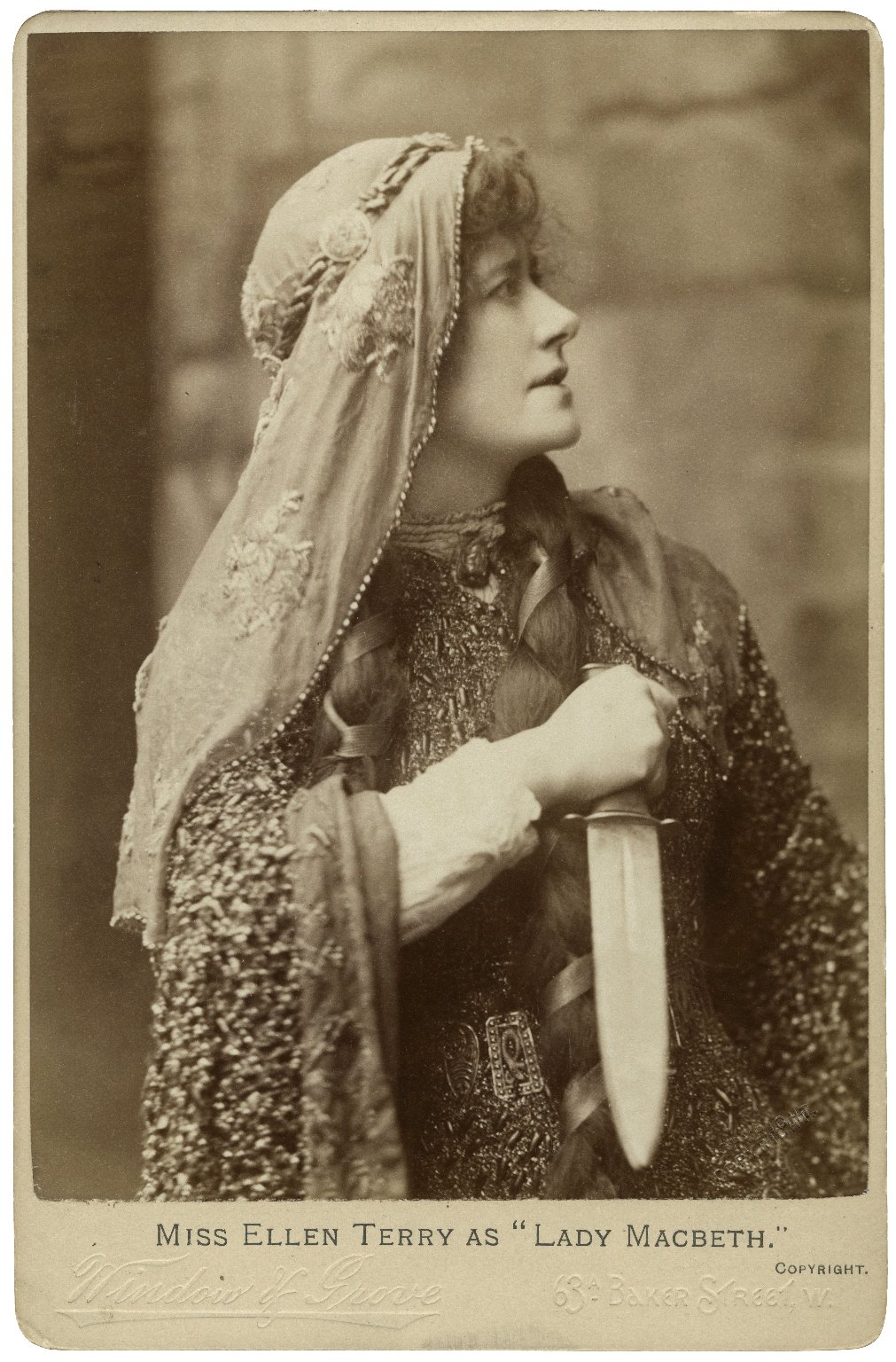
Photograph of Ellen Terry as Lady Macbeth, an 1888 production

Henry Irving was the most successful of the late-Victorian actor-managers, but his Macbeth failed to curry favour with audiences. His desire for psychological credibility reduced certain aspects of the role: He described Macbeth as a brave soldier but a moral coward, and played him untroubled by conscience – clearly already contemplating the murder of Duncan before his encounter with the witches. (Note: Similar criticisms were made of Friedrich Mitterwurzer in Germany, whose performances of Macbeth had many unintentional parallels with Irving's.) Irving's leading lady was Ellen Terry, but her Lady Macbeth was unsuccessful with the public, for whom a century of performances influenced by Sarah Siddons had created expectations at odds with Terry's conception of the role.

Late nineteenth-century European Macbeths aimed for heroic stature, but at the expense of subtlety: Tommaso Salvini in Italy and Adalbert Matkowsky in Germany were said to inspire awe, but elicited little pity.

=== 20th century to present ===
And then Lady Macbeth says 'He that's coming / Must be provided for.' It's an amazing line. She's going to play hostess to Duncan at Dunsinane, and 'provide' is what gracious hostesses always do. It's a wonder of a line to play because the reverberations do the acting for you, make the audience go "Aaaagh!"

— Sinéad Cusack

Two developments changed the nature of Macbeth performance in the 20th century: first, developments in the craft of acting itself, especially the ideas of Stanislavski and Brecht; and second, the rise of the dictator as a political icon. The latter has not always assisted the performance: it is difficult to sympathise with a Macbeth based on Hitler, Stalin, or Idi Amin.

Barry Jackson, at the Birmingham Repertory Theatre in 1923, was the first of the 20th-century directors to costume Macbeth in modern dress.

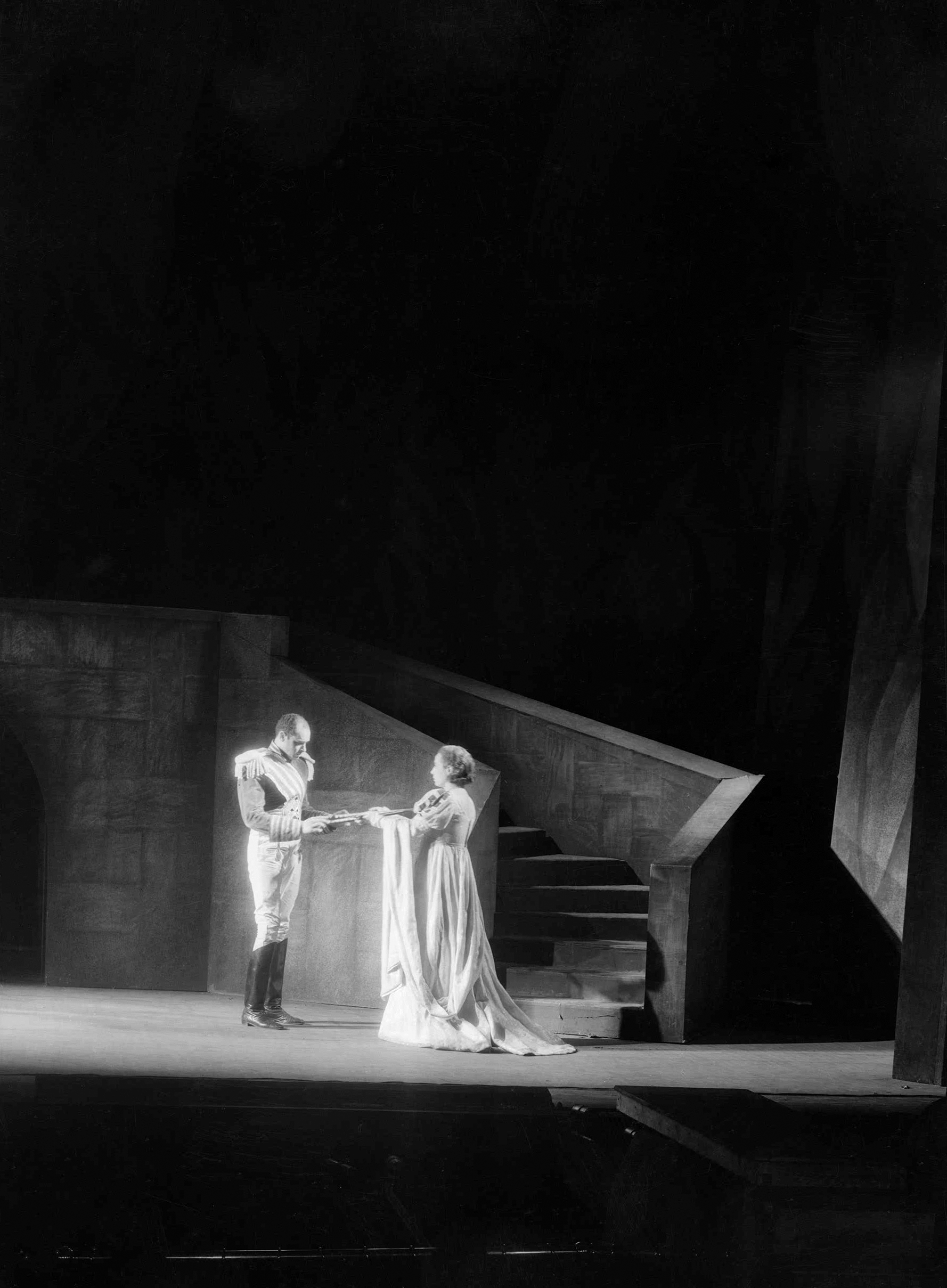
Jack Carter and Edna Thomas in the Federal Theatre Project production that came to be known as the Voodoo Macbeth (1936)

In 1936, a decade before his film adaptation of the play, Orson Welles directed Macbeth for the Negro Theatre Unit of the Federal Theatre Project at the Lafayette Theatre in Harlem, using black actors and setting the action in Haiti: with drums and Voodoo rites to establish the Witches scenes. The production, dubbed The Voodoo Macbeth, proved inflammatory in the aftermath of the Harlem riots, accused of making fun of black culture and as "a campaign to burlesque negroes" until Welles persuaded crowds that his use of black actors and voodoo made important cultural statements.

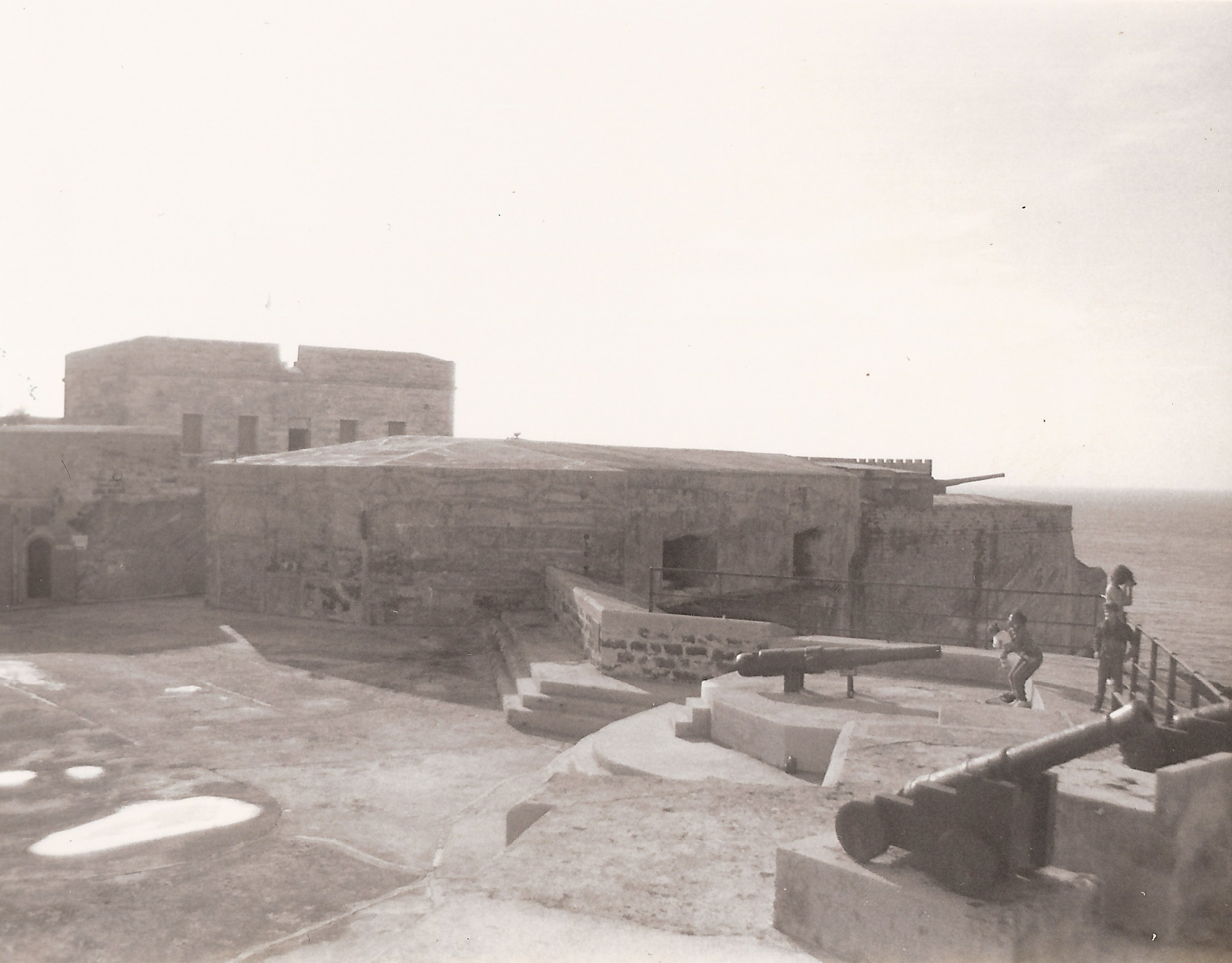
Fort St. Catherine's, Bermuda, the site of a 1953 outdoor production

A performance which is frequently referenced as an example of the play's curse was the outdoor production directed by Burgess Meredith in 1953 in the British colony of Bermuda, starring Charlton Heston. Using the imposing spectacle of Fort St. Catherine as a key element of the set, the production was plagued by a host of mishaps, including Charlton Heston being burned when his tights caught fire.

Some critics contend there were three great Macbeths on the English-speaking stage in the 20th century, all of them commencing at Stratford-upon-Avon: Laurence Olivier in 1955, Ian McKellen in 1976 and Antony Sher in 1999. Olivier's portrayal (directed by Glen Byam Shaw, with Vivien Leigh as Lady Macbeth) was immediately hailed as a masterpiece. Kenneth Tynan said it succeeded because Olivier built the role to a climax at the end of the play, whereas most actors spend all they have in the first two acts.

The play caused difficulties for the Royal Shakespeare Company, especially at the (then) Shakespeare Memorial Theatre. Peter Hall's 1967 production was (in Michael Billington's words) "an acknowledged disaster" with the use of real leaves from Birnham Wood getting first-night laughs, and Trevor Nunn's 1974 production was (Billington again) "an over-elaborate religious spectacle".

But Nunn achieved success for the RSC in his 1976 production at the intimate Other Place, with Ian McKellen and Judi Dench in the central roles. A small cast worked within a simple circle, and McKellen's Macbeth had nothing noble or likeable about him, being a manipulator in a world of manipulative characters. They were a young couple, physically passionate, "not monsters but recognisable human beings", (Note: Michael Billington, cited by Gay.) but their relationship atrophied as the action progressed.

The RSC again achieved critical success in Gregory Doran's 1999 production at The Swan, with Antony Sher and Harriet Walter in the central roles, once again demonstrating the suitability of the play for smaller venues. Doran's witches spoke their lines to a theatre in absolute darkness, and the opening visual image was the entrance of Macbeth and Banquo in the berets and fatigues of modern warfare, carried on the shoulders of triumphant troops. In contrast to Nunn, Doran presented a world in which king Duncan and his soldiers were ultimately benign and honest, heightening the deviance of Macbeth (who seems genuinely surprised by the witches' prophecies) and Lady Macbeth in plotting to kill the king. The play said little about politics, instead powerfully presenting its central characters' psychological collapse.

Macbeth returned to the RSC in 2018, when Christopher Eccleston played the title role, with Niamh Cusack as his wife, Lady Macbeth. The play later transferred to the Barbican in London.

In Soviet-controlled Prague in 1977, faced with the illegality of working in theatres, Pavel Kohout adapted Macbeth into a 75-minute abridgement for five actors, suitable for "bringing a show in a suitcase to people's homes". (Note: See also Tom Stoppard's Dogg's Hamlet, Cahoot's Macbeth.)

Spectacle was unfashionable in Western theatre throughout the 20th century. In East Asia, however, spectacular productions have achieved great success, including Yukio Ninagawa's 1980 production with Masane Tsukayama as Macbeth, set in the 16th century Japanese Civil War. The same director's tour of London in 1987 was widely praised by critics, even though (like most of their audience) they were unable to understand the significance of Macbeth's gestures, the huge Buddhist altar dominating the set, or the petals falling from the cherry trees.

Xu Xiaozhong's 1980 Central Academy of Drama production in Beijing made every effort to be unpolitical (necessary in the aftermath of the Cultural Revolution): yet audiences still perceived correspondences between the central character (whom the director had actually modelled on Louis Napoleon) and Mao Zedong. Shakespeare has often been adapted to indigenous theatre traditions, for example the Kunju Macbeth of Huang Zuolin performed at the inaugural Chinese Shakespeare Festival of 1986. Similarly, B. V. Karanth's Barnam Vana of 1979 had adapted Macbeth to the Yakshagana tradition of Karnataka, India. In 1997, Lokendra Arambam created Stage of Blood, merging a range of martial arts, dance and gymnastic styles from Manipur, performed in Imphal and in England. The stage was literally a raft on a lake.

Throne of Blood (蜘蛛巣城 Kumonosu-jō, Spider Web Castle) is a 1957 Japanese samurai film co-written and directed by Akira Kurosawa. The film transposes Macbeth from Medieval Scotland to feudal Japan, with stylistic elements drawn from Noh drama. Kurosawa was a fan of the play and planned his own adaptation for several years, postponing it after learning of Orson Welles' Macbeth (1948). The film won two Mainichi Film Awards.

The play has been translated and performed in various languages in different parts of the world, and Media Artists was the first to stage its Punjabi adaptation in India. The adaptation by Balram and the play directed by Samuel John have been universally acknowledged as a milestone in Punjabi theatre. The unique attempt involved trained theatre experts and the actors taken from a rural background in Punjab. Punjabi folk music imbued the play with the native ethos as the Scottish setting of Shakespeare's play was transposed into a Punjabi milieu.

In 1992, Robin Lorimer and David Purves independently translated MacBeth into Scots. Purves's translation was staged by Theatre Alba in Duddingston Kirk Gardens on the Edinburgh Festival Fringe in August 2002.

In 2021, Saoirse Ronan starred in The Tragedy of Macbeth at the Almeida Theatre in London. The following year a revival production opened on Broadway with Daniel Craig and Ruth Negga to middling reviews.

A new production starring David Tennant and Cush Jumbo ran at London's Donmar Warehouse from 8 December 2023 to 10 February 2024. Max Webster directed the production. The show received 3 Laurence Olivier Award nominations, including Best Revival. It transferred to the Harold Pinter Theatre in the West End from 1 October 2024 for a limited run. The production will transfer to Broadway in 2027 with Anthony Mackie appearing as the Thane of Cawdor. It is planned to run from late March or early April until July.

=== Operas ===
Macbeth was adapted into an Italian opera (Macbeth) by composer Giuseppe Verdi and librettist Francesco Maria Piave in 1847 (revised in French in 1865). Ernest Bloch's Macbeth, to a libretto by Edmond Fleg, premiered in Paris in 1910. An English opera adaptation of the play was created by Lawrance Collingwood in 1927.

Contemporary opera adaptations include Luke Styles' Macbeth (2015) and Pascal Dusapin's Macbeth Underworld (2019).

An indirect adaptation is Dmitri Shostakovich's Lady Macbeth of Mtsensk (1934), based on the novella of the same name by Nikolai Leskov.

== See also ==
- Macbeth on screen
- Cultural references to Macbeth
- List of idioms attributed to Shakespeare

== Sources ==
=== Editions of Macbeth ===
- Bloom, Harold, ed. (2008). Macbeth. Bloom's Shakespeare Through the Ages. New York: Chelsea House. ISBN 978-0-7910-9842-4.
- Braunmuller, Albert R., ed. (1997). Macbeth. The New Cambridge Shakespeare. Cambridge: Cambridge University Press. ISBN 978-0-521-29455-3.
- Brooke, Nicholas, ed. (2008). Macbeth. The Oxford Shakespeare. Oxford: Oxford University Press. ISBN 978-0-19-953583-5.
- Clark, Sandra; Mason, Pamela, eds. (2015). Macbeth. The Arden Shakespeare, third series. London: Bloomsbury Publishing. ISBN 978-1-904271-40-6.
- Kermode, Frank, ed. (1974). Macbeth. The Riverside Shakespeare. Boston: Houghton Mifflin. ISBN 0-395-04402-2.
- Muir, Kenneth, ed. (1984) [1951]. Macbeth (11th ed.). The Arden Shakespeare, second series. ISBN 978-1-903436-48-6.
- Papadinis, Demitra, ed. (2012). The Tragedie of Macbeth: A Frankly Annotated First Folio Edition. Jefferson, North Carolina: McFarland. ISBN 978-0-7864-6479-1.
- Sprague, Homer B., ed. (1889). Shakespeare's Tragedy of Macbeth. Silver series of classics. New York: Silver, Burdett, & Co. hdl:2027/hvd.hn3mu1.

=== Secondary sources ===
- "'Scottish Curse' Struck Heston in Bermuda". Bernews. 7 April 2013. Archived from the original on 12 November 2017.
- Brown, John Russell, ed. (2001). The Oxford Illustrated History of the Theatre. Oxford: Oxford University Press. ISBN 978-0-19-285442-1.
  - Booth, Michael R. (2001). "Nineteenth-Century Theatre". In Brown, John Russell (ed.). The Oxford Illustrated History of the Theatre. Oxford: Oxford University Press. pp. 299–340. ISBN 978-0-19-285442-1.
- Bryant Jr., J. A. (1961). Hippolyta's View: Some Christian Aspects of Shakespeare's Plays. University of Kentucky Press. hdl:2027/mdp.39015001989410. OL 5820486M.
- Coddon, Karin S. (1989). "'Unreal Mockery': Unreason and the Problem of Spectacle in Macbeth". ELH. 56 (3). The Johns Hopkins University Press: 485–501. doi:10.2307/2873194. eISSN 1080-6547. ISSN 0013-8304. JSTOR 2873194.
- Coursen, Herbert R. (1997). Macbeth: A Guide to the Play. Greenwood Press. ISBN 0-313-30047-X.
- Crawford, Robert (13 March 2010). "Macbeth, A True Story by Fiona Watson: The whole truth about Macbeth is not enough for Robert Crawford". The Guardian. Archived from the original on 29 January 2018.
- Doran, Susan (2024). From Tudor to Stuart: the regime change from Elizabeth I to James I. Oxford University Press. ISBN 978-0-19-875464-0.
- Dyce, Alexander, ed. (1843). The Works of Beaumont and Fletcher. Vol. 1. London: Edward Moxen. hdl:2027/osu.32435063510085. OL 7056519M.
- Faires, Robert (13 October 2000). "The curse of the play". The Austin Chronicle. Archived from the original on 27 February 2021.
- Frye, Roland Mushat (1987). "Launching the Tragedy of Macbeth: Temptation, Deliberation, and Consent in Act I". Huntington Library Quarterly. 50 (3). University of Pennsylvania Press: 249–261. doi:10.2307/3817399. eISSN 1544-399X. ISSN 0018-7895. JSTOR 3817399.
- Garber, Marjorie B. (2008). Profiling Shakespeare. Routledge. ISBN 978-0-415-96446-3.
- de Grazia, Margreta; Wells, Stanley, eds. (2001). The Cambridge Companion to Shakespeare. Cambridge Companions to Literature. Cambridge: Cambridge University Press. doi:10.1017/CCOL0521650941. ISBN 978-1-139-00010-9. Archived from the original on 30 September 2022 – via Cambridge Core.
  - Potter, Lois (2001). "Shakespeare in the theatre, 1660–1900". In de Grazia, Margreta; Wells, Stanley (eds.). The Cambridge Companion to Shakespeare. Cambridge Companions to Literature. Cambridge: Cambridge University Press. pp. 183–198. doi:10.1017/CCOL0521650941.012. ISBN 978-1-139-00010-9 – via Cambridge Core.
- Gurr, Andrew (2009). The Shakespearean Stage 1574–1642 (4th ed.). Cambridge: Cambridge University Press. doi:10.1017/CBO9780511819520. ISBN 978-0-511-81952-0 – via Cambridge Core.
- Hadfield, Andrew (2004). Shakespeare and Renaissance Politics. Arden Critical Companions. ISBN 1-903436-17-6.
- Hardy, Jessie Moniz (16 October 2014). "In Bermuda, Shakespeare in all his glory". The Royal Gazette.
- Harris, Jonathan Gil (2007). "The Smell of Macbeth". Shakespeare Quarterly. 58 (4). Folger Shakespeare Library: 465–486. doi:10.1353/shq.2007.0062. eISSN 1538-3555. ISSN 0037-3222. JSTOR 4625011. S2CID 9376451.
- Beaumont, Francis (1969). Hattaway, Michael (ed.). The Knight of the Burning Pestle. The New Mermaids. London: Ernest Benn. hdl:2027/mdp.39015005314193.
- Hodgdon, Barbara; Worthen, W. B., eds. (2005). A Companion to Shakespeare and Performance. Blackwell Publishing. ISBN 978-1-4051-8821-0.
  - McLuskie, Kathleen (2005). "Shakespeare Goes Slumming: Harlem '37 and Birmingham '97". In Hodgdon, Barbara; Worthen, W. B. (eds.). A Companion to Shakespeare and Performance. Blackwell Publishing. pp. 249–266. ISBN 978-1-4051-8821-0.
- Jackson, Russell, ed. (2007). The Cambridge Companion to Shakespeare on Film. Cambridge Companions to Literature (2nd ed.). Cambridge: Cambridge University Press. doi:10.1017/CCOL0521866006. ISBN 978-1-139-00143-4 – via Cambridge Core.
  - Forsyth, Neil (2007). "Shakespeare the illusionist: filming the supernatural". In Jackson, Russell (ed.). The Cambridge Companion to Shakespeare on Film. Cambridge Companions to Literature (2nd ed.). Cambridge: Cambridge University Press. pp. 280–302. doi:10.1017/CCOL0521866006.017. ISBN 978-1-139-00143-4 – via Cambridge Core.
- Kliman, Bernice; Santos, Rick (2005). Latin American Shakespeares. Fairleigh Dickinson University Press. ISBN 0-8386-4064-8.
- Lanier, Douglas (2002). Shakespeare and Modern Popular Culture. Oxford Shakespeare Topics. Oxford: Oxford University Press. ISBN 978-0-19-818706-6.
- Loomis, Edward Alleyn (1956). "Master of the Tiger". Shakespeare Quarterly. 7 (4). Folger Shakespeare Library: 457. doi:10.2307/2866386. eISSN 1538-3555. ISSN 0037-3222. JSTOR 2866386.
- Maskell, D. W. (1971). "The Transformation of History into Epic: The Stuartide (1611) of Jean de Schelandre". The Modern Language Review. 66 (1). Modern Humanities Research Association: 53–65. doi:10.2307/3722467. eISSN 2222-4319. ISSN 0026-7937. JSTOR 3722467.
- Muir, Kenneth (1985). Shakespeare: Contrasts and Controversies. University of Oklahoma Press. ISBN 978-0-8061-1940-3.
- Nagarajan, S. (1956). "A Note on Banquo". Shakespeare Quarterly. 7 (4). Folger Shakespeare Library: 371–376. doi:10.2307/2866356. eISSN 1538-3555. ISSN 0037-3222. JSTOR 2866356.
- Orgel, Stephen (2002). The Authentic Shakespeare. Routledge. ISBN 0-415-91213-X.
- Palmer, J. Foster (1886). "The Celt in Power: Tudor and Cromwell". Transactions of the Royal Historical Society. 3 (3). Royal Historical Society: 343–370. doi:10.2307/3677851. eISSN 1474-0648. ISSN 0080-4401. JSTOR 3677851. S2CID 162969426. Archived from the original on 26 July 2020.
- Pasternak, Boris (1959). I Remember: Sketch for an Autobiography. Translated by Magarshack, David; Harari, Manya. New York: Pantheon Books. OL 6271434M.
- Paul, Henry Neill (1950). The Royal Play of Macbeth: When, Why, and How It Was Written by Shakespeare. New York: Macmillan. hdl:2027/mdp.39015012064237. OCLC 307817. OL 6084940M.
- Perkins, William (1610). A Discovrse of The Damned Art of Witchcraft. Cambridge University Press. OL 19659796M. Archived from the original on 30 September 2022.
- Price, Eoin (2014). Edmondson, Paul; Prescott, Paul (eds.). "Macbeth in Original Pronunciation (Shakespeare's Globe) @ Sam Wanamaker Playhouse, 2014". Reviewing Shakespeare. Archived from the original on 29 June 2017.
- Rogers, H. L. (1965). "An English Tailor and Father Garnet's Straw". The Review of English Studies. 16 (61). Oxford University Press: 44–49. doi:10.1093/res/XVI.61.44. eISSN 1471-6968. ISSN 0034-6551. JSTOR 513543.
- Shaughnessy, Robert, ed. (2007). The Cambridge Companion to Shakespeare and Popular Culture. Cambridge Companions to Literature. Cambridge: Cambridge University Press. doi:10.1017/CCOL9780521844291. ISBN 978-1-139-00152-6 – via Cambridge Core.
  - Holland, Peter (2007). "Shakespeare abbreviated". In Shaughnessy, Robert (ed.). The Cambridge Companion to Shakespeare and Popular Culture. Cambridge Companions to Literature. Cambridge: Cambridge University Press. pp. 26–45. doi:10.1017/CCOL9780521844291.003. ISBN 978-1-139-00152-6 – via Cambridge Core.
- Smith, Joshua S. (2012). "Reading Between the Acts: Satire and the Interludes in The Knight of the Burning Pestle". Studies in Philology. 109 (4). The University of North Carolina Press: 474–495. doi:10.1353/sip.2012.0027. ISSN 1543-0383. S2CID 162251374.
- Spurgeon, Caroline F. E. (2010) [1935]. Shakespeare's Imagery and What it Tells Us. Cambridge: Cambridge University Press. doi:10.1017/CBO9780511620393. ISBN 978-0-511-62039-3 – via Cambridge Core.
- Stoll, E. E. (1943). "Source and Motive in Macbeth and Othello". The Review of English Studies. 19 (73). Oxford University Press: 25–32. doi:10.1093/res/os-XIX.73.25. eISSN 1471-6968. ISSN 0034-6551. JSTOR 510055.
- Straczynski, J. Michael (2006). Babylon 5. – The Scripts of J. Michael Straczynski. Vol. 6. Synthetic World.
- Tandon, Aditi (29 June 2004). "Exposing rural Punjabis to Shakespeare magic". The Tribune. Archived from the original on 30 September 2022.
- Taylor, Gary; Jowett, John (1993). Shakespeare Reshaped, 1606–1623. Oxford Shakespeare Studies. Oxford: Clarendon Press. ISBN 978-0-19-812256-2.
- Thomson, Peter (1992). Shakespeare's Theatre. Theatre Production Studies (2nd ed.). London: Routledge. ISBN 0-415-05148-7.
- Thrasher, Thomas (2002). Understanding Macbeth. Understanding Great Literature (1st ed.). San Diego: Lucent Books. ISBN 1-56006-998-8.
- "Theatre workshop for children". The Tribune. 12 June 2006. Archived from the original on 3 March 2016.
- Tritsch, Dina (April 1984). "The Curse of 'Macbeth'. Is there an evil spell on this ill-starred play?". Playbill. Archived from the original on 15 July 2011.
- Walter, Harriet (2002). Actors on Shakespeare: Macbeth. Faber and Faber. ISBN 978-0-571-21407-5.
- Wells, Stanley; Orlin, Lena Cowen, eds. (2003). Shakespeare: An Oxford Guide. Oxford: Oxford University Press. ISBN 978-0-19-924522-2.
  - Billington, Michael (2003). "Shakespeare and the Modern British Theatre". In Wells, Stanley; Orlin, Lena Cowen (eds.). Shakespeare: An Oxford Guide. Oxford: Oxford University Press. pp. 595–606. ISBN 978-0-19-924522-2.
  - Hawkes, Terence (2003). "Shakespeare's Afterlife: Introduction". In Wells, Stanley; Orlin, Lena Cowen (eds.). Shakespeare: An Oxford Guide. Oxford: Oxford University Press. pp. 571–581. ISBN 978-0-19-924522-2.
  - Tatspaugh, Patricia (2003). "Performance History: Shakespeare on the Stage 1660–2001". In Wells, Stanley; Orlin, Lena Cowen (eds.). Shakespeare: An Oxford Guide. Oxford: Oxford University Press. pp. 525–549. ISBN 978-0-19-924522-2.
- Wells, Stanley; Stanton, Sarah, eds. (2002). The Cambridge Companion to Shakespeare on Stage. Cambridge Companions to Literature. Cambridge: Cambridge University Press. doi:10.1017/CCOL0521792959. ISBN 978-0-511-99957-4. S2CID 152980428.
  - Gay, Penny (2002). "Women and Shakespearean performance". In Wells, Stanley; Stanton, Sarah (eds.). The Cambridge Companion to Shakespeare on Stage. Cambridge Companions to Literature. Cambridge: Cambridge University Press. pp. 155–173. doi:10.1017/CCOL0521792959.009. ISBN 978-0-511-99957-4 – via Cambridge Core.
  - Gillies, John; Minami, Ryuta; Li, Ruru; Trivedi, Poonam (2002). "Shakespeare on the stages of Asia". In Wells, Stanley; Stanton, Sarah (eds.). The Cambridge Companion to Shakespeare on Stage. Cambridge Companions to Literature. Cambridge: Cambridge University Press. pp. 259–283. doi:10.1017/CCOL0521792959.014. ISBN 978-0-511-99957-4 – via Cambridge Core.
  - Holland, Peter (2002). "Touring Shakespeare". In Wells, Stanley; Stanton, Sarah (eds.). The Cambridge Companion to Shakespeare on Stage. Cambridge Companions to Literature. Cambridge: Cambridge University Press. pp. 194–211. doi:10.1017/CCOL0521792959.011. ISBN 978-0-511-99957-4 – via Cambridge Core.
  - Marsden, Jean I. (2002). "Improving Shakespeare: from the Restoration to Garrick". In Wells, Stanley; Stanton, Sarah (eds.). The Cambridge Companion to Shakespeare on Stage. Cambridge Companions to Literature. Cambridge: Cambridge University Press. pp. 21–36. doi:10.1017/CCOL0521792959.002. ISBN 978-0-511-99957-4 – via Cambridge Core.
  - Moody, Jane (2002). "Romantic Shakespeare". In Wells, Stanley; Stanton, Sarah (eds.). The Cambridge Companion to Shakespeare on Stage. Cambridge Companions to Literature. Cambridge: Cambridge University Press. pp. 37–57. doi:10.1017/CCOL0521792959.003. ISBN 978-0-511-99957-4 – via Cambridge Core.
  - Morrison, Michael A. (2002). "Shakespeare in North America". In Wells, Stanley; Stanton, Sarah (eds.). The Cambridge Companion to Shakespeare on Stage. Cambridge Companions to Literature. Cambridge: Cambridge University Press. pp. 230–258. doi:10.1017/CCOL0521792959.013. ISBN 978-0-511-99957-4 – via Cambridge Core.
  - O'Connor, Marion (2002). "Reconstructive Shakespeare: reproducing Elizabethan and Jacobean stages". In Wells, Stanley; Stanton, Sarah (eds.). The Cambridge Companion to Shakespeare on Stage. Cambridge Companions to Literature. Cambridge: Cambridge University Press. pp. 76–97. doi:10.1017/CCOL0521792959.005. ISBN 978-0-511-99957-4 – via Cambridge Core.
  - Schoch, Richard W. (2002). "Pictorial Shakespeare". In Wells, Stanley; Stanton, Sarah (eds.). The Cambridge Companion to Shakespeare on Stage. Cambridge Companions to Literature. Cambridge: Cambridge University Press. pp. 58–75. doi:10.1017/CCOL0521792959.004. ISBN 978-0-511-99957-4 – via Cambridge Core.
  - Smallwood, Robert (2002). "Twentieth-century performance: the Stratford and London companies". In Wells, Stanley; Stanton, Sarah (eds.). The Cambridge Companion to Shakespeare on Stage. Cambridge Companions to Literature. Cambridge: Cambridge University Press. pp. 98–117. doi:10.1017/CCOL0521792959.006. ISBN 978-0-511-99957-4 – via Cambridge Core.
  - Taylor, Gary (2002). "Shakespeare plays on Renaissance stages". In Wells, Stanley; Stanton, Sarah (eds.). The Cambridge Companion to Shakespeare on Stage. Cambridge Companions to Literature. Cambridge: Cambridge University Press. pp. 1–20. doi:10.1017/CCOL0521792959.001. ISBN 978-0-511-99957-4 – via Cambridge Core.
  - Williams, Simon (2002). "The tragic actor and Shakespeare". In Wells, Stanley; Stanton, Sarah (eds.). The Cambridge Companion to Shakespeare on Stage. Cambridge Companions to Literature. Cambridge: Cambridge University Press. pp. 118–136. doi:10.1017/CCOL0521792959.007. ISBN 978-0-511-99957-4 – via Cambridge Core.
- Wells, Stanley; Taylor, Gary, eds. (2005). The Complete Works. The Oxford Shakespeare (2nd ed.). Oxford University Press. ISBN 978-0-19-926718-7.
- Whitted, Brent E. (2012). "Staging Exchange: Why The Knight of the Burning Pestle Flopped at Blackfriars in 1607". Early Theatre. 15 (2): 111–130. eISSN 2293-7609. ISSN 1206-9078. JSTOR 43499628.
- Wickham, Glynne (1969). Shakespeare's Dramatic Heritage: Collected Studies in Mediaeval, Tudor and Shakespearean Drama. Routledge. OL 22102542M.
- Wills, Garry (1996). Witches and Jesuits: Shakespeare's Macbeth. Oxford: Oxford University Press. ISBN 978-0-19-510290-1.
- Zagorin, Perez (1996). "The Historical Significance of Lying and Dissimulation". Social Research. 63 (3, Truth–Telling, Lying And Self–Deception). The New School: 863–912. ISSN 0037-783X. JSTOR 40972318.
