= Panhandle (film) =

1948 film by Lesley Selander

- Directed by: Lesley Selander
- Written by: Blake Edwards; John C. Champion
- Produced by: John C. Champion; Blake Edwards
- Starring: Rod Cameron; Cathy Downs; Reed Hadley; Anne Gwynne; Blake Edwards
- Cinematography: Harry Neumann
- Edited by: Richard Heermance
- Music by: Rex Dunn
- Production company: Champion-Edwards Productions
- Distributed by: Allied Artists
- Release date: February 22, 1948
- Running time: 85 minutes
- Country: United States
- Language: English
- Budget: $400,000

Panhandle is a 1948 Western film directed by Lesley Selander and starring Rod Cameron. This Western marked the writing and producing debuts of Blake Edwards and John C. Champion. Champion later reworked the story as the 1966 Audie Murphy Western The Texican. The team of Edwards, Champion, Selander, and star Cameron reteamed for the 1949 Western Stampede. Edwards later produced the police drama City Detective starring Cameron. The series was the first syndicated on television.

== Cast ==
- Rod Cameron as John Sands
- Cathy Downs as Jean 'Dusty' Stewart
- Reed Hadley as Matt Garson
- Anne Gwynne as June O'Carroll
- Blake Edwards as Floyd Schofield
- Dick Crockett as Elliott Crockett
- Rory Mallinson as Sheriff Jim
- Charles Judels as Botticelli the barber
- Alex Gerry as Raven McBride
- Francis McDonald as Crump
- J. Farrell MacDonald as Doc Cooper
- Henry Hall as Wells
- Stanley Andrews as Tyler
- Jeff York as Jack
- James Harrison as Harland
- Charles La Torre as Juan
- Frank Dae as Regan
- Billy Wayne as gambler

== Production ==
Producers John C. Champion and Blake Edwards raised $40,000 of the budget themselves, with Monogram providing $140,000.
