= List of Laramie episodes =

Laramie is an American Western television series that aired on NBC from 1959 to 1963. A Revue Studios production, the program originally starred John Smith as Slim Sherman, owner of the Sherman Ranch, along with his younger brother Andy, played by Robert L. Crawford, Jr.; Robert Fuller as Jess Harper, an immature, hot-headed drifter who shows up at the Sherman Ranch in the premiere episode; and Hoagy Carmichael as Jonesy, who keeps the homestead/stage stop running while Slim and Jess usually alternate starring roles during the show. Actress Spring Byington was later added to the cast.

== Episodes ==
Season	Episodes	Originally released	
Season	Episodes	First released	Last released
1	31	September 15, 1959	April 19, 1960
2	33	September 20, 1960	June 13, 1961
3	28	September 26, 1961	April 17, 1962
4	32	September 25, 1962	May 21, 1963

=== Season 1 (1959–60) ===
No. overall	No. in season	Title	Directed by	Written by	Original release date
1	1	"Stage Stop"	Herschel Daugherty	Robert Pirosh	September 15, 1959
2	2	"Glory Road"	Herschel Daugherty	Kathleen Hite	September 22, 1959
3	3	"Circle of Fire"	Virgil W. Vogel	Story by : John C. Champion & John Dunkel; Teleplay by : John Dunkel	September 29, 1959
4	4	"Fugitive Road"	Thomas Carr	Story by : Daniel B. Ullman; Teleplay by : Paul Savage	October 6, 1959
5	5	"The Star Trail"	Douglas Hayes	Douglas Hayes	October 13, 1959
6	6	"The Lawbreakers"	Lesley Selander	Jay Simms	October 20, 1959
7	7	"The Iron Captain"	Robert B. Sinclair	Story by : Robert Pirosh; Teleplay by : E. Jack Neuman	October 27, 1959
8	8	"General Delivery"	Richard H. Bartlett	Frank L. Moss	November 3, 1959
9	9	"The Run to Tumavaca"	Lesley Selander	Story by : John Falvo & Paul Savage; Teleplay by : Paul Savage	November 10, 1959
10	10	"The General Must Die"	Francis D. Lyon	Story by : John C. Champion; Teleplay by : John Dunkel	November 17, 1959
11	11	"Dark Verdict"	Herschel Daugherty	Donn Mullally & Lee Erwin	November 24, 1959
John MacLane (L. Q. Jones) is falsely accused of murdering a doctor. MacLane, who is a friend of Jess Harper's, is apprehended by a lynch mob led by James Hedrick (Warren Stevens). Hedrick is the son of eccentric Judge Matthew Hedrick (Thomas Mitchell), who stacks the trial against MacLane, who is quickly convicted and hanged. Judge Hedrick then serves as defense attorney for the lynch mob in a collective trial before the circuit judge. The mob is released on grounds that the homicide was without criminal intent, leniency is recommended by the jury, and the suspects must be retried under individual indictments, a technicality that outrages Jess Harper. Slim Sherman, who had tried to defend MacLane at the trial, cautions Jess against precipitate action, and the two come to temporary blows. Jess and Slim find that Hedrick, grieved by his own corruption, has committed suicide. Walter Coy plays the prosecutor, and Harry Dean Stanton portrays Vern Cowan, the doctor's real killer.
12	12	"Man of God"	Lesley Selander	Story by : John C. Champion; Teleplay by : Kathleen Hite	December 1, 1959
Father Elliott (James Gregory) hires Charlie Root (Bill Williams), to guide him to meet with the Sioux Chief Sitting Bull to foster a peace treaty on the lawless Wyoming frontier of the early 1870s. Series character Jess Harper fears for Father Elliott's safety when he learns that Charlie Root is wanted for murder and sets forth in pursuit of both men. Douglas Kennedy appears in this episode as a gunrunner and Tyler MacDuff as an Army lieutenant.
13	13	"Bare Knuckles"	Earl Bellamy	Donn Mullally & Lee Erwin	December 8, 1959
14	14	"The Lonesome Gun"	Alvin Ganzer	Story by : Daniel B. Ullman; Teleplay by : Arthur Browne Jr.	December 15, 1959
15	15	"Night of the Quiet Man"	Lesley Selander	Story by : John C. Champion; Teleplay by : Donn Mullally & Lee Erwin	December 22, 1959
16	16	"The Pass"	Lesley Selander	Donn Mullally & Lee Erwin	December 29, 1959
17	17	"Trail Drive"	Paul Landres	John C. Champion & Samuel A. Peeples	January 12, 1960
18	18	"Day of Vengeance"	Francis D. Lyon	Edward J. Lakso	January 19, 1960
19	19	"The Legend of Lily"	Lesley Selander	Story by : John C. Champion; Teleplay by : Kathleen Hite	January 26, 1960
20	20	"Death Wind"	Francis D. Lyon	Donn Mullally & Lee Erwin	February 2, 1960
21	21	"Company Man"	Don McDougall	Story by : Warren Douglas; Teleplay by : Warren Douglas & Daniel B. Ullman	February 9, 1960
22	22	"Rope of Steel"	Thomas Carr	Story by : Rod Peterson & Daniel B. Ullman; Teleplay by : Rod Peterson	February 16, 1960
23	23	"Duel at Alta Mesa"	Lesley Selander	Story by : Jerry Adelman & Jay Simms; Teleplay by : Jerry Adelman	February 23, 1960
24	24	"Street of Hate"	Herman Hoffman	Story by : Daniel B. Ullman; Teleplay by : Paul Savage	March 1, 1960
25	25	"Ride or Die"	Lesley Selander	Milton Geiger	March 8, 1960
26	26	"Hour After Dawn"	Francis D. Lyon	Story by : John Dunkel & Daniel B. Ullman; Teleplay by : John Dunkel	March 15, 1960
27	27	"The Protectors"	Lesley Selander	Story by : Oliver Drake & Al Martin; Teleplay by : Donn Mullally & Lee Erwin	March 22, 1960
28	28	"Saddle and Spur"	Thomas Carr	Sherman Vincent Harper	March 29, 1960
29	29	"Midnight Rebellion"	George Blair	Arthur E. Orloff	April 5, 1960
30	30	"Cemetery Road"	Thomas Carr	Buckley Angell	April 12, 1960
31	31	"Men of Defiance"	Lesley Selander	John C. Champion	April 19, 1960

=== Season 2 (1960–61) ===
No. overall	No. in season	Title	Directed by	Written by	Original release date
32	1	"Queen of Diamonds"	Lesley Selander	Story by : Dan Ullman; Teleplay by : Jerry Adelman	September 20, 1960
Jim Dark (Claude Akins) foils a robbery by the Reeves brothers, one of whom was killed, but his right hand was severely injured, and he can no longer handle a gun. June Brown (Julie London) avoids her husband for his own protection when the outlaw brothers pursue them. Ultimately, the gang is captured, and the Darks are reconciled and leave Laramie by stagecoach. This episode has comic scenes of Slim Sherman and Jess Harper with repeated household chores since Slim's brother, Andy, had left the ranch for boarding school.
33	2	"The Track of the Jackal"	Francis D. Lyon	Story by : Dan Ullman; Teleplay by : Paul Savage	September 27, 1960
34	3	"Three Rode West"	Lesley Selander	Jerry Adelman	October 4, 1960
Vera Miles appears as Annie Andrews, a woman seeking a husband. When the outlaw Frank Skinner, played by Myron Healey, admits that he will not marry her, Annie set her sights on Slim Sherman, who is not interested in marriage either but is looking for Skinner, for whom he had earlier ridden shotgun on the stagecoach. Skinner then robbed the stage of its $10,000 shipment and shot to death Jack Adams, played by Ross Elliott, the manager of the stage line in Rockland City. Slim had never met Adams, who had been a friend of his late father, Matt Sherman. Skinner tries to use Annie to lure Sherman into an ambush. The episode also features Chris Alcaide and Denver Pyle.
35	4	"Ride the Wild Wind"	Francis D. Lyon	Story by : John C. Champion; Teleplay by : Rod Peterson	October 11, 1960
Ernest Borgnine guest stars as Boone Caudie, a "compassionate" outlaw who is courting a kind widow, Hannah Moore, played by Vivi Janiss (the second of the five wives of Bob Cummings), whom he plans to marry after one more bank holdup, this time in Casper. The outlaws find Andy Sherman on the trail riding a wild horse which they had stolen a year earlier from the Sherman ranch. The horse had just been returned after its rider, a member of the Caudie gang, was shot to death following a bank robbery in Laramie. Slim Sherman tracks down the gang in search of his brother. He finds a painting of U.S. President Ulysses S. Grant on Hannah's mantle. The painting was stolen by Caudie in the Laramie bank robbery and presented as a surprise "gift" to Hannah. The outlaws, including Caudie, are all killed in the foiled bank robbery in Casper.
36	5	"Ride Into Darkness"	Lesley Selander	Jerry Adelman	October 18, 1960
37	6	"The Long Riders"	Lesley Selander	Story by : John C. Champion; Teleplay by : John Dunkel	October 25, 1960
Slim Sherman and Jess Harper, while rounding up mustangs for extra money, save from an Indian attack the life of Luke Gregg (Dan Duryea). Slim invites Luke to work temporarily at the ranch, but Jess believes something is awry when Luke mentions Slim's past association with a vigilante group in Adobe Wells, Kansas. Luke is tied to Ed McKeever (John Anderson), a gunman who has been targeting the former vigilantes one by one. McKeever and his gang try to ambush Slim, who comes to the aid of Sheriff Mort Corey, another former Adobe Wells vigilante shot and wounded by McKeever. Ultimately, McKeever shoots Luke to death as Luke warns Slim of danger.
38	7	"The Dark Trail"	Francis D. Lyon	Story by : Dan Ullman; Teleplay by : Milton Geiger	November 1, 1960
39	8	".45 Calibre"	Lesley Selander	Donn Mullally & Lee Erwin	November 15, 1960
40	9	"License to Kill"	Lesley Selander	Donn Mullally & Lee Erwin	November 22, 1960
R. G. Armstrong plays Sam Jarrad, a former bounty hunter and a sheriff in Colorado, who comes to Laramie with a warrant for Jess Harper, who is accused of murdering a powerful rancher named Blake Wilkie. Slim Sherman is deputized to accompany Jarrad and Jess to Colorado. Denny Miller, later cast on Wagon Train as a regular, Duke Shannon, along with Robert Fuller as Cooper Smith, appears in this episode as Wilkie's son who has framed Jess for Blake Wilkie's death.
41	10	"Drifter's Gold"	Francis D. Lyon	Story by : Norman Jacob; Teleplay by : Rod Peterson	November 29, 1960
Rod Cameron plays Tom Bedloe, an outlaw who has started the rumor of a nearby gold strike. When Slim Sherman comes to Laramie to buy supplies, he finds the town nearly deserted and must pretend to be an outlaw to survive. Meanwhile, Bedloe is looking for Marcie Benson, the daughter he has never seen, played by Judi Meredith. Gregory Walcott plays Duke, Bedloe's partner in crime.
42	11	"No Second Chance"	Earl Bellamy	Frank Chase	December 6, 1960
43	12	"Duel at Parkinson Town"	Maury Geraghty	Calvin J. Clements	December 13, 1960
Henry Hull guest starred as Ben Parkison, an embittered rancher who challenges Slim Sherman to a duel after Parkison's younger son accidentally kills himself on Sherman ranch land while stealing a calf. Ron Harper portrays the other Parkison son, Tom. The episode reveals that the Parksions and Shermans had many past disagreements that had resulted in a feud, but Slim had thought that the two families, now reduced in number, could live in peace.
44	13	"A Sound of Bells"	Joseph Kane	Fred Freiberger	December 27, 1960
45	14	"The Passing of Kuba Smith"	Lesley Selander	David Lang	January 3, 1961
46	15	"Man from Kansas"	Joseph Kane	Story by : Dan Ullman; Teleplay by : Paul Savage	January 10, 1961
47	16	"Killer Without Cause"	Lesley Selander	Donn Mullally & Lee Erwin	January 24, 1961
48	17	"Stolen Tribute"	Lesley Selander	Story by : John C. Champion; Teleplay by : Donn Mullally & Lee Erwin	January 31, 1961
Jess Harper is forced at gunpoint to journey into the Utah Territory by a released prisoner, Clint Wade, played by Jan Merlin, in search of $80,000 in stolen gold coins. Jess had killed and buried Wade's brother five years earlier at an abandoned Spanish mission in the desert but without finding the whereabouts of the buried gold. Soon Wade's former cellmate, Deke Beldon, played by Dennis Patrick, joins them with plans to take the money for himself. At the outpost, the three come upon crusty recluse Tully Casper, played by Edgar Buchanan, who also has his eyes on the gold. Ultimately, Jess forces Casper to turn over the gold to authorities after Casper has spent some $200 in a saloon.
49	18	"The Lost Dutchman"	Tay Garnett	Jerry Adelman	February 14, 1961
Slim Sherman and Jess Harper arrive in Jackson City to purchase cattle from a state senator, George Lake, played by Robert Emhardt. Lake, however, reneges on the deal and is then murdered. Circumstantial evidence points to Slim as the culprit. When Jess sets forth to clear his friend, he comes across several persons seeking to find a cavalry spur that supposedly contains a map to the fabled Lost Dutchman's Gold Mine in Arizona. Lake was killed for the map, and Jess races to find the decisive spur before Slim can be tried, convicted, and hanged. Karen Steele appears as Linda Lake.
50	19	"Cactus Lady"	Maury Geraghty	Maury Geraghty	February 21, 1961
51	20	"Riders of the Night"	Lesley Selander	Story by : John C. Champion; Teleplay by : Milton Geiger & Rod Peterson	March 7, 1961
52	21	"Mark of the Manhunters"	Joseph Kane	Story by : John C. Champion; Teleplay by : Paul Savage	March 14, 1961
53	22	"Rimrock"	Herman Hoffman	Story by : John C. Champion; Teleplay by : Paul Savage	March 21, 1961
54	23	"Run of the Hunted"	James P. Yarbrough	Donn Mullally & Lee Erwin	April 4, 1961
55	24	"Two for the Gallows"	Lesley Selander	Story by : John C. Champion; Teleplay by : Dan Ullman	April 11, 1961
56	25	"The Debt"	Joseph Kane	David Lang	April 18, 1961
57	26	"Killers' Odds"	Lesley Selander	Jerry Adelman	April 25, 1961
Jess Harper comes upon Fred Powers, a stranger with a price on his head, played by John Lupton, formerly of the Broken Arrow series. Slim Sherman offers Fred employment on the ranch though Fred is pursued by bounty hunters portrayed by Lee Van Cleef and Russell Johnson. The charge against Fred is fraudulent because he had killed in self-defense. Fred begins to court Sue Fenton, played by Patricia Michon, in whom Slim also has a romantic interest. Ultimately, Slim, Jess, and Fred must rescue Sue and her family from the gunslingers. As the episode ends, Fred, not Slim, gets the girl, and the two head by covered wagon to California, where Sue had inherited unseen property.
58	27	"Bitter Glory"	Herschel Daugherty	Edward J. Lakso	May 2, 1961
59	28	"The Tumbleweed Wagon"	Lesley Selander	Raphael Hayes	May 9, 1961
60	29	"Trigger Point"	Lesley Selander	Arthur Browne Jr.	May 16, 1961
61	30	"Badge of the Outsider"	Joseph Kane	Story by : John C. Champion; Teleplay by : Kathleen Hite	May 23, 1961
62	31	"Men in Shadows"	Lesley Selander	Story by : John C. Champion; Teleplay by : Calvin Clements	May 30, 1961
63	32	"Strange Company"	Harold Schuster	Story by : John C. Champion; Teleplay by : Rod Peterson	June 6, 1961
64	33	"Widow in White"	Joseph Kane	Rod Peterson	June 13, 1961

=== Season 3 (1961–62) ===
No. overall	No. in season	Title	Directed by	Written by	Original release date
65	1	"Dragon at the Door"	James P. Yarbrough	Rod Peterson	September 26, 1961
66	2	"Ladies' Day"	Lesley Selander	Story by : Dan Ullman; Teleplay by : Rod Peterson	October 3, 1961
67	3	"Siege at Jubilee"	Lesley Selander	Story by : John C. Champion; Teleplay by : Rod Peterson	October 10, 1961
68	4	"The Mountain Men"	Joseph Kane	Story by : Dan Ullman; Teleplay by : Donn Mullally & Lee Erwin	October 17, 1961
At the Sherman Relay Station, Ben Sanford, played by Dan Duryea, and one of the original settlers in the Laramie area, and his two sons intend to remove a prisoner, Joe Vance, who is being transported to Fort Leavenworth after conviction of the manslaughter of a third Sanford son. The Sanfords plan to lynch the prisoner to get the justice that they believe the court denied them. At the time the Sanfords arrive at the relay station, Slim Sherman and Jess Harper are painting the roof, and Daisy Cooper and Mike Williams have gone into town for supplies. Ultimately, the younger of the Sanford sons, John, played in his acting debut by Alex Cord, a long-time friend of Robert Fuller's, fires a warning shot to alert the stagecoach carrying Vance. The older belligerent son, portrayed by Jason Evers, falls in a gunfight with Jess, but Vance proceeds to serve his sentence at Leavenworth.
69	5	"The Fatal Step"	Joseph Kane	Story by : John C. Champion; Teleplay by : Paul Savage	October 24, 1961
Gary Clarke appeared as Tad Kimball, a young friend of Jess Harper. Kimball, however, joins a partner, portrayed by Dennis Patrick, in the sabotage and robbery of a stage in which Jess is riding shotgun. He regrets taking part in the crime and tries belatedly to make amends.
70	6	"The Last Journey"	Joseph Kane	Story by : Edward J. Lakso; Teleplay by : Rod Peterson	October 31, 1961
71	7	"Deadly is the Night"	Lesley Selander	Jerry Adelman & John C. Champion	November 7, 1961
Jess Harper stops at the former stagecoach outpost of Ma Tolliver (Olive Carey) to rest his lame horse. Suddenly Matt Dyer, an outlaw played by Lloyd Nolan, arrives with his gang and takes as hostage Jess, Ma, and her granddaughter, Sue (Marlene Willis). Dyer proceeds to humiliate the hostages, and when a posse arrives, he tries to use Ma and Sue to prevent the storming of the house. However, the posse forces his hand, and the outlaws flee, but Jess prevents Dyer from running away. Harry Lauter appears as Rafe Andrews.
72	8	"The Accusers"	Ted Post	Story by : Dan Ullman; Teleplay by : Albert Aley	November 14, 1961
Housekeeper Daisy Cooper identifies Slim Sherman's stage line boss, Allen Winter, played by Charles Drake, as having left a hotel room right after a saloon girl, Carla Morton, portrayed by Joanne Linville, is murdered there. At first, few believe Daisy because Winter is a respected man in Laramie. Carla had pressured Winter to leave his wife and marry her. When Daisy searches for further proof of Winter's guilt, Winter resorts to sabotage of Daisy's carriage and stakes out the Sherman ranch house, posing as an Indian, while Slim is away on an overnight assignment authorized by Winter. Slim suddenly becomes convinced of Daisy's story and rides to her rescue.
73	9	"Wolf Cub"	Lesley Selander	Ron Bishop & Wells Root	November 21, 1961
74	10	"Handful of Fire"	Joseph Kane	Story by : Rod Peterson; Teleplay by : Raphael Hayes	December 5, 1961
A Colonel John Barrington, played by George Macready, and presumably modeled on John Chivington of the Sand Creek massacre in Colorado in 1864, escapes while facing a court martial at Fort Laramie for his role in the later Wounded Knee Massacre of 1890 in South Dakota. The episode reveals that Slim Sherman was present at Wounded Knee and hence testified against Barrington, but that time sequence is inconsistent with the other episodes of Laramie, set in the 1870s. Barrington's daughter, Madge takes Slim hostage. She has documents in her possession which she contends justify Barrington's harsh Indian policies. Slim escapes but must negotiate with the Sioux to avoid massacre.
75	11	"The Killer Legend"	Hollingsworth Morse	Story by : Robert Hamner & Rod Peterson; Teleplay by : Rod Peterson	December 12, 1961
76	12	"The Jailbreakers"	Joseph Kane	Story by : John C. Champion; Teleplay by : Albert Aley	December 19, 1961
77	13	"The Lawless Seven"	Lesley Selander	Dan Ullman	December 26, 1961
78	14	"The Perfect Gift"	Lesley Selander	Tom Seller	January 2, 1962
79	15	"The Barefoot Kid"	Joseph Kane	Dick Nelson	January 9, 1962
80	16	"Shadows in the Dust"	Joseph Kane	Lowell Barrington	January 16, 1962
81	17	"The Runaway"	Lesley Selander	Meyer Dolinsky	January 23, 1962
82	18	"The Confederate Express"	Lesley Selander	Story by : Paul Savage; Teleplay by : John C. Champion	January 30, 1962
Outlaw Matt Grundy, played by John Larch, arrives in Laramie with a scheme to win back the affection of his wife, Martha, portrayed by Peggy Webber, and their young daughter, Tina. As a favor to their neighbor, Martha, Slim Sherman and Jess Harper defend Grundy, who is pursued by the Kerrigan brothers, played by Harry Dean Stanton, Steve Brodie, and James Beck. Grundy fools Slim and Jess into thinking that he must reach Laramie to deposit a bank draft, but he really intends to rob the bank. Grundy had saved Jess from an accident while he was repairing the wheel of a stagecoach but then injects him with a dangerous chemical to keep him from talking after Jess learns that Grundy is indeed an outlaw. Grundy shoots Slim in the arm. As he died, Grundy asked Slim to make sure that Martha received the reward money on his head.
83	19	"The High Country"	Unknown	Story by : Dan Ullman; Teleplay by : Donn Mullally & Lee Erwin & Paul Savage	February 6, 1962
84	20	"A Grave for Cully Brown"	Joseph Kane	Story by : Edward J. Lakso; Teleplay by : Albert Aley	February 13, 1962
85	21	"The Runt"	Lesley Selander	Story by : John C. Champion & Leon Schotter; Teleplay by : Raphael Hayes & Rod Peterson	February 20, 1962
86	22	"The Dynamiters"	Lesley Selander	Story by : Dan Ullman; Teleplay by : Ron Bishop	March 6, 1962
87	23	"Day of the Savage"	Joseph Kane	Story by : John C. Champion; Teleplay by : Rod Peterson	March 13, 1962
88	24	"Justice in a Hurry"	Joseph Kane	Herman Epstein	March 20, 1962
89	25	"The Replacement"	Lesley Selander	Richard Newman	March 27, 1962
90	26	"The Turn of the Wheel"	Lesley Selander	Story by : Arthur Brown Jr. Teleplay by : Rod Peterson and Paul Savage	April 3, 1962
91	27	"Trial by Fire"	Joe Kane	George Slavin	April 10, 1962
92	28	"Fall into Darkness"	Joe Kane	Rod Peterson	April 17, 1962

=== Season 4 (1962–63) ===
No. overall	No. in season	Title	Directed by	Written by	Original release date
93	1	"Among the Missing"	Joseph Kane	Rod Peterson	September 25, 1962
94	2	"War Hero"	Lesley Selander	Sam Ross	October 2, 1962
95	3	"The Fortune Hunter"	Joseph Kane	Story by : John C. Champion; Teleplay by : Buckley Angell	October 9, 1962
Ray Danton plays Vince Jackson, a suave but nefarious suitor for a young woman, Kitty McAllen, played by Carolyn Craig, whom he plans to marry in order to extort money from her wealthy father, Fred McAllen, portrayed by Parley Baer. However, Slim Sherman has his own interest in Kitty who is using Vince's alleged affections to make Slim jealous. Ultimately, Kitty leaves Laramie to attend college.
96	4	"Shadow of the Past"	Herman Hoffman	Story by : David Lang; Teleplay by : David Lang & Dan Ullman	October 16, 1962
97	5	"The Long Road Back"	Lesley Selander	Story by : John C. Champion; Teleplay by : Albert Aley	October 23, 1962
98	6	"Lost Allegiance"	Joseph Kane	Story by : John C. Champion; Teleplay by : Dick Nelson	October 30, 1962
99	7	"The Sunday School"	Lesley Selander	Story by : John C. Champion; Teleplay by : Ron Bishop	November 13, 1962
100	8	"Double Eagles"	Joseph Kane	Richard Newman	November 20, 1962
101	9	"Beyond Justice"	Lesley Selander	William Blinn & Michael Gleason	November 27, 1962
102	10	"Bad Blood"	Joseph Kane	Fred Freiberger & Herman Miller	December 4, 1962
103	11	"Time of the Traitor"	Joseph Kane	Story by : John C. Champion; Teleplay by : Paul Savage	December 11, 1962
104	12	"Gun Duel"	Thomas Carr	Story by : John C. Champion; Teleplay by : Albert Aley	December 25, 1962
Jess Harper is the weekend deputy while Sheriff Mort Corey is away on business. Mort's newly married nephew, Johnny Hartley, played by Ben Cooper, wants to become a deputy too but finds he is unsuited for the work only after nearly getting killed by gunshot from two bank robbers, played by DeForest Kelley and Richard Devon. Carole Wells, formerly of National Velvet, portrays Carol Hartley, Johnny's wife. Jack Elam appears in this episode as the comical Pastor Hawks, dressed in black, who is an unconventional jail "guest". Gail Kobe, formerly of CBS's Trackdown, plays Lottie Harris, a saloon girl who had hoped to marry one of the bank robbers and then head to California. Jess advises Lottie to stop gazing out the window at the dusty Laramie street and to look instead in the mirror to overcome her own weaknesses.
105	13	"Naked Steel"	Harmon Jones	Story by : John C. Champion; Teleplay by : Donald S. Sanford	January 1, 1963
106	14	"Vengeance"	Joseph Kane	Story by : Ray Buffum; Teleplay by : Ray Buffum & Rod Peterson	January 8, 1963
107	15	"Protective Custody"	Joseph Kane	Story by : John C. Champion & Dan Ullman; Teleplay by : Paul Savage	January 15, 1963
108	16	"The Betrayers"	Jesse Hibbs	Story by : John C. Champion; Teleplay by : Albert Aley	January 22, 1963
109	17	"The Wedding Party"	Jesse Hibbs	Story by : John C. Champion; Teleplay by : Albert Aley & John C. Champion	January 29, 1963
110	18	"No Place to Run"	Lesley Selander	David Lang	February 5, 1963
Don Durant played the role of Gandy Ross, a likeable safecracker trying to go straight. Ellen Burstyn plays Ross's girlfriend, Amy, and Arch Johnson is cast as the outlaw Sam Wellman, who forces Ross to open the safe in the bank at fictitious Granite City. Tom Skerritt plays the role of Price. Jess Harper does his best to rescue his friend Ross from the clutches of the outlaws.
111	19	"The Fugitives"	Joseph Kane	Story by : John C. Champion; Teleplay by : Donald S. Sanford	February 12, 1963
112	20	"The Dispossessed"	Jesse Hibbs	Buckley Angell	February 19, 1963
113	21	"The Renegade Brand"	Lesley Selander	Paul Savage	February 26, 1963
114	22	"The Violent Ones"	Lesley Selander	Story by : Dan Ullman; Teleplay by : Paul Savage	March 5, 1963
115	23	"The Unvanquished"	Hollingsworth Morse	Story by : Joyce Perry; Teleplay by : Dick Nelson	March 12, 1963
116	24	"The Sometime Gambler"	Lesley Selander	Story by : John Meredyth Lucas; Teleplay by : John Meredyth Lucas & Rod Peterson	March 19, 1963
117	25	"Edge of Evil"	Hollingsworth Morse	Story by : John Rosser & Dan Ullman; Teleplay by : Ron Bishop	April 2, 1963
118	26	"Broken Honor"	William Witney	Story by : Joyce Perry; Teleplay by : Robert Vincent Wright	April 9, 1963
Rod Cameron and Peggy McCay portray Roy and Martha Halloran, a farm couple who stumbles upon $30,000 in money found inside a strong box on their property. The loot had been seized in a stagecoach heist and hidden away for later retrieval. Roy, who is reliant on a wheelchair, insists on keeping the money until Jess Harper arrives amid grave danger to all of their lives from the bandits searching about for the missing money. One of the bandits is played by Don "Red" Barry, best remembered from the 1940 film Adventures of Red Ryder.
119	27	"The Last Battleground"	Lesley Selander	Ron Bishop	April 16, 1963
120	28	"The Stranger"	Jesse Hibbs	Donald S. Sanford	April 23, 1963
121	29	"The Marshals"	William Witney	Story by : John C. Champion; Teleplay by : Albert Aley	April 30, 1963
122	30	"Badge of Glory"	Joseph Kane	George F. Slavin	May 7, 1963
123	31	"Trapped"	Joseph Kane	Story by : Joyce Perry; Teleplay by : Rod Peterson	May 14, 1963
Slim Sherman finds an injured kidnap victim in the woods, portrayed by Mona Freeman. Dennis Holmes, as Mike Williams, rides away to seek help, but the kidnappers reclaim the hostage. Slim pursues the kidnappers but is mistaken as a third kidnapper by the girl's father, played by Barton MacLane. Sands plays the girl's boyfriend, who had been ordered by her father to cease seeing her. Guest stars include Tommy Sands, Claude Akins, and Jim Davis.
124	32	"The Road to Helena"	Herman Hoffman	Story by : Dan Ullman; Teleplay by : John McGreevey	May 21, 1963
Slim Sherman, while in Cody, Wyoming, is hired by David Franklin, played by Henry Hull, and his barmaid daughter, Ruth, portrayed by Maggie Pierce, to guide the pair to Helena, Montana, so that Franklin can return money that he had previously stolen. John M. Pickard, who appeared seven times on Laramie, guest stars in the final episode as Bradford.
