= Ron Lesser =

American artist (born 1941)

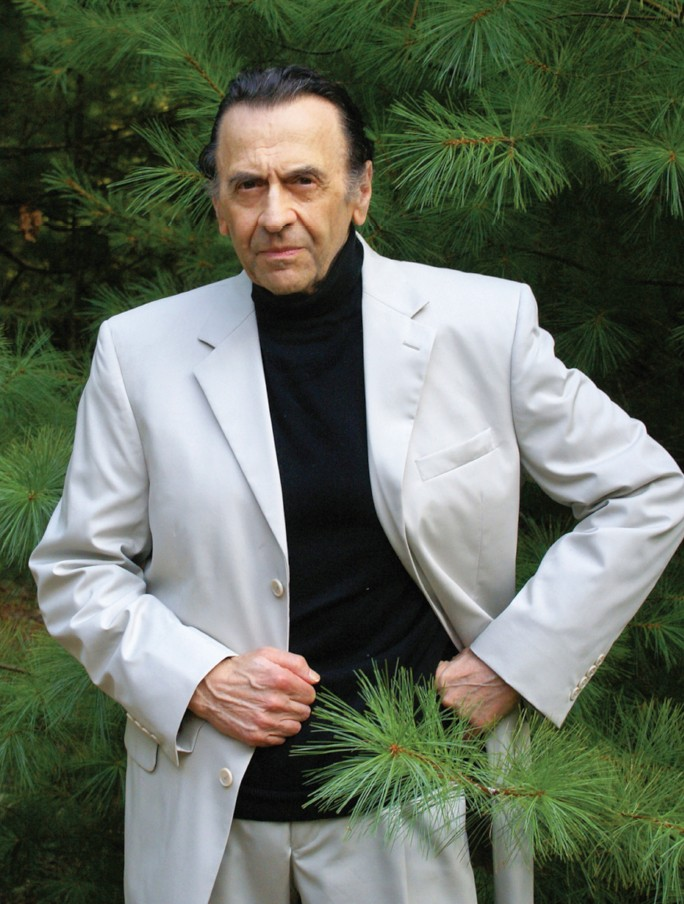
- Ron Lesser by David Lesser in New York
- Born: 1941 (age 84–85); Manhattan, New York
- Notable work: Ryan's Daughter; High Plains Drifter; Carter Brown Mysteries; Zardoz

Ron Lesser (born 1941) is a Manhattan-born illustrator and painter that specializes in paperback covers, comic books, magazines, and film posters. From 1976 to 1991, Ron was among the premier illustrators, contributing painted book covers for publishers like Doubleday, Dell, Avon, Bantam, Fawcett, and Pyramid.

In 2002, Lesser began a four-year commission as one of the top military artists in America, creating artwork for Civil War Publications and exhibitions at the Gettysburg National Museum, National Civil War Museum, and the Gettysburg Frame Shop & Gallery. In recognition of his work, Lesser has received recognition from The Society of Illustrators and the Art Directors Club of New York.

== Early life and education ==
Born in Manhattan in 1941, Lesser was an only child. When he was around age 9 he discovered comic book drawings and gravitated to mid-20th-century cartoonists like Alex Raymond (Flash Gordon), Milton Caniff (Terry and the Pirates), and Al Capp (Li'l Abner). Around the age of 12, Lesser began drawing comics and later graduated from New York City's High School of Music & Art before studying one semester at the Pratt Institute in New York in 1958. Shortly after leaving Pratt, Lesser enrolled in the Art Students League of New York (ASL) and solely studied for four years under Frank J. Reilly, a teacher of drawing, painting, and illustration. There, Reilly taught the tradition and techniques of the French Fine Arts Academy of the 19th and 20th centuries while also offering several publisher-sponsored contests for students to join. Two Western paintings Lesser did while he was a Riley student became his first paperback covers. One was used on one side of the Ace Books Double Lead In His Fists (D-276 WE, 1958) by Tom West. The second, a Riley contest winner, was used for the Berkley Books paperback War Country (G433, 1960) by William O. Turner.

== Career ==
Shortly after departing the Art Students League of New York, Lesser joined the Fredman-Chaite Studios. The renowned agency would commission advertising representatives to secure illustration assignments for artists. This editorial work consisted of illustrating magazines, newspapers, paperback covers, and ad art. Due to the rise of photography, the studio was driven out of business.

Lesser was a prolific illustrator between 1976 through 1991. He painted several thousand paperback covers while simultaneously creating movie art and advertising illustrations. In the 1980s, Lesser made several hundred covers for Harlequin Enterprises' romance paperbacks. In the 2000s, Lesser created paintings inspired by the American Civil War. In the 2010s, Lesser created paintings celebrating polo horses and their riders, pop art from his successful Marilyn Monroe series, and became affiliated with a major celebrity and sports marketing and branding company to illustrate athletes like Derek Jeter, Mickey Mantle, and Muhammad Ali.

== Film ==
=== 1960s ===
One of Lesser's earliest involvements with the film industry was a movie poster, poster art, and b&w press kit for the 1964 film The Americanization of Emily starring James Garner, Julie Andrews, and James Coburn. Two years later, Lesser painted the theatrical poster for the Mauro Bolognini and Mario Monicelli comedy Queens, starring Raquel Welch.

Lesser was involved with preliminary artwork for the 1967 United Artists theatrical film The Way West. Although the painting was never used for the film, Lesser was still paid for his work. Also in 1967, Lesser painted movie posters for two comedy films, the Italian Spoof film O.K. Connery, released in the U.S. as Operation Kid Brother, and Three Bites of the Apple, a 1967 American romantic comedy.

In 1968, the Len Deighton novel Only When I Larf was adapted into a Paramount Global film of the same name with Lesser's painted theatrical poster. Lesser followed a year later with a painted theatrical film poster for the Paramount Pictures distributed film Paint Your Wagon.

=== 1970s ===
While at his agent's office, Lesser saw artists making sketches for the 1970 Metro-Goldwyn-Mayer film Ryan's Daughter. He submitted two paintings to Metro-Goldwyn-Mayer advertising the film and the studio purchased both. That same year, Lesser created a print ad art for the Columbia Pictures film There's a Girl in My Soup starring Peter Sellers and Goldie Hawn.

In 1972, Lesser painted movie posters for the Clint Eastwood film Joe Kidd for Eastwood's Malpaso Productions. and the The Revengers, distributed by National General Pictures.

1973 was a productive year for Lesser's film artwork. He painted two iconic western movie posters, the iconic Clint Eastwood film High Plains Drifter in 1973. and the Metro-Goldwyn-Mayer 1973 film Pat Garrett and Billy the Kid. Also the same year, Lesser painted movie posters for the crime film Lady Ice starring Donald Sutherland. and Massacre in Rome, an adaptation of the 1967 Robert Katz novel Death in Rome.

Lesser painted the theatrical poster for the 1974 20th Century Fox (now 20th Century Studios) film Zardoz. The painting was awarded the best movie art of the year from the Art Directors Club of New York. That same year, Lesser painted the poster for the French film L'amour a la bouche, released in America as Mannequin.

== Comics ==
In 2012, Ron Lesser painted the pulp hero Spider for the Dynamite Entertainment covers of The Spider #1, #2, #3 (May–July 2012).

Lesser's 2014 painting Sin City: A Dame to Kill For features actress Rosario Dawson as the character Grail. The painting was featured in the Dark Horse Comics limited series A Dame to Kill For.

Lesser paired with Titan Publishing Group for the first issue of the Max Allan Collins title Quarry's War (Nov. 2017). The artist was featured in the story "The Beginnings of Quarry" alongside iconic artist Robert McGinnis.

The Exclusive Jetpack/Forbidden Planet variant for the Dynamite Entertainment title Bettie Page (Nov. 2018), based on the celebrity Bettie Page, was painted by Lesser.

The first issue of the Dynamite Entertainment title Charlie's Angels vs The Bionic Woman (July 2019) features Ron Lesser's painted cover on Variant C and Variant E.

After his submission of artwork used on the Charlie's Angels vs The Bionic Woman comic, the individual manager of Dynamite Entertainment reached out to Lesser for an art piece for their Red Sonja comic issues. In The Art of Ron Lesser Vol. 2: Dangerous Dames and Cover Dolls, edited by Robert Deis, Bill Cunningham and David Zimmer, Lesser explained his limited involvement in the series:

"I made a painting of her with a big axe and he liked it, but it didn't end up being used. I liked it, too, though and it sold pretty well quickly through an online art site. Since then, I've done several other Red Sonja paintings."

== Books ==
In 1959, as Lesser was honing his craft, he was hired by Midwood Books to paint the first published novel by the acclaimed crime-fiction author Donald E. Westlake, the creator and writer of the iconic heist-fiction series Parker (Stark novels character). That same year, Lesser painted the cover for iconic crime-fiction and mystery writer John D. MacDonald's paperback The Crossroads, published by Fawcett Publications imprint Crest Books. Lesser used models Steve Holland (actor), Lisa Karan, and his wife, Claudia Lesser.

1950s
| Year | Title | Publisher | Number |
|---|---|---|---|
| 1959 | All My Lovers | Midwood | 15 |
| 1959 | Crossroads, The | Crest | S400 |
| 1959 | Lead in His Fists | Ace | D-276 |
| 1959 | Long Dream, The | Ace | K-100 |

In the 1960s, Lesser was hired by publishers like Berkley Books, Lancer Books, Avon (publisher), Midwood Books, Dell Publishing, Pyramid Books (now Jove Books), and Fawcett Publications to paint paperback covers.

The 1960s aligned Lesser with three best-selling fiction series titles, Shell Scott by Richard Prather, Johnny Liddell by Frank Kane, and Travis McGee by John D. MacDonald. Additionally, Lesser was commissioned by Lancer Books to paint two covers for the Steve Bentley series, authored by Watergate scandal conspirator E. Howard Hunt, a former officer in the Central Intelligence Agency (CIA) who experienced success as a mystery and spy-fiction author from the 1940s through the 1990s. Lesser also painted for the popular Carter Brown mysteries.

1960s
| Year | Title | Publisher | Number |
|---|---|---|---|
| 1960 | Concerning a Woman of Sin | Crest | S410 |
| 1960 | So Willing | Midwood | 48 |
| 1960 | War Country | Berkley | G433 |
| 1960 | Deadly Doll (Peter Chambers) | Zenith | ZB-19 |
| 1961 | Name is Malone, The | Pyramid | G-671 |
| 1961 | Seven Slaughters (Shell Scott) | Fawcett | T2613 |
| 1962 | Bride of Fu Manchu (Fu Manchu) | Pyramid | F-761 |
| 1962 | Diary of Love | Pyramid | F793 |
| 1962 | Crazy to Kill | MacFadden | 50-363 |
| 1962 | Crime of Their Life (Johnny Liddell) | Dell | 1557 |
| 1962 | Curtains for a Lover (Steve Bentley) | Lancer | 71-311 |
| 1962 | Into the Forest | MacFadden | 60-111 |
| 1962 | Make Me an Offer | Berkley | Y635 |
| 1962 | Mask of Fu Manchu (Fu Manchu) | Pyramid | F-740 |
| 1962 | My Body (Steve Bentley) | Lancer | 70-010 |
| 1962 | Name is Jordan (Scott Jordan) | Pyramid | F-720 |
| 1962 | Never Love a Call Girl | Midwood | F205 |
| 1963 | Bats Fly at Dusk (Cool & Lam) | Dell | 0476 |
| 1963 | City Limits (Mike Macauley) | Pyramid | F-887 |
| 1963 | Diana | Lancer | 72-667 |
| 1963 | Fifth Wife | Pyramid | R-942 |
| 1963 | Hearse Class Male (Johnny Liddell) | Dell | 3528 |
| 1963 | Her Own Kind | New Chariot Library | 6C-635 |
| 1963 | It's Different Abroad | Avon | G1279 |
| 1963 | Johnny Come Lately (Johnny Liddell) | Dell | 4246 |
| 1963 | Never Give a Millionaire an Even Break (Peter Chambers) | Lancer | 70-048 |
| 1963 | Rind-a-Ding-Ding (Johnny Liddell) | Dell | 1963 |
| 1963 | Strange Friends | Pyramid | |
| 1963 | Wary Transgressor, The | Panther | |
| 1964 | Barely Seen (Johnny Liddell) | Dell | D458 |
| 1964 | Ben Gates is Hot <Ben Gates) | Dell | 0534 |
| 1964 | Bitter Conquest | Ballantine | U5013 |
| 1964 | Bombshell (Honey West) | Pyramid | R-1106 |
| 1964 | Catch a Falling Spy | MacFadden | 60-168 |
| 1964 | Death on Scurvy Street | Popular Library | 60-2336 |
| 1964 | Deep Blue Good-By (Travis McGee) | Fawcett | R2025 |
| 1964 | Fatal Undertaking (Johnny Liddell) | Dell | 2489 |
| 1964 | Final Curtain (Johnny Liddell) | Dell | 2522 |
| 1964 | Grand Canary | Pyramid | R-1021 |
| 1964 | Guilt Edged Frame, The (Johnny Liddell) | Dell | 3289 |
| 1964 | Headed for a Hearse | MacFadden | 50-221 |
| 1964 | Nightmare in Pink (Travis McGee) | Fawcett | d1682 |
| 1964 | Only on Tuesdays | Dell | 6680 |
| 1964 | Purple Place for Dying, A (Travis McGee) | Fawcett | d1826 |
| 1965 | April Robin Murders, The | Dell | D264 |
| 1965 | Bare Trap (Johnny Liddell) | Dell | D456 |
| 1965 | Blue Mascara Tears | Ballantine | U2239 |
| 1965 | Bright Orange for the Shroud (Travis McGee) | Fawcett | D1573 |
| 1965 | Esprit de Corpse (Johnny Liddell) | Dell | 2409 |
| 1965 | Freakshow | MacFadden | 60-219 |
| 1965 | Girl in the Topless Suit | Pyramid | 1965 |
| 1965 | Love Lush, The | Pyramid | 1965 |
| 1965 | Make My Bed Soon | Avon | G1277 |
| 1965 | Of All the Bloody Cheek | Ballantine | U5023 |
| 1965 | Syndicate Girl | Dell | 8454 |
| 1965 | Two to Tangle (Johnny Liddell) | Dell | 9213 |
| 1965 | Which the Justice, Which the Thief | Avon | S199 |
| 1966 | Beast in the Bedroom | Private Edition | |
| 1966 | Beat Not the Bones | Avon | G1281 |
| 1966 | Beware the Curves | Pocket | 55949 |
| 1966 | Clio | All Star | AS-118 |
| 1966 | Darker Than Amber (Travis McGee) | Fawcett | D1674 |
| 1966 | Darkest Urge, The | Private Edition | |
| 1966 | Dead in Bed (Peter Chambers | Lancer | 72-115 |
| 1966 | Death and Circumstance | Avon | G1288 |
| 1966 | Demon Tower, The | Signet | D3044 |
| 1966 | Echo in a Dark Wind | Signet | D2931 |
| 1966 | Fistful of Death (Fistful of Death) | Signet | D2825 |
| 1966 | French Doll, The | S215 | |
| 1966 | Girl from Havana | All Star | AS112 |
| 1966 | Is There a Traitor in the House | Avon | G1283 |
| 1966 | Mistress, The (Al Wheeler) | Signet | D2996 |
| 1966 | Never Give a Millionaire an Even Break (Peter Chambers) | Lancer (Unauthorized | 72-116 |
| 1966 | One Fearful Yellow Eye (Travis McGee) | Fawcett | D1848 |
| 1966 | Operation Atlantis (Counterspy) | Berkley | F1239 |
| 1966 | Pleasure Island | Signet | D2892 |
| 1966 | Quick Red Fox, The (Travis McGee) | Fawcett | M2828 |
| 1966 | Season for Violence, A | Fawcett | D1676 |
| 1966 | Spoils of the Victors, The | MacFadden | 95-108 |
| 1966 | Target for Their Dark Desire (Al Wheeler) | Signet | D3017 |
| 1966 | Temptress, The (Al Wheeler) | Signet | D2898 |
| 1966 | Virgin Luck | Avon | G1295 |
| 1967 | Crucible | Popular Library | 75-1262 |
| 1967 | Dead Heat (Shell Scott) | Pocket | 50519 |
| 1967 | Dragon Hunt | Signet | P3203 |
| 1967 | Intrusion, The | Signet | P3290 |
| 1967 | Kubla Khan Caper, The (Shell Scott) | Pocket | 50535 |
| 1967 | Lament for a Lousy Lover (Al Wheeler) | Signet | D3162 |
| 1967 | Shaking Shadow, The | Signet | P3186 |
| 1967 | Tigress, The (Al Wheeler) | Signet | D3212 |
| 1968 | Girl in the Plain Brown Wrapper (Travis McGee) | Fawcett | M2430 |
| 1968 | Isle for a Stranger | Ace | H-71 |
| 1968 | Lost Isobel | Signet | P3597 |
| 1968 | Million Dollar Babe, The (Mike Farrel) | Signet | D3636 |
| 1968 | Mist at Darkness, The | Signet | Q6138 |
| 1968 | Pale Gray for Guilt (Travis McGee) | Fawcett | D1893 |
| 1968 | Secrets of Hillyard House | Paperback Library | 54-761 |
| 1968 | Target for Their Dark Desire (Al Wheeler) | Four Square Crime | 2129 |
| 1969 | Alaska Steel (John Fargo) | Belmont | B60-1068 |
| 1969 | Boarding House | MacFadden | 60-419 |
| 1969 | Cheim Manuscript, The (Shell Scott) | Pocket | 75662 |
| 1969 | Count Me In | MacFadden | 60-377 |
| 1969 | Ever-Loving Blues, The | Signet | D3722 |
| 1969 | Fargo (John Fargo) | Belmont | B60-1056 |
| 1969 | Honey | Ballantine | 01793 |
| 1969 | House of Stolen Memories | Lancer | 74-575 |
| 1969 | Island Players, The | Curtis | 502-07124-075 |
| 1969 | Kill Me Tomorrow | Pocket | 55030 |
| 1969 | Kings in Winter, The | Picket | 75380 |
| 1969 | Man-Chaser | MacFadden | 60-408 |
| 1969 | Panama Gold (John Fargo) | Belmont | B60-1058 |
| 1969 | Shell Scott Sampler, The (Shell Scott) | Pocket | 55028 |
| 1969 | Superdoll | Award | A427X |
| 1969 | Third Spectre, The | MacFadden | 60-395 |
| 1969 | Touch of Fear, A | Signet | P3807 |
| 1969 | When Debbie Dared | Golden Griffon | 5654 |

Some of Lesser's most notable work is his western covers of the Buchanan series using model Steve Holland. Lesser took over the bulk of the series' paperback cover illustrations in 1971 after the departure of the series' regular artist, Lu Kimmel. Also, using Steve Holland as the model, Lesser painted covers for the early installments of the Ben Haas western series Fargo.

Beginning in 1970, Lesser began painting covers for the sexy Tower Publications spy series The Lady from L.U.S.T., authored by multiple Alley Awards winner and DC Comics staple Gardner Fox. In 1973, Lesser started painting covers for a police procedural series starring popular fictional series character Los Angeles Police Department Homicide Lieutenant Luis Mendoza, authored by Elizabeth Linington using the pseudonym Dell Shannon.

Other notable work Lesser paperback paintings in the 1970s include series titles like Renegade, Sam Durrell, Cherry Delight, and Dan Fortune. Lesser used models Steve Holland, Lisa Karan, and his wife, Claudia Lesser.

1970s
| Year | Title | Publisher | Number |
|---|---|---|---|
| 1970 | 69 Pleasures, The (Lady from L.U.S.T., The) | Tower | 43-912 |
| 1970 | Apache Raiders (John Fargo, Partial) | Belmont | B60-2004 |
| 1970 | Arizona | Ballantine | 02076 |
| 1970 | Behold the Upright | Apollo | 00104 |
| 1970 | Bright to the Wanderer | Popular | 95-154 |
| 1970 | Bugle and Spur | Ballantine | 02077 |
| 1970 | Forked Tongue | Ballantine | 01819 |
| 1970 | Fort Starvation | Bantam | |
| 1970 | Galloway | Bantam | 10795X |
| 1970 | Heller with a Gun | Fawcett | D2031 |
| 1970 | Judgment Trail | Ballantine | 02311 |
| 1970 | Lust, Be a Lady Tonight | Belmont Tower | 50516 |
| 1970 | Man from Robber's Roost | Pocket | 55108 |
| 1970 | Morgan | Paperback Library | 63-423 |
| 1970 | Nevermore Affair, The | Curtis | 123-07011-075 |
| 1970 | Of Good and Evil | Ballantine | 01850-8-095 |
| 1970 | Ransome Castle | Apollo | 103 |
| 1970 | Reach for Gold | Pyramid | |
| 1970 | Santa Fe Passage | Bantam | H5540 |
| 1970 | Season of Vengeance | Bantam | 14741 |
| 1970 | Sons of Darkness, Sons of Light | Pocket | 77187 |
| 1970 | Steel Web, The | Bantam | |
| 1970 | Tall Men, The | Bantam | N8716 |
| 1970 | Tough Bullet (Carmody) | Belmont | B60-2021 |
| 1970 | Trouble with Lazy Ethel | Ballantine | 01851 |
| 1970 | Victorian Crown, The | Belmont | B75-2042 |
| 1970 | Whip, The | Bantam | H5512 |
| 1971 | Buchanan Gets Mad (Tom Buchanan) | Fawcett | D2546 |
| 1971 | Buchanan's War (Tom Buchanan) | Fawcett | R2396 |
| 1971 | Fannin | Belmont | B75-2109 |
| 1971 | His Majesty's Yankee | Popular Library | 95-202 |
| 1971 | House of Deadly Calm | Apollo | |
| 1971 | In the Company of Eagles | Ballantine | |
| 1971 | Majority of Scoundrels, A | Ballantine | 02571-7-125 |
| 1971 | Mohave Crossing | S6756 | |
| 1971 | Rustler's Rock | Pocket | |
| 1971 | Sagebrush Swindle | Pocket | |
| 1971 | Twilight for the Gods | Ballantine | 02143-6-095 |
| 1972 | Assignment Ankara (Sam Durell) | Fawcett | T2599 |
| 1972 | Avengers, The | Ballantine | |
| 1972 | Bayou Guns | Pyramid | 445-01629-075 |
| 1972 | Buchanan's Gamble (Tom Buchanan) | Fawcett | T2656 |
| 1972 | Decoy, The | Fawcett | T2588 |
| 1972 | Italian Connection, The (Cherry Delight | Leisure | LB106Z K |
| 1972 | Land is Bright, The | Ballantine | 02347-1-125 |
| 1972 | One-Man Massacre (Tom Buchanan) | Fawcett | T2597 |
| 1972 | Ranger Rides the Death Trail, A (Walt Slade) | Pyramid | |
| 1972 | Trail Ends at Hell, The | Belmont Tower | 50294 |
| 1972 | Trap for Buchanan (Tom Buchanan) | Fawcett | T2579 |
| 1973 | Alaska Steel (John Fargo) | Belmont | BT50550 |
| 1973 | Amos Flagg: High Gun (Amos Flagg) | Belmont Tower | K1596 |
| 1973 | Big Kiss-Off, The | Triphammer (Unauthorized) | |
| 1973 | Beds to Mecca (Lady from L.U.S.T., The) | Belmont Tower | BT50566 |
| 1973 | Buchanan on the Prod (Tom Buchanan) | Fawcett | P3472 |
| 1973 | Buchanan's Siege (Tom Buchanan) | Fawcett | 1-3786-4 |
| 1973 | Case of the Brazen Beauty (Pete Selby) | 50592 | |
| 1973 | Alaska Steel (John Fargo) | Belmont | 50550 |
| 1973 | Horror at Gull House | Belmont Tower | 50522 |
| 1973 | Indian Killer, The | Belmont Tower | 50519 |
| 1973 | Kiss My Assassin (Lady from L.U.S.T., The) | Belmont Tower | 50594 |
| 1973 | Last Place God Made, The | Fawcett | Q2758 |
| 1973 | Lay Me Odds (Lady from L.U.S.T., The) | Belmont Tower | |
| 1973 | Ringer, The (Luis Mendoza) | Belmont Tower | 50517 |
| 1973 | Slavers, The (Carmody) | Leisure | LB12JNK |
| 1973 | South of the Bordello (Lady from L.U.S.T., The) | Belmont Tower | BT50582 |
| 1973 | Unexpected Death (Luis Mendoza) | Belmont Tower | 50501 |
| 1973 | Wildcatters, The (John Fargo) | Belmont | BT50583 |
| 1974 | Destructors, The | Ballantine | 24190 |
| 1974 | Ever After | Popular Library | 445-00226-095 |
| 1974 | Judas Cross | Avon | 36426 |
| 1974 | Kilrone | Bantam | 20882-9 |
| 1974 | Mad River | Fawcett | d1871 |
| 1974 | No Holiday for Crime (Luis Mendoza) | Belmont Tower | 50639 |
| 1974 | Whim to Kill (Luis Mendoza) | Belmont | 50756 |
| 1974 | Zardoz | Signet | 451-Q5830 |
| 1975 | After the Last Race | Fawcett Crest | Q2650 |
| 1975 | Buchanan Calls the Shots (Tom Buchanan) | Fawcett | M3429 |
| 1975 | Emerald Canyon | Belmont Tower | 50809 |
| 1975 | Sixth Directorate, The (Peter Marlow) | Fawcett Crest | 2-2938-6 |
| 1975 | Skirmish | Fawcett | Q2867 |
| 1976 | Black Work | Signet | 451-E7538 |
| 1976 | Guns of the Timberlands | Bantam | Q2281 |
| 1976 | Catch a Rising Star | Fawcett | 1-3636-1 |
| 1977 | Assignment Zoraya (Sam Durell) | Fawcett | 1-4184-5 |
| 1977 | Buchanan's Texas Treasure | Fawcett | 1-3812-7 |
| 1977 | Neutron Two | Avon | 35089 |
| 1977 | War in Sandoval County | Bantam | 12691 |
| 1978 | Assassin, The | Berkley | |
| 1978 | Comes a Horseman | Dell | 11509 |
| 1978 | Crazy in Berlin (Carlo Reinhart) | Ballantine | 27173 |
| 1978 | First Campaign | Bantam | |
| 1978 | No Laughing Matter | Ace Tempo | |
| 1978 | Pleasant Places | Fawcett | 2-3769-9 |
| 1978 | Reinhart in Love | Ballantine | 27174 |
| 1978 | Vital Parts | Ballantine | 27175 |
| 1978 | Walk a Black Wind (Dan Fortune) | Playboy Press | 16478 |
| 1979 | Bad Lands, The | Fawcett | |
| 1979 | Blood Runner (Renegade) | Warner | |
| 1979 | Buchanan's Manhunt (Tom Buchanan) | Fawcett | 1-4119-5 |
| 1979 | Death List | Dell | 11841 |
| 1979 | Death Tide | Jove | |
| 1979 | Forest Things | Dell | 12593 |
| 1979 | Forever Sophia: An Intimate Portrait | Baronet | |
| 1979 | Great Silver Bonanza, The | Fawcett | 1-4202-7 |
| 1979 | King Jaguar | Fawcett | |
| 1979 | Lure of the Outlaw Trail | Ballantine | |
| 1979 | Only For Today | Ace | 63090-1 |
| 1979 | Renegade (Renegade) | Warner | |
| 1979 | Shadow of the Wolf | Ballantine | |
| 1979 | Showdown at Cibecue Creek | Ace | |
| 1979 | Zinsser Implant, The | Dell | 19889 |

1980s
| Year | Title | Publisher | Number |
|---|---|---|---|
| 1980 | Chesapeake Cavalier | Charter | 10345 |
| 1980 | Cover Stories | Dell | 11522 |
| 1980 | Death Hunter (Renegade) | Warner | 94-233 |
| 1980 | Down River | Dell | 11830 |
| 1980 | Fear Merchant (Renegade) | Warner | 94-161 |
| 1980 | Fort Starvation | Bantam | 14180 |
| 1980 | Foxbat Spiral, The | Dell | 12582-2 |
| 1980 | Hunting Shack, The | Dell | 13300 |
| 1980 | Islands | Dell | 13402 |
| 1980 | Last Liberator | Dell | 15071 |
| 1980 | Outlaw | Bantam | 10727 |
| 1980 | Red-12 | Dell | 17429 |
| 1980 | Searchers, The | Ace | 75692 |
| 1980 | Traitor Blitz, The | Popular Library | |
| 1980 | Unforgiven, The | Ace | |
| 1981 | Above Suspicion | Fawcett | |
| 1981 | Armageddon Game | Dell | |
| 1981 | Crossfire Trail | Ace | 12280 |
| 1981 | Day of Wrath | Dell | 0440-11898-0 |
| 1981 | Debt of Honor | Dell | 19156 |
| 1981 | Earhart Betrayal, The | Popular Library | |
| 1981 | Hunter Equation, The | Dell | |
| 1981 | Kilrone | Bantam | |
| 1981 | Last Liberator, The | Dell | 14321 |
| 1981 | Luciano's Luck | Dell | 14321 |
| 1981 | Marchand Woman, The | Berkley | 0-425-04731-8 |
| 1981 | On Wings of Fire | Dell | |
| 1981 | Santa Fe Passage | Bantam | 14540 |
| 1981 | Season of Vengeance | Bantam | 14741-2 |
| 1981 | Slade's Glacier | Dell | 18441 |
| 1981 | Solstice Cipher, The | Dell | 18096 |
| 1981 | Web, The | Dell | 19440 |
| 1991 | Bloody Border | Dell | 21031-3 |
| 1994 | South Will Rise Again, The | Dell | 21045-3 |
| 1982 | Arizona Fancy Lady (Spur McCoy, Unauthorized) | Leisure | |
| 1982 | Bent Star, The | Tower | 51843 |
| 1982 | Buchanan's Revenge (Tom Buchanan) | Fawcett | 1-4179-9 |
| 1982 | Cathedral | Dell | |
| 1982 | Debt of Honor | Dell | |
| 1982 | High Plains Temptress (Spur McCoy, Unauthorized) | Leisure | 1123 |
| 1982 | Luciano's Luck | Dell | 14321 |
| 1982 | Night-Wind | Dell | 15757 |
| 1982 | When Dragons Dance | Avon | 79145 |
| 1983 | All Things in Their Season | Dell | 10057 |
| 1983 | Flight of the Falcon | Fawcett Crest | 0-499 20271-2 |
| 1983 | Free Woman, The | Dell | |
| 1983 | Moonlight Splendor | Harlequin Superromance | HS-81 |
| 1983 | Osprey Dilemma, The | Dell | 16159 |
| 1983 | Outback, The | Dell | |
| 1983 | Pioneers, The | Signet | 451-AE2274 |
| 1983 | Press Lord, The | Dell | 17080 |
| 1983 | Queen's Messenger, The | Dell | |
| 1983 | Scorpion's Sting, The | Dell | 17872 |
| 1983 | Serengeti Sunrise | Harlequin Superromance | HS-92 |
| 1983 | Barrabas Run, The (SOBs) | Gold Eagle | |
| 1983 | Worldly Goods | Bantam | |
| 1984 | Armageddon Conspiracy (Track | Gold Eagle | |
| 1984 | Atrocity (Track) | Gold Eagle | |
| 1984 | Butchers of Eden (SOBs) | Gold Eagle | |
| 1984 | Colonists (Australians, The) | Dell | |
| 1984 | Delta Nights | Harlequin Superromance | HS-145 |
| 1984 | Hard Way, The (Track) | Gold Eagle | |
| 1984 | Ninety-Nine, The (Track) | Gold Eagle | |
| 1984 | Plains of Fire (SOBs) | Gold Eagle | |
| 1984 | Show No Mercy (SOBs) | Gold Eagle | |
| 1984 | To Catch the Wind | Harlequin Superromance | HS-118 |
| 1984 | Triangles of Fire | Dell | |
| 1984 | Wild Seed | Zebra-Kensington | |
| 1985 | Eye of the Fire (SOBs) | Gold Eagle | |
| 1985 | Gulag War (SOBs) | Gold Eagle | |
| 1985 | Red Hammer Down (SOBs) | Gold Eagle | |
| 1985 | River of Flesh (SOBs) | Gold Eagle | |
| 1985 | Some Choose Hell (SOBs) | Gold Eagle | |
| 1985 | Tyler's Woman | Avon | |
| 1985 | Vultures of the Horn (SOBs) | Gold Eagle | |
| 1986 | Agile Retrieval (SOBs) | Gold Eagle | |
| 1986 | Death Deal (SOBs) | Gold Eagle | |
| 1986 | Firestorm U.S.A. (SOBs) | Gold Eagle | |
| 1986 | Goodly Heritage | Ballantine | 32999 |
| 1986 | Jihad (SOBs) | Gold Eagle | |
| 1986 | No Sanctuary (SOBs) | Gold Eagle | 61613 |
| 1986 | Point Blank (SOBs) | Gold Eagle | |
| 1986 | Wildcat Summer | Harlequin Superromance | HR-218 |
| 1987 | Alaska Deception (SOBs) | Gold Eagle | |
| 1987 | Bandini Affair, The (Benny Freedman) | | |
| 1987 | Black Market | Pocket | 63921-8 |
| 1987 | Cover | Warner | 30245-7 |
| 1987 | Kremlin Devils (SOBs) | Gold Eagle | |
| 1987 | Live Girls | Pocket | 62628-0 |
| 1987 | Night of the Fox | Pocket | |
| 1987 | No Safe Place (SOBs) | Gold Eagle | |
| 1987 | Price, The | Fawcett | 13129-7 |
| 1987 | Sakhalin Breakout (SOBs) | Gold Eagle | |
| 1987 | Skyjack (SOBs) | Gold Eagle | |
| 1987 | Whole Truth, The | Harlequin Superromance | HS-280 |
| 1988 | Alpha Bug | Pocket | 63668-5 |
| 1988 | Banshee | Worldwide Library | |
| 1988 | Barrabas Creed, The (SOBs) | Gold Eagle | |
| 1988 | Barrabas Edge, The (SOBs) | Gold Eagle | |
| 1988 | Barrabas Fallout, The (SOBs) | Gold Eagle | |
| 1988 | Barrabas Fix, The (SOBs) | Gold Eagle | |
| 1988 | Barrabas Raid, The (SOBs) | Gold Eagle | |
| 1988 | Battle Stations | Signet | |
| 1988 | Crucifax | Pocket | 62629-9 |
| 1988 | Diamond Spur | Popular Library | 20514-8 |
| 1988 | Directive Sixteen | Pocket | |
| 1988 | Graveyard Rules | Pocket | |
| 1988 | Hour of the Fox | Signet | |
| 1988 | Man with a Gun | Pocket | |
| 1988 | No Lesser Plea | Signet | |
| 1988 | Pacific Payload (SOBs) | Gold Eagle | |
| 1988 | Rampage | Pocket | 64852-7 |
| 1989 | Barrabas Fire, The (SOBs) | Gold Eagle | |
| 1989 | Barrabas Heist, The (SOBs) | Gold Eagle | |
| 1989 | Barrabas Hit, The (SOBs) | Gold Eagle | |
| 1989 | Barrabas Kill, The (SOBs) | Gold Eagle | |
| 1989 | Barrabas Thrust, The (SOBs | Gold Eagle | |
| 1989 | Camelot Jones | Avon | 0-380-75589-0 |
| 1989 | Cannibal, The (Joe Ryker | | |
| 1989 | Day of Judgment | Pocket | 72772-9 |
| 1989 | Death Squad, The (Joe Ryker) | | |
| 1989 | Eagle Has Landed (Liam Devlin) | Pocket | |
| 1989 | Favored Child, The | Pocket | |
| 1989 | Hammer of God, The | | |
| 1989 | Night of the Phoenix | | |
| 1989 | Promises | Warner | |
| 1989 | Run to Morning, The | Pocket | |
| 1989 | Royal Treatment, The | Harlequin | |
| 1989 | Smack Man, The | Pocket | 63212-4 |
| 1989 | Storm Warning | Pocket | |
| 1989 | Tangled Murders | Pocket | |
| 1989 | Waves of Glory | Popular Library | 20731-09 |

1990s
| Year | Title | Publisher | Number |
|---|---|---|---|
| 1990 | Billy Bathgate | Harper & Row | 0-06-100007-8 |
| 1990 | Blind Side | Signet | |
| 1990 | Blood Sisters | Pocket | 67399-8 |
| 1990 | Final Cut, The | Bantam | |
| 1990 | Immediate Prospect of Being Hanged | Onyx | |
| 1990 | Naked Heart, The | Dell | |
| 1990 | Night Hawk, The (Floating Outfit | Dell | |
| 1990 | Season in Hell, A (Tony Villiers) | Pocket | |
| 1990 | Tides of Valor, The | Mysterious Press | |
| 1990 | Time of the Wolf | | |
| 1990 | Bone Orchard, The | Signet | 451-AE7014 |
| 1991 | Captain Butterfly | Signet | |
| 1991 | Flowers of Betrayal | Onyx | 451-JE247 |
| 1991 | True Colors | Warner | 36115-1 |
| 1992 | Blood Confessions | Dell | |
| 1992 | Judas Kiss, The | Signet | 451-AE7319 |
| 1992 | Power and Glory | Dell | |
| 1993 | Alternate Oscars | Delta | |
| 1993 | Mafia Wars | Onyx | |
| 1993 | Nebraska Crossing (Rails West!) | Jove | 0-515-11205-4 |
| 1993 | Rails West! (Rails West!) | Jove | 0-515-11099-X |
| 1993 | Sheikh's Revenge, The | Harlequin | |
| 1993 | Stranger in the Mist | Silhouette | 2-7003-1 |
| 1993 | Texas Fury (Ole Devil) | Dell | 21044-5 |
| 1993 | Wealth and Passion | Dell | |
| 1994 | Dark Fire (Too Hot to Handle) | Harlequin | 1735 |
| 1994 | Saint Mudd | Penguin | |
| 1994 | Wyoming Territory (Rails West!) | Jove | |
| 1996 | Devious Desire | Harlequin | 1827 |
| 1996 | Exocet (Tony Villiers) | Pocket | |
| 1997 | Confessional (Liam Devlin) | Pocket | |
| 1997 | Scandalous Bride | Harlequin | 1936 |

2000+
| Year | Title | Publisher | Number |
|---|---|---|---|
| 2001 | Going Home (Barnaby Skye) | Forge | |
| 2001 | West to Comanche County | Force | |
| 2009 | Honey in His Mouth | Hard Case Crime | |
| 2010 | Nobody's Angel | Hard Case Crime | |
| 2011 | Quarry in the Middle (Quarry) | Hard Case Crime | |
| 2012 | Complete Slayers, The | Centipede Press | |
| 2016 | Man Drowning | Centipede Press | |
| 2017 | Lenient Beast, The | Centipede Press | |
| 2017 | Wench is Dead | Centipede Press | |
| 2022 | Quarry's Blood (Quarry) | Hard Case Crime | |

== Magazines ==
All Years
| Year-Month | Magazine | Story | Placement |
|---|---|---|---|
| 1963-Apr. | Man's Magazine | "38" | Interior |
| 1963-Nov. | Argosy | "Murder Caribbean Style"' | Interior |
| 1963-Dec. | True Adventures | "Passion Girl" | Interior |
| 1964-Apr. | Argosy | "The Moonshiners" | Interior |
| 1970-Oct. | Guy (Unauthorized) | | Cover |
| 1970-Dec. | Adventure | "Bush Happy" | Cover & Interior |
| 1973-Aug. | Mike Shayne's Mystery Magazine | | Cover |
| 2000-Spring/Summer | Cigar Smoker Magazine | "Hidden Assets" | |

== The Art of Ron Lesser ==
A series of full color books celebrating Ron Lesser's prolific career is being co-edited and published by pulp culture historian Robert Deis and book designer Bill Cunningham. The books were designed by Cunningham (Pulp 2.0 Press) for Deis' Subtropic Productions imprint.

The first volume, The Art of Ron Lesser Vol. 1: Deadly Dames and Sexy Sirens, published in 2023, showcases paperback cover, magazine and movie poster artwork created by the artist from 1959 through 1979. The book also includes an extensive interview with Lesser conducted by vintage paperback expert J. Kingston Pierce covering the artist's career, painting techniques, and the various models and publishers he utilized for his vivid paintings.

The Art of Ron Lesser Vol. 2: Dangerous Dames and Cover Dolls was published in 2024. It features scores of original paintings of sexy real and fictional women Ron has created in recent decades, including Marilyn Monroe, Bettie Page, Brigitte Bardot, Vampirella and Red Sonja. Lesser Vol. 2 also includes an introduction by Daniel Zimmer, editor of Illustration Magazine, and a foreword by the popular comic book and book cover artist Joe Jusko.
