= Les Bowie =

British special effect artist (1913–1979)

Les Bowie (November 10, 1913 – January 27, 1979) was a special effects artist working mainly in Britain.

== Career ==
Bowie began his career as a matte painter in 1946. His work found places in classic films such as Great Expectations, Oliver Twist and The Red Shoes.

He created his own company in 1951 and worked freelance on projects for relatively low-budget studios such as Hammer Films and Oakmont Productions. His films for Hammer included The Quatermass Xperiment (1955), Dracula (1958) and Kiss of the Vampire (1963). His Oakmont films were Attack on the Iron Coast, Submarine X-1 and Mosquito Squadron. Bowie worked with Ray Harryhausen on Jason and the Argonauts, First Men in the Moon, One Million Years B.C. and Sinbad and the Eye of the Tiger.

Notable non-Hammer films included The Day the Earth Caught Fire (1961), Fahrenheit 451 (1966) Casino Royale (1967) and The Assassination Bureau (1969).

He was also one of a team to win an Oscar for his work on the 1978 film Superman, specialising in mattes and composites.
