= Brian Duffy (photographer) =

English photographer and film producer

- Self-portrait of Duffy, 1968
- Born: 15 June 1933; United Kingdom
- Died: 31 May 2010 (aged 76); United Kingdom
- Occupations: Photographer, film producer
- Children: Christopher, Charlotte, Samantha & Carey

Brian Duffy (15 June 1933 – 31 May 2010) was an English photographer and film producer, best remembered for his fashion and portrait photography of the 1960s and 1970s.

== Early life ==
Brian Duffy was born to Irish parents in London in 1933. During World War II he was evacuated with his two brothers and sister to Kings Langley where he was taken in by the actors Roger Livesey and Ursula Jeans. After a few weeks, his mother, unhappy about her four children being split up from the family insisted they all return to London. When the bombing in London became intense they were evacuated for a second time to Wales but returned to London having lived on a remote farm for a month.

Once back in London, Duffy 'had the most wonderful war', breaking into abandoned houses and running wild. Only when it was over did he start school, first attending a liberal school in Chelsea where the London County Council had adopted a policy that treated difficult children with a programme of cultural experiences to broaden their horizons. Duffy was involved in several bouts of trouble and was moved onto another school for difficult boys in Kentish Town where once again the emphasis was placed on treating troubled youths through cultural inclusion which involved school trips to the Opera, ballet, art galleries and cultural institutions. It was here that Duffy unveiled his creative tendencies and upon finishing school he applied to Saint Martin's School of Art. In 1950 he started art school to be a painter but soon realised that his peers were more talented and moved onto a dress design course 'where all the pretty girls were'. He finished St. Martin's in 1953 and immediately began working as an assistant designer at Susan Small, after which he worked for Victor Stiebel, the preferred designer to Princess Margaret. Following this, on a visit to Paris, he was offered a job at Balenciaga but was unable to take it up as his wife, June, was pregnant with their eldest son, Chris.

== Photographic career ==
In 1955 Duffy began freelancing as a fashion artist for Harper's Bazaar where he first came into contact with commercial photography. Inspired by the photographic contact sheets he saw passing through the art director's desk he sought a job as a photographer's assistant. Unsuccessfully, he applied for a job with John French and was subsequently employed at Carlton Studios and then at Cosmopolitan Artists. Duffy went on to work as an assistant to the photographer Adrian Flowers during which time he received his first photographic commission from Ernestine Carter, who at the time was the fashion editor of The Sunday Times.

In 1957 Duffy was hired by British Vogue working under art director John Parsons where he remained working until October 1962. During this time he worked closely with top models Jean Shrimpton (whom he introduced to David Bailey), Paulene Stone, Joy Weston, Tania Mallet, Marie-Lise Gres, Jennifer Hocking, and Judy Dent.

With fellow photographers David Bailey and Terence Donovan, Duffy was a key player in the 'Swinging Sixties' - a culture of high fashion and celebrity chic. Together the 'Black Trinity' as affectionately named by Norman Parkinson (and only ever referred to by their surnames), redefined not only the aesthetic of fashion photography but also the place of the photographer within the industry. Socialising with actors, pop stars, royalty, and the notorious Kray Twins, they represented a new breed of a photographer and found themselves elevated to celebrity status. Duffy commented on the culture shock the three were to the industry:

"Before 1960, a fashion photographer was tall, thin, and camp. But we three are different: short, fat, and heterosexual!"

After leaving Vogue, Duffy still provided fashion photography for the magazine. He also worked for numerous publications including Nova, London Life, Cosmopolitan, Esquire, Town, Queen, The Observer, The Sunday Times Magazine, and the Telegraph Magazine. He worked for Swiss art director Peter Knapp and later Foulia Elia for French Elle for two periods the first between 1962 and 1966, and then again between 1974 and 1979. Duffy claimed that he did some of his best work working with French Elle. Duffy was also a highly successful commercial advertising photographer shooting award-winning campaigns for both Benson & Hedges and Smirnoff in the 1970s as well as designing the concept for Silk Cut which he sold to Paul Arden at Saatchi & Saatchi.

In 1965 Duffy was asked to shoot the second Pirelli calendar which was shot on location in the south of France. He was commissioned to shoot the calendar again in 1973 (one of the very few photographers commissioned to shoot two) which he created in collaboration with British pop artist Allen Jones and airbrush specialist Philip Castle. In 1968 he set up a film production company with Len Deighton called Deighton Duffy and went on to produce Only When I Larf, based on Deighton's book (1967), and Oh! What a Lovely War, which was released in 1969. Continuing Duffy's lifelong interest in the First World War, in 1985 he directed Lions Led By Donkeys for Channel Four.

Duffy had an eight-year working relationship with the artist David Bowie and shot five key sessions over this period providing the creative concept as well as the photographic image for three album covers: Aladdin Sane (1973) when Duffy interpreted Bowie's original title of 'A Lad Insane' as 'Aladdin Sane', Lodger (1979) and Scary Monsters (and Super Creeps) (1980). Duffy also photographed Bowie as his character Ziggy Stardust in July 1972, and on the set of Nicolas Roeg's cult film The Man Who Fell to Earth (1976) on location for The Sunday Times. Duffy's input had a significant influence on the creation of Bowie's chameleon-like public image and in 2014 Chris Duffy and Kevin Cann co-authored a book chronicling these shoots titled Duffy Bowie: Five Sessions.

In 1979 Duffy abruptly gave up photography, attempting to burn many of his negatives in his studio yard. Fortunately, his neighbours objected to the acrid smoke, and the council was called to step in, and much of his work was saved. Although a large number of his images were lost the ones that remain stand collectively as a comprehensive visual history of twenty-five years of British culture and fashion.

The story of his life and work is documented in a BBC Four documentary aired in January 2010 titled The Man Who Shot the 60s.

== Film production and commercials ==
Duffy moved onto television commercials and in 1981 joined the film production company Lewin Matthews in 1983 Duffy directed the music video for "Gold" by Spandau Ballet, ABC's "All of My Heart", and "Mirror Man" for The Human League. Between 1984 and 1986 Duffy worked for Paul Kramer Productions in New York. Upon his return to the UK, he set up his own film production company "3DZ" with his two sons Chris Duffy and Carey Duffy, and pioneered the Super16 film format shooting TV commercials and pop videos including the British Steel flotation in 1988.

== Antique furniture restoration ==
By 1990 Duffy retired from all image making and followed his lifelong passion for furniture restoration and became an accredited BAFRA (British Antique Furniture Restoration Association) restorer.

== Death ==
Duffy died on 31 May 2010 after suffering from the degenerative lung disease pulmonary fibrosis.

== Legacy and The Duffy Archive ==
In 2008 Duffy's son Chris started The Duffy Archive and in October 2009 Duffy's work was exhibited for the first time at the Chris Beetles Gallery, London (now known as Huxley-Parlour). Interest has grown year after year in Duffy's work and in 2012 Duffy had twelve international exhibitions including three solo museum shows at the Museo Nazionale Alinari della Fotografia Florence, Monash Art Gallery in Melbourne, Australia, and the Centro De Historias Museum Zaragoza, Spain. Duffy's work was also exhibited in the National Portrait Gallery (Beatles to Bowie), The Tate Liverpool (Glam), and the V&A (British Design 1947-2012).

In June 2011 Duffy's son Chris authored a monograph of Duffy's images which was published by ACC Editions titled Duffy - Photographer and featured over 160 iconic images from the 1950s, 1960s, and 1970s.

In 2011 the V&A Museum London requested Duffy prints for their permanent collection.

In 2013 the Duffy Archive was approached by the V&A to supply an image for the 'David Bowie is' exhibition and a previously unpublished David Bowie 'Eyes Open' image from the Aladdin Sane contact sheet was chosen as their key promotional image. This exhibition and image have been shown worldwide and is almost as famous as the original Aladdin Sane album cover. The exhibition opened at the V&A Museum on 23 March 2013 and after a worldwide tour closed in the Brooklyn Museum, New York on 15 July 2018.

Duffy was included in the 2013 Professional Photographer list of the 100 most influential photographers of all time.

In 2014 the National Portrait Gallery hosted Bailey's 'Stardust' exhibition and featured Duffy under two categories 'artists' and 'icons'. Duffy was Bailey's friend and sparring partner and Bailey was famously quoted as saying "Aggravation and Duffy go together like gin and tonic".

At the end of 2014 in conjunction with French Elle Chris Duffy co-authored a book with Emma Baxter-Wright on Duffy's work with French Elle (currently only available in French) Mode sixties and seventies: Dans l'oeil de Brian Duffy.

In 2018 a second edition revised and updated version of 'Duffy - Photographer' was published by ACC Editions with 16 pages of additional content.

During 2019 Duffy's images were included in the V&A Museum Exhibitions 'Cars: Accelerating the Modern World' and 'Mary Quant' respectively. On 9 June the V&A held a members-only event 'Dinner and a Movie: Duffy: The Man Who Shot the Sixties' which screened the 2010 BBC documentary on Duffy's life and career followed by a Q&A with Chris Duffy.

In February 2020 'Secrets of the Museum' is a six-part documentary made by Blast! Films for BBC Two featured Chris Duffy donating an outtake image from the 1973 Aladdin Sane album cover shoot titled 'David Bowie Is...Watching You' to the V&A for its permanent collection.
