= The Texican =

1966 film produced and written by John C. Champion and directed by Lesley Selander

- Original U.S. theatrical release poster
- Directed by: Lesley Selander
- Written by: John C. Champion; José Antonio de la Loma
- Produced by: John Champion; Bruce Balaban
- Starring: Audie Murphy; Broderick Crawford
- Cinematography: Francisco Marin
- Edited by: Teresa Alcocer
- Music by: Nico Fidenco; Robby Poitevin
- Color process: Technicolor
- Production companies: M.C.R. Productions I.N.C. Balcázar Producciones Cinematográficas
- Distributed by: Columbia Pictures
- Release date: October 1966
- Running time: 89 minutes
- Countries: Spain; United States
- Language: English

The Texican is a 1966 American Techniscope Western film produced and written by John C. Champion and directed by Lesley Selander. It is a paella western remake of their 1948 film Panhandle adapted for the persona of Audie Murphy that featured Broderick Crawford as the heavy. The film was re-titled Ringo il Texano in Italy to coincide with the popularity of the Ringo Spaghetti Western film series.

== Plot ==
The town of Rimrock, Arizona is run by political boss Luke Starr (Broderick Crawford). When one of Starr's henchmen wishes to escape from Starr he meets with the editor of the town newspaper, Roy Carlin (Víctor Vilanova), to ask for his help. Starr discovers the meeting and he and his loyal henchmen shoot both of them, spreading the story that the two killed each other in a gunfight.

Roy Carlin's brother Jess (Audie Murphy) is a former Texas sheriff now living in semi-retirement with his girlfriend in Mexico. He has a price on his head for unstated crimes committed in the United States but earns income and beats the boredom of his quiet life by capturing fugitive American criminals and turning them over to American lawmen who return them across the border.

When Jess finds out the story of his brother he renounces the quiet life to bring his brother's killer to justice, as he knows Roy never carried a firearm. On the way he is unsuccessfully ambushed by bounty hunters and has to escape without his saddle.

Stopping off at a ranch he thinks is unoccupied, he leaves money for a saddle but is held at gunpoint by the ranch owner Sandy (Luz Márquez). She changes her opinion on Jess after discovering he has left money as payment that is four times the value of the saddle.

Riding into Rimrock, Jess unsuccessfully tries to find out more about his brother's death. The new editor of the paper asks Jess to stay to eliminate Luke Starr and his band. Jess explains that in the past, when he was a sheriff in the same town where his brother was a newspaper editor, they cleaned up the town but found out the hard way that the men who replaced those they got rid of were much worse.

After fist and gun fights, Jess is finally able to establish proof of Luke's involvement in the killing when he finds a decorative concho that leather worker Sandy is able to identify as one that came off Luke's gun belt.

== Cast ==
- Audie Murphy as Jess Carlin
- Broderick Crawford as Luke Starr
- Diana Lorys as Kit O'Neal
- Luz Márquez as Sandy Adams
- Anthony Casas as Frank Brady
- Antonio Molino Rojo as Harv
- Aldo Sambrell as Gil Rio
- John Peral as Eb
- Helga Genth as Mrs. Maria Banta
- George Rigaud as Mitch
- Luis Induni as U.S. Marshal
- Marta May as Elena
- Víctor Vilanova as Roy Carlin
- Gérard Tichy as Boyd Thompson
- Emilio Rodríguez as Mitch
- Frank Braña as U.S. Marshal Vic
- Carlos Hurtado as Tobe Banta
- Víctor Israel as Wilkins
- José Manuel Pinillos as Miguel
- César Ojinaga as Bounty Hunter
- Vicente Soler as Dr. Miller
- Juan Torres as Bartender
- Santiago Rivero as Horse Buyer
- Manuel Quintana as The Gunslinger
- Carlos Miguel Solá as First Poker Player
- Angel Lombardi as Second Poker Player
- A. Malla as Mexican Boy
- Oscar Del Campo as Singer and Guitar Player

== Production ==
Audie Murphy was one of the many stars who turned down Sergio Leone's A Fistful of Dollars because he recognised that the screenplay was an uncredited copy of Akira Kurosawa’s Yojimbo. With Westerns being not only in demand but cheap to produce in Europe, the film crew travelled to Spain in September 1965 to shoot the film. Murphy recalled he had to perform his own stunts and “had to do everything myself except pack my own lunch”.

A third partner in the MCR (Murphy, Champion & SelandeR) Production company, Murphy had a large say in the making of the film. The team was to have made another film in Spain, Maverick Guns with Cesar Romero and Gary Crosby but it was never made.

Producer and writer John C. Champion, whose first film had been Panhandle, had made several Westerns in America and the Laramie Western series. After his Spanish venture, he moved to England and started Oakmont Productions to film war films for Mirisch Productions. Lesley Selander finished his career directing Westerns for A.C. Lyles.
