= Only When I Larf (film) =

1968 British film by Basil Dearden

- Original British Quad Poster
- Directed by: Basil Dearden
- Screenplay by: John Salmon
- Based on: Only When I Larf by Len Deighton
- Produced by: Len Deighton; Brian Duffy
- Starring: Richard Attenborough; David Hemmings; Alexandra Stewart; Nicholas Pennell
- Cinematography: Anthony B. Richmond
- Edited by: Fergus McDonell
- Music by: Ron Grainer
- Production companies: Beecord Production; Deigton/Duffy Production
- Distributed by: Paramount British Pictures
- Release date: May 1968
- Running time: 104 minutes
- Country: United Kingdom
- Language: English

Only When I Larf is a 1968 British comedy crime drama, directed by Basil Dearden and starring Richard Attenborough, David Hemmings, and Alexandra Stewart. It was adapted from the 1968 novel Only When I Larf by Len Deighton, and features Attenborough as an ex-brigadier con man in a variety of guises.

== Plot ==
In New York City, a trio of confidence tricksters enter a tall office block and go to an empty unit on the 39th floor. They quickly change the identity of the office. Two Americans arrive. Lowther assumes the role of Mr Stevens, the boss. Bob is ushered in by the secretary and introduced as Mr Glover. They discuss high finance in front of the Americans. They persuade the Americans to write a cheque for $250,000. He writes a cheque for $2 million to them. The cheques are placed in a faux wall safe. Bob goes to other side and takes the smaller cheque out. He re-disguises himself as a security guard. He goes to the bank with Liz and she withdraws the $250,000 as cash.

With the two Americans still in the office Lowther excuses himself for a few minutes but leaves the building. Bob and Liz board a helicopter on a rooftop of the Panam Building near the Chrysler Building. Lowther joins just before it takes off.

A view of the Tower Bridge and the Thames tells us that we are now in London. Lowther discusses his past in the British Army. Lowther is married to Liz and Bob is his son by an earlier marriage.

In Africa with Maurice "Gee Gee" Gray (their next mark) Liz (now called Miss Smallwood) is introduced to Awana, who wants to buy guns. Lowther plots to give him scrap metal instead of guns. Lowther disguises himself as a brigadier and remembers his time at the Battle of El Alamein. Bob dresses as a corporal. They give Awana a demonstration of anti-tank guns.

We next see Awana gagged and in a crate. He is described as incompetent by All Lin, the real leader.

The dynamic of the trio changes when Bob steals a kiss from his step-mother.

Bob meets his friend Spider in the kitchens of the Carlton Hotel. Spider points out Spencer in the restaurant. He then invites Spencer to join his table on the next night. He introduces Lowther as Longbottom, his private secretary, while posing as Mr Appleyard. They start spending time together: golf, squash, billiards and clay pigeon shooting. He extorts £500,000 out of Spencer, who is led to believe he is getting a 20% commission in a £5 million deal in Lebanon. Lowther dresses as an Arab to try to seal the deal. Bob and Liz plot a two-way split, excluding Lowther.

In the Lebanon Bob and Liz meet Lowther and drive into the wilderness. They are carrying archaeological gear in case they are stopped. Lowther cons a Lebanese banker into letting him use his office to meet Spencer. When Spencer arrives, he has no cash. Spencer phones a Swiss bank to transfer the cash. Lowther collects the cash, but the banker stops him to explain his "only when I laugh" joke from the previous day. Lowther meets Spencer's wife outside and the two join Bob and Liz.

They drive to Umm Al Amad each trying to cheat the other. Ultimately Liz drives off with the cash alone leaving the others laughing.

== Cast ==
- Richard Attenborough as Silas Lowther
- David Hemmings as Bob
- Alexandra Stewart as Liz Mason
- Nicholas Pennell as Spencer
- Melissa Stribling as Diana
- Terence Alexander as Gee Gee Gray
- Edric Connor as Awana
- Clifton Jones as General Sakut
- Calvin Lockhart as Ali Lin
- Brian Grellis as Spider, head waiter at the Carlton
- David Healy as Jones
- Alan Gifford as Poster

== Critical reception ==
The Monthly Film Bulletin wrote: "Richard Attenborough gives a virtuoso performance as a conman capable of imitating anyone from Lawrence of Arabia to the popular conception of a psychiatrist, and David Hemmings has a few moderately entertaining lines about the Army being the classic con-trick. Apart from that, the film overflows with technically adept, tourist-type local colour; and a recurring joke about a man with a spear stuck in him who claims it hurts 'only when I larf' is a fair indication of the general level."

Vincent Canby wrote in The New York Times: "Beneath the surface sheen (the color photography and the décor are smashing) and the bright performances, there are hints of the existence of a real world. They can be seen in what is essentially the father-son rivalry between Attenborough and Hemmings, in the disguises they employ so easily in their work (and which, of course, are parts of their lives), and in man's primordial conviction in the perfidy of woman, at least, as represented by Miss Stewart. Dearden doesn't allow this sort of thing to change the basic shape of the movie, which might have been more interesting if he had.

Variety wrote: Only When I Larf is a pleasant little joke ... with sound, unfussy direction and witty, observed thesping. ... Talk is minimal, though the script opens up into a more gabby talk-fest later, but dialog is usually pointed and crisp. Attenborough plays an ex-brigadier and takes on various guises. His brigadier is a masterly piece of observation and the whole film has Attenborough at his considerable comedy best. Hemmings is equally effective as the discontented young whiz-kid lieutenant and Stewart, with little to do, manages to look both efficient and sexy.

Time Out wrote: "Richard Attenborough dons assorted disguises and is sometimes brilliant – notably as a manically jolly psychiatrist. Otherwise this is a plodding adaptation of Len Deighton's jokey novel about a trio of confidence tricksters (Attenborough, Hemmings, Stewart), which opens with a lengthy pre-credits sequence detailing their method of operation, repeats this twice over with variations, and ends on a note of hollow laughter."

The Radio Times Guide to Films gave the film 3/5 stars, writing: "The production, in several glamorous locations, is amusingly trendy, in Swinging Sixties style, and Attenborough give some of his most uninhibited comic performances."

Leslie Halliwell said: "Quite likeable but unmemorable 'with it' comedy of the sixties; the tricks are more amusing than the characterisation."
