= Attack on the Iron Coast =

1967 film by Paul Wendkos

- Original film poster by Frank McCarthy
- Directed by: Paul Wendkos
- Written by: Herman Hoffman; John C. Champion
- Produced by: John C. Champion
- Starring: Lloyd Bridges; Andrew Keir; Sue Lloyd; Mark Eden
- Cinematography: Paul Beeson
- Edited by: Ernest Hosler
- Music by: Gerard Schurmann
- Production companies: Oakmont Productions; Mirisch Productions
- Distributed by: United Artists
- Release dates: 1967 (UK); 5 June 1968 (US)
- Running time: 90
- Countries: United Kingdom; United States
- Language: English

Attack on the Iron Coast is a 1967 DeLuxe Color Anglo-American Oakmont Productions international co-production war film directed by Paul Wendkos in the first of his five-picture contract with Mirisch Productions, and starring Lloyd Bridges, Andrew Keir, Sue Lloyd, Mark Eden and Maurice Denham. The film depicts an account of Allied Combined Operations Headquarters commandos executing a daring raid on the German-occupied French coast during the Second World War. The plot is based on the commando raid on the French port of St. Nazaire and is reminiscent of the film The Gift Horse.

In the United States it was released as a double feature with Danger Route. In the UK it was released as a double bill with The Beatles' animated film Yellow Submarine.

== Plot ==
Canadian Commando Major Jamie Wilson plans an audacious Combined Operations raid on the Axis held French port of Le Clare; if destroyed, the Germans would be stripped of the only dry dock capable of servicing their large battleships. Wilson's plan, code named Operation Mad Dog, is to ram a destroyer packed with tons of explosives into the outer gate of the dock, while his commandos cause havoc to the dock facilities and garrison, and then detonate the explosive laden destroyer. Opposed to Wilson is Royal Navy Captain Owen Franklin, whose own son was killed on Wilson's disastrous previous Dieppe-type raid on the French coast at Le Plagé.

Under political pressure, Wilson's plan is given the go-ahead, even though the naval craft requested for the mission are reduced to a minesweeper replacing the destroyer, no escort craft and only four motor launches. The mission's naval commander, Lieutenant Commander Don Kimberly, is blinded in a training accident while trying to save an injured commando, who dies from his injuries. With no other option, Franklin is ordered to replace Kimberly and is thus put in direct conflict with Wilson on the journey to France. After an attack by a night fighter delays their return to base course, Wilson is surprised to learn that Franklin had suggested they minesweep the area in the weeks before the mission, so the Germans believe it to be just routine. As they cross the English Channel Wilson finds himself at odds with Franklin when the supporting air raid seems to be cancelled, but, to Wilson's surprise, Franklin ignores the order to return and changes his view of both Wilson and the mission.

With a united group heading into the port, the Germans discover the approaching minesweeper and its commando carrying escort of motor launches. After briefly stalling the Germans by pretending they are German ships, the convoy is bombarded by the coastal batteries which line the port entrance but fail to stop the minesweeper from ramming the dock gate. As the commando's storm ashore, leaving Wilson on the minesweeper's bridge, it is hit once again, this time with Wilson mortally wounded. In the port's facilities a running battle rages between the Germans and the commandos, in which Franklin is captured and taken to the German HQ.

Brought in front of the garrison commander, Colonel von Horst, Franklin is mocked for what the Germans see as a fruitless mission. Meanwhile, a German party, led by von Horst's subordinate, Captain Erich Strasser, boards the minesweeper and heads for the smashed bridge where Wilson, barely alive, notices that the detonating circuit is broken. As Strasser enters the bridge, Wilson, with his last ounce of strength (and just as Strasser fires at him) places the two wires together, completing the circuit; the explosives detonate, destroying the dock gate. In the German HQ, Franklin grins at the Germans' reactions as the explosion rocks the building, and just then commandos storm the HQ and liberate him, killing von Horst and his men. Franklin and the commandos depart in the waiting motor launches; their mission completed.

== Cast ==
- Lloyd Bridges as Major James Wilson
- Andrew Keir as Captain Owen Franklin
- Sue Lloyd as Sue Wilson
- Mark Eden as Lieutenant Commander Donald Kimberly
- Maurice Denham as Rear Admiral Sir Frederick Grafton
- Glyn Owen as Forrester
- Howard Pays as Lieutenant Graham
- Walter Gotell as Col. von Horst
- John Welsh as Admiral of the Fleet Lord William Cansley
- George Mikell as Capt. Erich Strasser
- Ernest Clark as Air Vice Marshal Woodbridge

== Production ==
Encouraged by the worldwide success of 633 Squadron (1964), producer Walter Mirisch proposed a series of British-made films with a military theme having major American stars in the lead that would comply with the Eady Levy requirements and cost no more than US$1 million. This film was the first of the series of John C. Champion's Oakmont Productions and began shooting 15 May 1967. The others were Submarine X-1, Hell Boats, Mosquito Squadron, The Thousand Plane Raid and The Last Escape. Each of the films was approximately 90 minutes long, making them suitable for half of a double feature and had a Hollywood star leading the cast.

The film was shot at MGM-British Studios Borehamwood, Gaddesden Place Hertfordshire and Millwall Dock, St Katharine Docks and the London Docklands with special effects by the Bowie Organisation.

== Soundtrack ==
Composer Gerard Schurmann used his score as the basis of a 1971 concert work called Attack and Celebration. As with the other Oakmount films, portions of Ron Goodwin's score for 633 Squadron are reused.

== Reception ==
Howard Thompson of The New York Times called it "Pretty familiar, yes, but, still pretty good."
