= Nicholas Pennell =

British actor

- Born: Nicholas Follett Croker Pennell; 19 November 1938; Brixham, Devon, England, UK
- Died: 22 February 1995 (aged 56); Stratford, Ontario, Canada
- Occupation: Actor

Nicholas Pennell (19 November 1938 – 22 February 1995) was an English actor who appeared frequently on film and television in the 1960s. He emigrated to Stratford, Ontario, Canada, where he became a stalwart of the Stratford Festival.

Pennell was educated at Allhallows College, Lyme Regis, and trained at RADA. He then appeared in repertory theatre. On television he appeared in The Saint, The Flaxton Boys, The Forsyte Saga as Michael Mont, and in six episodes of Doctor Who entitled Colony in Space.

On film he appeared as Bedford in Isadora (1968), in Only When I Larf (1968) as Spencer, an RAF pilot in Battle of Britain (1969), and as Julien in Mr. Forbush and the Penguins (1971).

In 1972, he joined the Stratford Festival company upon the urging of William Hutt. In his first season, he appeared as Orlando in As You Like It opposite Carole Shelley as Rosalind. The following year he returned to star as Pericles in 1973 in a production designed by Leslie Hurry and directed by Jean Gascon.

When Robin Phillips became artistic director in 1975, he found a familiar face. The two had worked together in the 1969 TV film of David Copperfield, and Phillips too was also in The Forsyte Saga. Phillips recruited Pennell to join his young company and perform in The Comedy of Errors and The Two Gentlemen of Verona. 1976 brought Hamlet and Ariel in The Tempest. He often said he worshipped Phillips as an actor.

Pennell became a leading member of the Stratford Festival company and passionate about the festival. Acting Shakespeare became his vocation. He was a generous company member, speaking to student groups and mentoring young actors. In 23 seasons he played a wide range of characters from Stephano in The Tempest, Iago, Richard II, the Fool in Lear, Sassoon in Not About Heroes to King John.

He can be seen on DVD in the role of Malvolio in a production of Shakespeare's Twelfth Night (1986) CBC Home Video, Canadian Broadcasting Corporation, based on the 1985 Stratford Shakespeare Festival production.

Pennell died on 22 February 1995, of lymphatic cancer, at the age of 56.

Little is known about Pennell's private life. A biography was published in 2005 by Mary Z. Maher, which leaves unanswered questions about what he was like off-stage in public and in private, what drove him into a gloomy reclusiveness during his final years, and how his homosexuality might have influenced his acting and his life.

== Filmography ==
Year	Title	Role	Notes
1964	The Vortex	Nicky	(television adaptation)
1968	Only When I Larf	Spencer	
1968	Isadora	Bedford	
1969	Battle of Britain	Simon	
1971	Mr. Forbush and the Penguins	Julien	
1994	Satie and Suzanne	Erik Satie	(final film role)
