= Brian Grellis =

British actor

Brian Grellis is a British actor, from Liverpool, best known for his role in the television series Z-Cars as Det. Sgt. Bowker. He was born on 12 July 1937, as Brian McGrellis, being billed as such in his first role, in the Edgar Wallace Mysteries.

Other TV credits include: Softly, Softly, Pathfinders, The Regiment, Whatever Happened to the Likely Lads?, The Onedin Line, The Good Life, Last of the Summer Wine, Survivors, Enemy at the Door, Doctor Who (in the serials Revenge of the Cybermen, The Invisible Enemy and Snakedance), The Gentle Touch, Minder, Bergerac and Threads.

Grellis is also known for his role as Phidian, the aide to Sir Hilary Bray in the 1969 James Bond film On Her Majesty's Secret Service. Originally, this part was slated to be much larger, with a long chase scene involving Phidian after being revealed as a mole of the film's villain, but this was scrapped partway through filming of the sequence due to budgetary restrictions, leaving Grellis with one line of dialogue and less than fifteen seconds of screentime in the finished film. His other film credits included appearances in Only When I Larf (1968), Submarine X-1 (1968), Battle of Britain (1969), Trog (1970) and Fear in the Night (1972).

== Partial filmography ==
- Edgar Wallace Mysteries (1963) – Delivery Boy - ('The Double', Episode)
- Submarine X-1 (1968) – C.P.O. Barquist
- Only When I Larf (1968) – Spider
- Mosquito Squadron (1969) – Pilot Officer (uncredited)
- Battle of Britain (1969) – RAF Cpl. Ernie (uncredited)
- On Her Majesty's Secret Service (1969) – Aide to Sir Hilary Bray (uncredited)
- Trog (1970) – John Dennis (uncredited)
- Fear in the Night (1972) – 2nd Policeman
- The Offence (1973) – Policeman Posing as Workman by the School (uncredited)
