= Woman Obsessed =

1959 film by Henry Hathaway

- Theatrical release poster
- Directed by: Henry Hathaway
- Screenplay by: Sydney Boehm
- Based on: The Snow Birch (1958 novel) by John Mantley
- Produced by: Sydney Boehm
- Starring: Susan Hayward; Stephen Boyd; Barbara Nichols; Dennis Holmes; Theodore Bikel; Ken Scott; James Philbrook; Florence MacMichael
- Cinematography: William C. Mellor; Leon Shamroy
- Edited by: Robert L. Simpson
- Music by: Hugo Friedhofer
- Distributed by: 20th Century-Fox
- Release date: May 27, 1959
- Running time: 102 minutes
- Country: United States
- Language: English
- Budget: $1.7 million
- Box office: $1.3 million (est. US/Canada rentals)

Woman Obsessed is a 1959 American romantic drama film directed by Henry Hathaway and starring Susan Hayward, Stephen Boyd, Barbara Nichols, Dennis Holmes, Theodore Bikel, Ken Scott, James Philbrook, and Florence MacMichael. The screenplay concerns the hardships faced by a widow and her eight-year-old son on a rugged Canadian ranch.

== Plot ==
Mary Sharron (Susan Hayward) has lost her husband to a forest fire. To help her run the ranch, she hires handyman Fred Carter (Stephen Boyd). A handsome, but taciturn man who has known much tragedy, Fred works hard for her. Robbie Sharron (Dennis Holmes), the woman's son, resents Fred, and when he learns that his mother is planning to marry him to quell ugly rumors in town, the youth is unhappy. After the wedding, the stepfather treats the boy harshly, not out of cruelty, but because he wants to prepare the boy to survive the tough life ahead. This creates friction and frustration. Sometimes Fred beats both Mary and Robbie. On the day that Mary learns she is pregnant, Robbie and Fred get into a violent fight.

Fred goes to the local saloon and ends up jailed for brawling. A month later he is released. When he gets home, he finds Mary has moved his things to the barn. A natural disaster changes the family's lives and relationships, and after much turmoil, honesty and pain gives them a chance to heal and start anew.

== Cast ==
- Susan Hayward as Mary Sharron
- Stephen Boyd as Fred Carter
- Barbara Nichols as Mayme Radzevitch
- Dennis Holmes as Mary's son, Robbie Sharron
- Theodore Bikel as Dr. R. W. Gibbs
- Ken Scott as Sergeant Le Moyne
- James Philbrook as Henri

== Production ==
Although Woman Obsessed is not a musical film, in addition to Hugo Friedhofer, nine additional top-name musicians were involved in the creation of the score. They include Earle Hagen, orchestrator; Lionel Newman, conductor; David Buttolph, Leigh Harline and Alfred Newman, composers of additional music; and Alexander Courage, Gus Levene, Arthur Morton and Edward B. Powell, orchestrators.

The film was shot in Big Bear Lake, California.

== Reception ==
Writing in The New York Times, reviewer Bosley Crowther panned the film: "Perhaps we should not blame Miss Hayward or the fellow who plays the husband, Stephen Boyd, for faults that should be laid to the director, Henry Hathaway, or particular to Mr. Boehm. (The latter also produced the picture, so he is liable to double jeopardy.) But their efforts are so clearly indifferent and wanting in basic skill that they are deserving serious censure for such an utterly foolish film."
