= High Plains Drifter =

1973 film by Clint Eastwood

- Theatrical release poster by Ron Lesser
- Directed by: Clint Eastwood
- Written by: Ernest Tidyman
- Produced by: Robert Daley
- Starring: Clint Eastwood; Verna Bloom; Mariana Hill
- Cinematography: Bruce Surtees
- Edited by: Ferris Webster
- Music by: Dee Barton
- Production company: The Malpaso Company
- Distributed by: Universal Pictures
- Release date: April 6, 1973 (United States)
- Running time: 105 minutes
- Country: United States
- Language: English
- Budget: $5.5 million
- Box office: $15.7 million

High Plains Drifter is a 1973 American Western film directed by Clint Eastwood, written by Ernest Tidyman, and produced by Robert Daley for The Malpaso Company and Universal Pictures. The film stars Eastwood as a mysterious stranger who metes out justice in a corrupt frontier mining town. The film was influenced by the work of Eastwood's collaborators, the film directors Sergio Leone and Don Siegel. The film co-stars Verna Bloom, Mariana Hill, Mitchell Ryan, Jack Ging and Stefan Gierasch.

The film was shot on location on the southern shores of Mono Lake, California. Dee Barton wrote the film score. The film was critically acclaimed at the time of its initial release and remains popular.

== Plot ==
A mysterious, unnamed stranger rides out of the desert into the isolated mining town of Lago in the American Old West. He jerks upon hearing the sound of a horse whip from a passing buckboard. While sitting for a shave in a barber’s chair, three gunmen hired to protect the town taunt and threaten him; he kills all three with little effort. When the attractive, blonde townswoman Callie Travers flirtatiously insults him, he rapes her in the livery stable. That night, in his hotel room, the Stranger dreams of Jim Duncan, a U.S. Marshal, being whipped to death by outlaws Stacey Bridges and his cousins, brothers Dan and Cole Carlin, as Lago's citizens watch in silence.

The next day, Callie, evidently upset by the rape, shoots at the Stranger while he is bathing. Though the shots appear accurate, the Stranger emerges uninjured. Lago's town council, needing to replace the three gunmen, offer the Stranger anything he wants to protect the town from Bridges and the Carlins, who will soon be released from prison. It is gradually revealed that the townspeople hired the outlaws to murder Duncan when he discovered that the local gold mine was illegally dug on government-owned land and would have to be closed, destroying the town's livelihood. The townspeople then conspired to frame the outlaws for stealing gold as a means to avoid paying them, and the outlaws have vowed revenge.

The Stranger accepts the job and takes full advantage of the deal: he appoints a downtrodden dwarf named Mordecai as both sheriff and mayor, provides a Native American and his children with blankets and candy when the shopkeeper and town mayor Hobart refuses to serve them, gets a new saddle and boots, and forces the saloon to serve everyone free drinks. He later orders hotel owners, Lewis and Sarah Belding, and all the other guests to vacate the premises, leaving himself as its sole occupant.

Callie and several men, including her lover, corrupt mining official, Morgan "Morg" Allen, decide to kill the Stranger. After having sex with him in his room, Callie slips out as Morgan and several men enter. As they unknowingly beat a dummy in the bed, the Stranger tosses a stick of dynamite into the room, destroying most of the hotel, killing two men. He then shoots two of his attackers dead outside, as Morgan flees, wounded. Corrupt mining boss, Dave Drake and town leader, offers The Stranger more money to stay, much to Lewis' dismay as he conspired with Morgan to ambush the Stranger. The Stranger then drags Sarah, kicking and screaming, into her bedroom (the only room in the hotel not damaged) where the two have sex after he taunts her by saying he is too tired to assault her. The next morning, Sarah tells the Stranger that Duncan cannot rest in peace because the townspeople buried him in an unmarked grave and warns him to be careful all while bring feared. Lewis returns to the hotel only to find Sarah packing her belongings, she explains that she's divorcing him for his corruption and involvement with Duncan's death.

The Stranger assembles a group of citizens to defend the town and has them practice shooting, but soon realizes that none has the necessary skills. To keep the townspeople occupied, he orders every building in town painted blood red. He then rides out of town without explanation, following the wounded Morgan. Before he leaves, he paints over the town sign with a single word: "Hell".

The Stranger finds Bridges and the Carlins, who have just finished off Morgan, and harasses them with dynamite and rifle fire, leading the outlaws to believe the townspeople are responsible. Returning to Lago, the Stranger inspects the preparations—the entire town painted red, armed men on rooftops, picnic tables laden with food and drink, and a big "Welcome Home Boys" banner—then he silently departs again. The outlaws arrive and easily overcome the poor resistance of the townspeople; Drake and a few townspeople are killed, while the survivors are rounded up in the saloon.

The Stranger lures Cole outside and whips him to death, then kills Dan by hanging him. Bridges is then shot by the Stranger before asking: "Who are you!" The Stranger doesn't reply and shoots Bridges dead. Lewis, aiming a shotgun at the Stranger's back, is shot dead by Mordecai. The next morning, the Stranger rides past Mordecai in the cemetery. Mordecai says: "I never did know your name." The Stranger replies: "Yes, you do." As the Stranger rides off into the desert, a perplexed Mordecai stands beside the wooden tombstone he had just finished carving: "Marshal Jim Duncan, Rest in Peace."

== Cast ==
- Clint Eastwood as The Stranger
- Verna Bloom as Sarah Belding
- Mariana Hill as Callie Travers
- Billy Curtis as Mordecai
- Mitchell Ryan as Dave Drake
- Jack Ging as Morgan Allen
- Stefan Gierasch as Mayor Jason Hobart
- Ted Hartley as Lewis Belding
- Geoffrey Lewis as Stacey Bridges
- Dan Vadis as Dan Carlin
- Anthony James as Cole Carlin
- Walter Barnes as Sheriff Sam Shaw
- Paul Brinegar as Lutie Naylor
- Richard Bull as Asa Goodwin
- Robert Donner as Preacher
- John Hillerman as Bootmaker
- John Quade as Freight Wagon Operator
- Buddy Van Horn as Marshal Jim Duncan
- William O'Connell as the Barber
- Reid Cruickshank as the Gunsmith
- James Gosa as Tommy Morris
- Derek Timpson as Donny Joy
- Scott Walker as Billy Borders
- Russ McCubbin as Fred Short

== Production ==
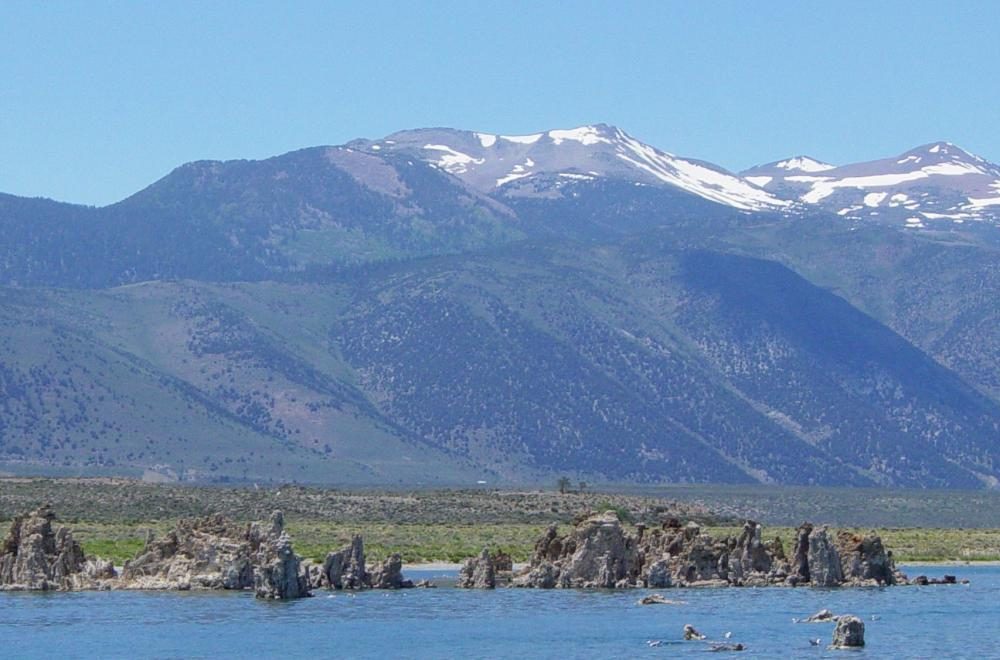
Mono Lake in California

Eastwood reportedly liked the offbeat quality of the film's original nine-page treatment and approached Universal with the idea of directing it. It is the first Western film that he both directed and starred in. Under a joint production between Malpaso and Universal, the original screenplay was written by Ernest Tidyman, who had won a Best Screenplay Oscar for The French Connection.

Tidyman's screenplay was inspired by the real-life murder of Kitty Genovese in Queens in 1964, which eyewitnesses reportedly stood by and watched. Holes in the plot were filled in with black humor and allegory, influenced by Sergio Leone. An uncredited rewrite of the script was provided by Dean Riesner, screenwriter of other Eastwood projects.

Universal wanted Eastwood to shoot the feature on its back lot, but Eastwood opted instead to film on location. After scouting locations alone in a pickup truck in Oregon, Nevada and California, he settled on the "highly photogenic" Mono Lake area. Over 50 technicians and construction workers built an entire town—14 houses, a church, and a two-story hotel—in 18 days, using 150,000 feet (45,720 meters) of lumber.

Complete buildings, rather than facades, were built, so that Eastwood could shoot interior scenes on the site. Additional scenes were filmed at Reno, Nevada's Winnemucca Lake and California's Inyo National Forest. The film was completed in six weeks, two days ahead of schedule, and under budget.

The character of Marshal Duncan was played by Buddy Van Horn, Eastwood's long-time stunt double, to suggest that he and the Stranger could be the same person. In an interview, Eastwood said that earlier versions of the script made the Stranger the dead marshal's brother. He favored a less explicit and more supernatural interpretation, and excised the reference. The Italian, Spanish, French and German dubbings restored it.

"It's just an allegory," Eastwood said, "a speculation on what happens when they go ahead and kill the sheriff, and somebody comes back and calls the town's conscience to bear. There's always retribution for your deeds." The graveyard set featured in the film's final scene included tombstones inscribed "Sergio Leone" and "Don Siegel" as a humorous tribute to the two influential directors.

The 'ghost story' interpretation of the film favoured by Eastwood is hinted at strongly throughout the movie, suggesting that the Stranger may be the ghost of slain Federal Marshal Jim Duncan, returning for vengeance and justice; the beginning and end of the film sees the Stranger mysteriously emerge, apparition-like, as he rides into and out of Lago through a shimmering heat-haze. Upon arriving, the Stranger has a lucid and graphic dream about Jim Duncan's death, in which Duncan declares damnation upon the townspeople for not saving his life. The Stranger's instructions that all buildings should be painted red and the town's name of Lago be replaced by a sign labelled 'HELL' echoes Duncan's dying words that the residents would suffer in Hell for failing to prevent his death. After spending a night in a hotel bed together, Sarah Belding tells the Stranger of her belief that Jim Duncan cannot rest in peace nor depart the physical realm because he was buried in an unmarked grave. Then, upon the Stranger's final departure from Lago, the dwarf Mordecai is seen tending to an unmarked grave which now bears the name Jim Duncan.

== Reception ==
Universal released High Plains Drifter in the United States in April 1973, and the film eventually grossed $15.7 million domestically, ultimately making it the sixth-highest grossing Western in North America of the 1970s and the 20th highest-grossing film of 1973. The film was well received by many critics, and rates 91% positive on Rotten Tomatoes based on 33 reviews with a mean of 7.7 of a possible 10. On Metacritic the film has a score 69% based on reviews from 10 critics, indicating "generally favorable" reviews.

Vincent Canby of The New York Times called the film "part ghost story, part revenge Western, more than a little silly, and often quite entertaining in a way that may make you wonder if you lost your good sense". Gene Siskel of the Chicago Tribune gave the film 3 stars out of 4 and wrote, "What does work very well indeed is Eastwood's presence, personal style, and direction. Though his laconic sense of humor often drags out the pacing of the movie, Eastwood uses his camera with intelligence and flair." Arthur D. Murphy of Variety called it "a nervously humorous, self-conscious near satire on the prototype Clint Eastwood formula of the avenging mysterious stranger. Ernest Tidyman's script has some raw violence for the kinks, some dumb humor for audience relief, and lots of arch characterizations befitting the serio-comic-strip nature of the plot."

Kevin Thomas of the Los Angeles Times called it: "a stylized, allegorical western of much chillingly paranoid atmosphere and considerable sardonic humor that confirms Eastwood's directorial flair. It's also a pretty violent business that won't disappoint the millions who flocked to the Leone westerns." Tom Zito of The Washington Post called it "an enjoyable, well-constructed work that suffers only from a slightly tedious tone that makes the film seem longer than its 105 minutes."

The film had its share of detractors. Some critics thought Eastwood's directing derivative; Arthur Knight in Saturday Review remarked that Eastwood had "absorbed the approaches of Siegel and Leone and fused them with his own paranoid vision of society". Jon Landau of Rolling Stone concurred, noting "thematic shallowness" and "verbal archness"; but he expressed approval of the dramatic scenery and cinematography. Nigel Andrews of The Monthly Film Bulletin wrote that "after Play Misty For Me, High Plains Drifter emerges as a disappointingly sterile exercise in style, suggesting that the first thing Eastwood should do as a director is forget the lessons he has learned from other film-makers and start to forge a convincing style of his own." John Wayne criticized the film's iconoclastic approach; in a letter to Eastwood, he wrote: "That isn't what the West was all about. That isn't the American people who settled this country." The film was recognized by American Film Institute in 2008 on AFI's 10 Top 10 in the category "Nominated Western Film".

== Home media ==
High Plains Drifter was first released on DVD by Universal Studios Home Video on February 24, 1998. It made its Blu-ray debut on October 15, 2013, by Universal Studios, with a 4K scan of the original camera negative along with a new 5.1 audio track. It was reissued on Blu-ray on October 27, 2020, by Kino Lorber with commentary tracks and new interviews but uses the same 2013 transfer. On November 22, 2022, it was released on 4K UHD by Kino Lorber with a newly remastered 4K transfer, but with the same special features as their 2020 release. A minor controversy occurred, as a result of them choosing to leave off the original theatrical mono mix, as they did with their 2020 release, instead having a stereo downmix of the 5.1 track.

== See also ==
- List of American films of 1973
- Pale Rider
- Weird West

== Bibliography ==
- Cornell, Drucilla (2009). Clint Eastwood and Issues of American Masculinity. New York: Fordham University Press. ISBN 9780823230143.
- Eliot, Marc (2009). American Rebel: The Life of Clint Eastwood. Harmony Books. ISBN 9780307336880.
- Gentry, Ric (1999). "Director Clint Eastwood: Attention to Detail and Involvement for the Audience". In Robert E., Kapsis; Coblentz, Kathie (eds.). Clint Eastwood: Interviews. University Press of Mississippi. pp. 62–75. ISBN 1578060702.
- Girgus, Sam (2014). "An American Journey: Issues and Themes". Clint Eastwood's America. New York, NY: John Wiley & Sons. ISBN 9780745656489.
- Green, Philip (1998). Cracks in the Pedestal Ideology and Gender in Hollywood. Amherst: University of Massachusetts Press. ISBN 1558491201.
- Heller-Nicholas, Alexandra (2011). Rape-Revenge Films: A Critical Study. Jefferson, N.C: McFarland. ISBN 9780786449613.
- Hughes, Howard (2009). Aim for the Heart. I.B. Tauris. ISBN 9781845119027.
- McGilligan, Patrick (1999). Clint: The Life and Legend. HarperCollins. ISBN 0006383548.
- Ruffles, Tom (2004). Ghost Images: Cinema of the Afterlife. Jefferson, N.C: McFarland & Co. ISBN 0786484217.
- White, Mike (2013). Cinema Detours. Morrisville: Lulu.com. ISBN 9781300981176.
- Guérif, François (1986). Clint Eastwood, p. 94. St Martins Pr. ISB
