= Dennis Holmes =

American film and television actor

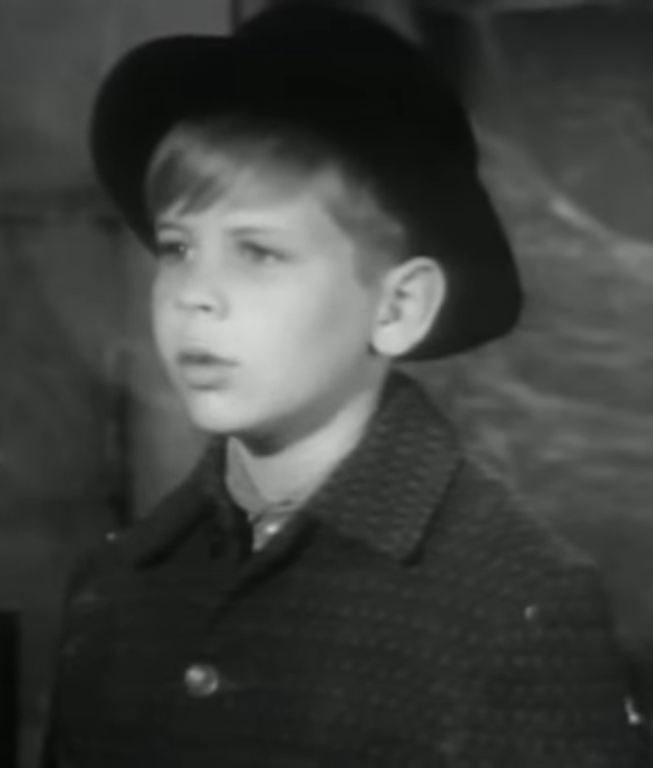
- Holmes in The Deputy, 1961
- Born: Charles Dennis Holmes; October 3, 1950 (age 75); Encino, California, U.S.
- Occupations: Film and television actor
- Years active: 1954–1964
- Spouse: Janet Smith (m. 1981)

Charles Dennis Holmes (born October 3, 1950) is an American film and television actor. He is best known for playing Mike Williams in the American western television series Laramie.

== Life and career ==
Holmes was born in Encino, California. He began his screen career in 1951, appearing in the film Operation Pacific. He made his television debut in 1954, appearing in the CBS television series The Jack Benny Program. From 1958 and 1961, he appeared in the films Hound-Dog Man, Violent Road, The Fiercest Heart, Key Witness and Woman Obsessed.

Later in his career, Holmes joined the cast of the NBC western television series Laramie in 1961, first appearing in the episode "Dragon at the Door" in the series's third season, playing Mike Williams. He guest-starred in television programs including The Andy Griffith Show, The Adventures of Ozzie and Harriet, The Deputy, 77 Sunset Strip and The Virginian.

Holmes retired from acting in 1964, last appearing in the ABC western television series Wagon Train. After retiring from acting, he worked as a technology specialist in California.
