= John C. Champion =

American screenwriter and film producer (1923–1994)

- Born: October 13, 1923; Denver, Colorado, U.S.
- Died: October 10, 1994 (aged 70); Los Angeles, California, U.S.
- Occupations: Producer; screenwriter

John C. Champion (October 13, 1923 in Denver, Colorado, United States – October 10, 1994 in Tarzana, California, US) was an American producer and screenwriter.

== Biography ==
John C. Champion's first films were two Westerns that he produced and co-wrote with Blake Edwards. Panhandle (1948) and Stampede (1949) were both directed by Lesley Selander for Allied Artists. He later worked again with Selander as producer and screenwriter on another western, Shotgun, and the Korean War film Dragonfly Squadron. Champion produced and co-wrote with Arthur Hailey the aviation film Zero Hour! that was remade as the comedy Airplane!.

In 1959 Champion produced the Western TV series Laramie and wrote several episodes in the series that ran until 1963. He wrote the original serious one hour pilot of McHale's Navy called Seven Against the Sea. In 1965 he formed a company with Audie Murphy, M.C.R. Productions to produce Westerns in Spain, but only one, The Texican was made.

He moved to England in 1967 where he wrote and produced low budget war films for Mirisch Films GB such as Attack on the Iron Coast, The Last Escape, and Submarine X-1. Like Dragonfly Squadron, the low-budget films made by Oakmont Productions featured large amounts of stock footage and were made with American leads and directors.

Champion wrote one novel The Hawks of Noon (1965). In 1969 Rod Taylor announced that he would star in a film of the book and have a multi-picture deal with Champion, but no films were made.

Champion's final film was Mustang Country in 1976 with Joel McCrea that Champion directed, produced and wrote.
