= Stampede (1949 film) =

1949 film by Lesley Selander

- Directed by: Lesley Selander
- Screenplay by: John C. Champion; Blake Edwards
- Based on: Stampede; 1934 novel by Edward Beverly Mann
- Produced by: John C. Champion; Blake Edwards
- Starring: Rod Cameron; Gale Storm; Johnny Mack Brown; Don Castle; Donald Curtis; John Miljan
- Cinematography: Harry Neumann
- Edited by: Richard V. Heermance
- Music by: Edward J. Kay
- Production company: Allied Artists Pictures
- Distributed by: Allied Artists Pictures
- Release date: May 1, 1949
- Running time: 77 minutes
- Country: United States
- Language: English

Stampede is a 1949 American Western film directed by Lesley Selander and starring Rod Cameron, Gale Storm, Johnny Mack Brown and Don Castle.

== Plot ==
Two brothers, Mike McCall and Tim McCall, own a large cattle ranch situated in a valley in Arizona. Back when their father built the ranch, he dammed the river on their property to create Spirit Lake, and thus the McCalls control all the water in the valley. The land surrounding the ranch belongs to business partners Leroy Stanton and Stanley Cox, who begin selling it to various settlers from Indiana and Illinois. However, when the settlers arrive, they find the land bone dry because of the dam, and their discontent jeopardizes Stanton and Cox's larger plans to profit from the development of the local town, where they also own most of the land. Settler John Dawson and his daughter Connie Dawson complain to Sheriff Aaron Ball about the water situation, but he has no legal remedy. Connie strongly resents the McCalls despite her peaceable father's desire to get along with his neighbors, but over time, a romance kindles between her and Tim.

Meanwhile, Stanton plots to ruin the McCalls. First, he has his henchmen rob the local bank, and then he deposits the stolen money back into the bank to keep it financially afloat and gain leverage over its owner, T.J. Furman. Next, he intends to stampede the McCalls' cattle herd and blow up the Spirit Lake dam, wiping out the McCalls' only source of income and restoring water flow in the valley. With that accomplished, Stanton would then compel Furman to call in a $30,000 loan that the McCalls took out at his bank, which would bankrupt them. Certain settlers, upset with the McCalls' monopoly over water, willingly assist in Stanton's scheme and also try to catch the McCalls afoul of the law.

One evening, Stanton's henchmen are setting up the dynamite along the dam when Tim stumbles across them, resulting in Tim being murdered. Mike and Connie grieve and find consolation in each other. Later, Furman overhears Stanton discussing the imminent destruction of the McCall ranch. He is overcome by guilt in his role in betraying Mike and goes to the bar to drink, where he hints about the conspiracy to his friend Steve Varick. Stanton suspects Furman is losing his resolve and has him killed, but Varick tells Sheriff Ball about what Furman said. Ball deduces what Stanton is up to and alerts Mike, but they are too late to stop the McCall cattle from being stampeded off a cliff to their deaths by Stanton's men. Mike reaches the dam just as Stanton is about to detonate the dynamite. They struggle in the water until Mike knocks Stanton out and leaves him to drown. As Mike looks upon Spirit Lake with Connie, he realizes that he never would have lost his brother or his cattle if the river had been left alone. He destroys the dam and releases the river himself, then pledges to start a new life in the valley with Connie.

== Cast ==
- Rod Cameron as Mike McCall
- Gale Storm as Connie Dawson
- Johnny Mack Brown as Sheriff Aaron Ball
- Don Castle as Tim McCall
- Donald Curtis as Leroy Stanton
- John Miljan as T.J. Furman
- Jonathan Hale as Steve Varick
- John Eldredge as Cox
- Adrian Wood as Whiskey
- Wes C. Christiansen as Slim
- James Harrison as Roper
- Duke York as Maxie
- Steve Clark as John Dawson
- I. Stanford Jolley as Link Spain
- Marshall Reed as Henchman Shives
- Philo McCullough as Charlie - Restaurant Proprietor
