= Laramie (TV series) =

American Western television series (1959–1963)

- Laramie DVD cover
- Genre: Western
- Directed by: Earl Bellamy; Thomas Carr; Herschel Daugherty; Tay Garnett; Jesse Hibbs; Herman Hoffman; Joseph Kane; Francis D. Lyon; Hollingsworth Morse; Lesley Selander; William Witney
- Starring: John Smith; Robert Fuller; Hoagy Carmichael; Stuart Randall; Eddy Waller; Robert Crawford Jr.; Dennis Holmes; Spring Byington
- Composers: David Buttolph; Cyril J. Mockridge; Arthur Morton; Milton Rosen; Hans J. Salter; Albert Richard Sendrey; Harry Sukman
- Country of origin: United States
- Original language: English
- No. of seasons: 4
- No. of episodes: 124 (list of episodes)

Production
- Executive producer: John C. Champion
- Producer: Revue Studios
- Running time: 60 minutes
- Production company: Revue Studios

Original release
- Network: NBC
- Release: September 15, 1959 – May 21, 1963

Laramie is an American Western television series that aired on NBC from September 15, 1959, to May 21, 1963. A Revue Studios production, the series starred John Smith as Slim Sherman, owner of the Sherman Ranch; Robert L. Crawford Jr. as Andy, Slim's younger brother; Robert Fuller as Jess Harper, a hot-headed drifter who arrives at the Sherman Ranch in the premiere episode; and Hoagy Carmichael as Jonesy, who keeps the homestead and stage stop running. Actress Spring Byington was later added to the cast. Laramie is set in Wyoming.

== Plot ==
The Sherman brothers and drifter Jess Harper come together to run a stagecoach stop for the Great Central Overland Mail Company after the family patriarch, Matt Sherman, is murdered by a greedy land seeker. The Sherman parents are buried on the ranch. Near the end of the series, Matt Sherman is revealed to have been falsely accused during the American Civil War of having aided the Confederates. After Jess Harper discovers on Sherman Ranch land the wreckage of a Union Army gold wagon stolen by Confederate raiders, Slim sets out with the officer accused of aiding the Confederates, portrayed by Frank Overton, and an Army major — the real culprit, played by John Hoyt — to clear Matt Sherman's name. The gold dust had long since been scattered by the wind.

Subsequent episodes focus on the close friendship that develops between Slim and Jess, who become like brothers despite occasional strong differences of opinion, always finding reconciliation and common ground. Slim, who is taller than Jess and two years older, is generally depicted as the more level-headed and thoughtful of the two, while Jess is more emotional, prone to righteous indignation and difficulty controlling his temper.

=== Notable episodes ===
The series premiere, "Stage Stop" (September 15, 1959), filmed in color, explains how Slim Sherman and Jess Harper become partners in the Sherman Ranch and Relay Station. Jess arrives in Wyoming from Texas in search of a former "friend," Pete Morgan, played by John Mitchum, who had robbed him. Morgan is part of the gang of Bud Carlin (Dan Duryea). The gang captures Judge Thomas J. Wilkens (Everett Sloane) to prevent him from trying Morgan. Though Jess and Slim are initially at odds, Andy Sherman takes an instant liking to Jess and even asks him to take him away from the ranch. When Carlin shows up at the relay station and proceeds to humiliate the judge, Slim and Jess are forced to fight together.

In "The General Must Die" (November 17, 1959), Brian Keith appears as Whit Malone, an old friend of Slim's from the Union Army. Malone and a mentally troubled Colonel Brandon, again played by John Hoyt, arrive at the relay station with a foiled plan to assassinate General William Tecumseh Sherman, who is scheduled to pass through on a stagecoach. Gilman Rankin makes a cameo appearance as General Sherman. The episode reveals that Slim Sherman entered the Army as a private, rose to second lieutenant, and served under General Sherman (no relation) during the March to the Sea in Georgia.

In "Cactus Lady" (February 21, 1961), it is revealed that Jess Harper had nearly been hanged by mistake in the border city of Laredo, Texas, because of the McCanles gang, played by Arthur Hunnicutt, L. Q. Jones, Harry Dean Stanton, and Anita Sands, who arrive suddenly in Laramie.

== Cast ==
=== Main cast ===
- John Smith as Slim Sherman
- Robert Fuller as Jess Harper
- Robert L. Crawford Jr. as Andy Sherman (1959–1960)
- Hoagy Carmichael as Jonesy (1959–1960)
- Spring Byington as Daisy Cooper (1961–1963)
- Dennis Holmes as Mike Williams (1961–1963)
- Stuart Randall as Sheriff Mort Cory (1961–1963)
- Eddy Waller as Mose Shell, a stagecoach driver (19 episodes, 1959–1962)

=== Notable guest stars ===
- Claude Akins
- Rico Alaniz
- Eddie Albert
- Chris Alcaide
- John Anderson
- Robert Anderson
- Anna-Lisa
- R. G. Armstrong
- Robert Armstrong
- Brian Avery
- Phyllis Avery
- Lew Ayres
- Roy Barcroft
- Joanna Barnes
- Rayford Barnes
- Baynes Barron
- Don Beddoe
- Russ Bender
- Bruce Bennett
- James Best
- Lyle Bettger
- Brian Blessed
- Ernest Borgnine
- Robert Bray
- Charles Bronson
- James Brown
- Kathie Browne
- William Bryant
- Edgar Buchanan
- Julian Burton
- Jean Byron
- Rod Cameron
- Spencer Chan
- James Chandler
- James Coburn
- Fred Coby
- Pat Conway
- Russ Conway
- Richard H. Cutting
- Christopher Dark
- Jim Davis
- John Dehner
- Frank De Kova
- Kem Dibbs
- Tex Driscoll
- Dan Duryea
- Ross Elliott
- Robert Emhardt
- Jena Engstrom
- Nanette Fabray
- William Fawcett
- Paul Fix
- Michael Forest
- Ron Foster
- Dean Fredericks
- Reginald Gardiner
- Lisa Gaye
- Leo Gordon
- Tom Greenway
- Robert Griffin
- Clu Gulager
- Kevin Hagen
- Alan Hale Jr.
- Margaret Hamilton
- Stacy Harris
- Ron Hayes
- Myron Healey
- Percy Helton
- Arthur Hunnicutt
- Ben Johnson
- Russell Johnson
- L. Q. Jones
- Ray Jones
- Brian Keith
- DeForest Kelley
- Warren J. Kemmerling
- George Keymas
- Brett King
- Robert Knapp
- John Larch
- Cloris Leachman
- Nolan Leary
- Julie London
- Tom London
- Phyllis Love
- Dayton Lummis
- Herbert Lytton
- Barton MacLane
- Jock Mahoney
- Miriam Margolyes
- Ken Mayer
- Francis McDonald
- Rod McGaughy
- John McIntire
- John McKee
- David McLean
- Stephen McNally
- Jan Merlin
- Vera Miles
- Denny Miller
- Thomas Mitchell
- Read Morgan
- Ed Nelson
- Leonard Nimoy
- Lloyd Nolan
- Warren Oates
- Gregg Palmer
- James Parnell
- Dennis Patrick
- House Peters Jr.
- John Pickard
- Judson Pratt
- Ed Prentiss
- Denver Pyle
- Mike Ragan
- Gene Roth
- Herbert Rudley
- Bing Russell
- Hugh Sanders
- Jacqueline Scott
- George Selk
- Richard Shannon
- Olan Soule
- George Sowards
- Fay Spain
- Karen Steele
- Olive Sturgess
- Karl Swenson
- Gloria Talbott
- Kent Taylor
- Kelly Thordsen
- Lee Van Cleef
- Gary Vinson
- Gregory Walcott
- Dawn Wells
- Adam West
- Robert J. Wilke
- Will Wright

== Episodes ==
Season	Episodes	Originally released	
Season	Episodes	First released	Last released
1	31	September 15, 1959	April 19, 1960
2	33	September 20, 1960	June 13, 1961
3	28	September 26, 1961	April 17, 1962
4	32	September 25, 1962	May 21, 1963

== Production ==
Hoagy Carmichael's contract was not renewed after the first season, and his character was written out with the explanation that he had accompanied Andy to boarding school in St. Louis. Andy, however, returned to appear in three episodes during the first half of the second season.

To restore the chemistry of the original cast, Spring Byington, formerly of the sitcom December Bride, and Dennis Holmes joined the series at the start of the third season in 1961, in the roles of Daisy Cooper, a matronly widow, and Mike Williams, a young orphan permitted to live at the Sherman Ranch pending the location of any next of kin — which never occurred. At the beginning of its third season, Laramie was among the first television programs to make the transition from black-and-white to color. The series was canceled after its fourth season due to declining ratings.

=== The Laramie Peacock ===
The NBC peacock logo, in use since 1956, was updated on January 2, 1962, when a new version of the NBC peacock "living color" logo was introduced before the Laramie broadcast that evening. The "Laramie Peacock" featured the bird fanning its plumage against a kaleidoscopic color background, with eleven melded feathers shrinking and separating into the peacock's form; it retained the "living color" tagline of the original but used a soft, woodwind-based musical accompaniment. This version was used before every color program on the network until it was retired in 1975, though the Laramie version has made special appearances in subsequent years, mostly in a retro-kitsch context or to commemorate significant broadcast events on NBC.

== Broadcast and release ==
=== Broadcast ===
Laramie ran for four seasons, from September 15, 1959, to September 17, 1963, airing Tuesday evenings on NBC from 7:30–8:30 p.m. Eastern.

The German title of Laramie is Am Fuß der blauen Berge ("At the Foot of the Blue Mountains"), despite the Blue Mountains being located approximately 600 miles northwest of Laramie, Wyoming.

=== Home media ===
Timeless Media Group has released all four seasons on DVD in Region 1.

DVD title	Episodes	Release date
The Complete First Season	31	March 15, 2011
The Complete Second Season	30	February 7, 2012
The Complete Third Season	28	March 30, 2009
The Complete Final Season	32	September 15, 2009
