= Submarine X-1 =

- Original film poster
- Directed by: William Graham
- Screenplay by: Donald S. Sanford; Guy Elmes
- Story by: John C. Champion; Edmund H. North
- Produced by: John C. Champion
- Starring: James Caan; David Sumner; Norman Bowler; Brian Grellis
- Cinematography: Paul Beeson
- Edited by: John S. Smith
- Music by: Ron Goodwin
- Color process: DeLuxe Color
- Production company: Mirisch Films
- Distributed by: United Artists
- Release dates: 22 March 1968 (UK); August 1969 (NYC)
- Running time: 90 minutes
- Country: United Kingdom
- Language: English

Submarine X-1 is a 1968 British war film directed by William Graham and starring James Caan and David Sumner. It was written by Donald S. Sanford and Guy Elmes based on a story by John C. Champion and Edmund H. North. It is loosely based on the Operation Source attack on the German battleship Tirpitz in 1943. Lt. Commander Richard Bolton must lead a group of midget submarines in an attack on a German battleship.

== Plot ==
In 1943, a Royal Canadian Navy Volunteer Reserve officer, Commander Bolton and a few surviving crew members of his 50-man submarine Gauntlet swim ashore after unsuccessfully attacking German battleship Lindendorf. After a review, Captain Bolton is cleared of any wrongdoing and placed in charge of a small group of experimental X-class submarines. Bolton is assigned by Vice-Admiral Redmayne to quickly train crews to man the submarines and sink the Lindendorf while it is hidden away in a Norwegian fjord.

Commander Bolton is to train three 4-man crews along the northern coast of Scotland for a trio of midget submarines equipped with side cargoes of explosives. He must overcome tensions with some of his former crew members, while keeping their activities hidden from outsiders and German airplanes. The crews successfully fend off an attack by German parachute commandos, who discover their base. Bolton is forced to make hasty preparations for his attack before their submarine base can be destroyed.

Two of the submarines are lost while attempting to cut through submarine nets at the entrance to the fjord. X-2, is sunk by a German E-boat's depth charges, and a second, the X-1, is scuttled. One submarine crew is captured and taken to the German battleship for interrogation. X-3, the surviving submarine penetrates the submarine nets in the fjord and places explosives under the German battleship. The submarine then manages to escape as the battleship explodes.

== Cast ==
- James Caan as Commander Bolton R.C.N.V.R
- David Sumner as Lt. Davies R.N.V.R.
- Norman Bowler as Sub. Lt. Pennington
- Brian Grellis as C.P.O. Barquist
- Paul Young as Leading Seaman Quentin
- William Dysart as Lt. Gogan R.N.R.
- John Kelland as Sub. Lt. Willis R.N.V.R.
- Kenneth Farrington as C.P.O. Boker Knowles
- Keith Alexander as Sub. Lt. X-3
- Carl Rigg as C.P.O. Kennedy
- Steve Kirby as Leading Seaman X-2
- Nicholas Tate as Leading Seaman X-1
- George Pravda as Captain Erlich
- Rupert Davies as Vice-Admiral Redmayne (uncredited)
- Diana Beevers as Wren Butler

== Production ==
The film was one of a series of war movies made by Walter Mirisch in Britain with an imported American star in the lead.

The real X-3 was the first fully operational x-craft but was lost during a training exercise although the crew escaped using Davis escape apparatus.cX-1 and X-2 were in reality allocated to a submarine cruiser (scrapped 1936) and a captured Italian submarine, the latter later receiving the Pennant Number P711 instead. It was actually the midget submarine X-7 which successfully laid charges under the Tirpitz although the crew were captured shortly after. Another midget sub X-5 may also have laid charges but her fate is unknown.

== Reception ==
The Monthly Film Bulletin wrote: "Made by the same team as Paul Wendkos' Attack on the Iron Coast (and with an almost identical story), this war drama is never more than conventional. The rather thin plot takes an unconscionable time to get under way; and though the underwater climax is competently staged, it is not helped by generally unconvincing performances and a script which makes every character a stereotype. James Caan, talking through permanently gritted teeth, shows disappointingly in the principal role."

Kine Weekly wrote: "A sound, if not outstanding war adventure, this has enough drama and action to be acceptable in most situations. ... The plot employs a familiar tactic, that of personal abrasion between the two main characters and the way it is smoothed by the growth of mutual respect in action. This aspect of the plot carried only mild drama, for the protagonists, James Caan as Bolton, and David Sumner, as Davies are neither of them given much help by a monosyllabic script and James Caan, in particular, seems to have been determined to extend the traditional Royal Naval stiff upper lip to the whole of his face. Norman Bowler (well known to TV addicts of Softly, Softly) puts in some good work as Pennington, and Rupert Davies is a cosy, pipe-smoking Admiral: but it is the underwater photography of subs and frogmen that gives the film its fascination and excitement."

Variety wrote: "A bit quiet on the action side, compared to today's product, it moves quickly enough for family entertainment and has some first class underwater photography as an added asset. ... Acting is good but unexciting, being primarily of the stiff-upper-lip school. Caan's name is the only exploitable one in the cast and his portrayal of the Canadian commander comes over as stolid, and almost as underplayed as the British members of the cast. Art director Bill Andrews' baby subs and other handiwork are excellent, with underwater work particularly outstanding."
