= Only When I Larf =

1968 comic thriller by Len Deighton

- First edition cover
- Author: Len Deighton
- Language: English
- Genre: Comic thriller novel
- Publisher: Sphere Books
- Publication date: 1968
- Publication place: United Kingdom
- Media type: Print (Paperback)
- ISBN: 0-7221-2986-6
- OCLC: 255886426

Len Deighton's Only When I Larf is a 1968 British comic thriller describing the activities of a team of three confidence tricksters led by Silas Lowther (late 40s), his girlfriend Liz Mason (late 20s) and wannabe apprentice and Liz-worshipper Bob (early 20s). It was published in 1968 by Michael Joseph and in paperback by Sphere. It is currently (2012) printed by Harper in the UK.

The novel interleaves first-person narratives from Bob (76 pages in 7 chapters), Liz (78 pages in 6 chapters) and Silas (88 pages in 5 chapters). Their increasingly contradictory descriptions of shared experiences contribute to the humour. This unreliable narration adds to the atmosphere around deceiving "the marks". The title is explained in a variety of unlikely anecdotes where in each case a critically injured third party bravely replies this when asked "Does it hurt?"

== Adaptations ==
A film adaptation of Only When I Larf, directed by Basil Dearden, was released in 1968 starring Richard Attenborough as Silas, David Hemmings as Bob and Alexandra Stewart as Liz and has been well reviewed.
