= Macbeth (painting) =

Painting by John Martin

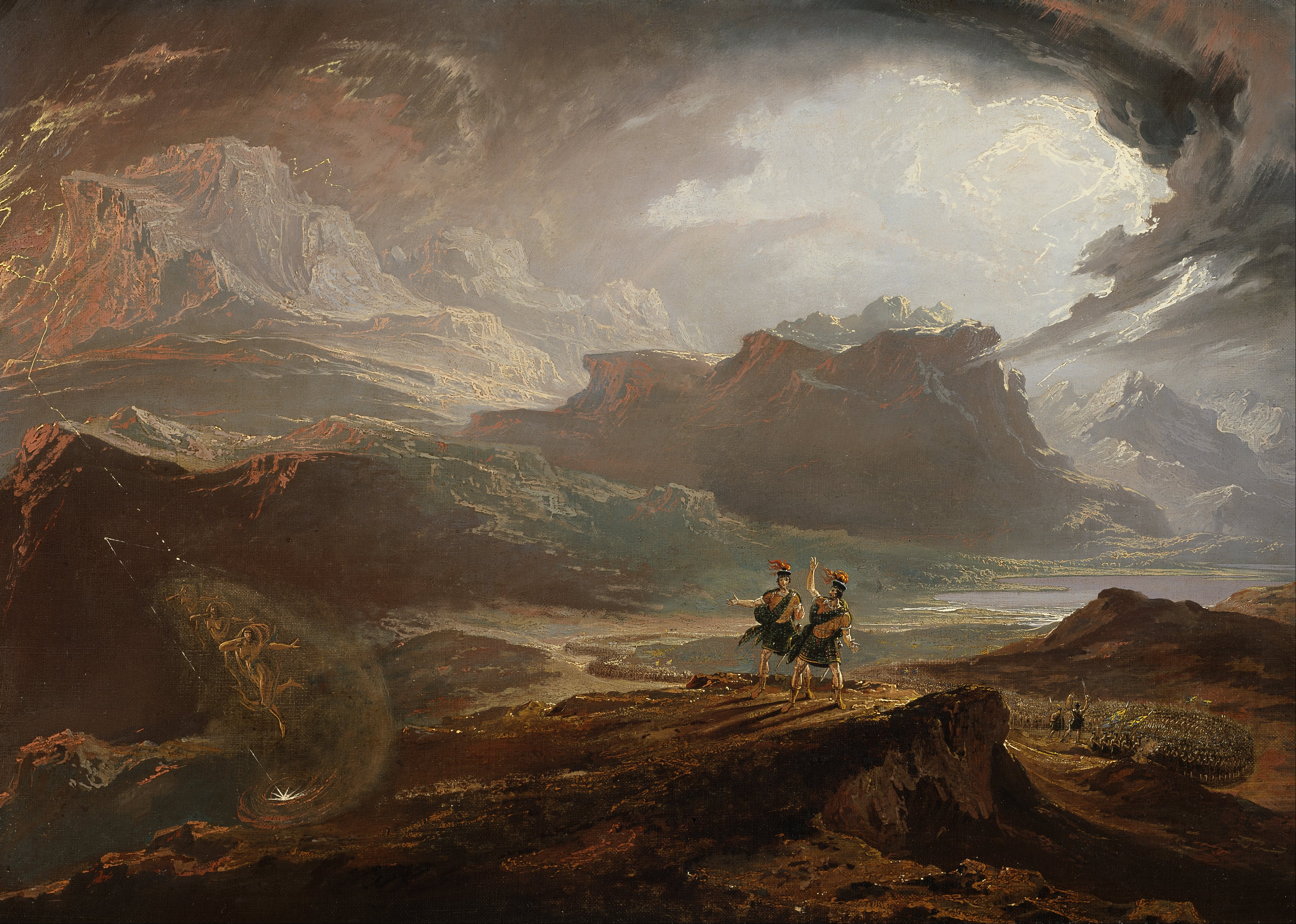
- Artist: John Martin
- Year: 1820
- Type: Oil on canvas, historical landscape painting
- Dimensions: 65.1 cm × 86 cm (25.6 in × 34 in)
- Location: Scottish National Gallery, Edinburgh

Macbeth is an oil painting on canvas by the British artist John Martin, from 1820.

== History and description ==
As was common in his work the composition combines landscape and history painting, drawing inspiration from William Shakespeare's tragedy Macbeth. It features a view of a rugged Scottish landscape in which Macbeth and Banquo encounter the Three Witches on the heath. The play was a popular subject for artists of the Romantic era and appears frequently in paintings of the era.

The original painting was displayed at the 1820 exhibition of the British Institution in London's Pall Mall. It did not sell, although Sir Walter Scott expressed regret he could not afford it for his residence at Abbotsford House. A smaller replica is now in the collection of the Scottish National Gallery, in Edinburgh, having been acquired in 1949.

== Bibliography ==
- Marshall, Gail (ed.) Shakespeare in the Nineteenth Century. Cambridge University Press, 2012.
- Myrone, Martin. John Martin: Apocalypse. Tate Publishing, 2012.
- Sillars, Stuart. Painting Shakespeare: The Artist as Critic, 1720–1820. Cambridge University Press, 2006.
