= Macbeth (1948 film) =

1948 film by Orson Welles

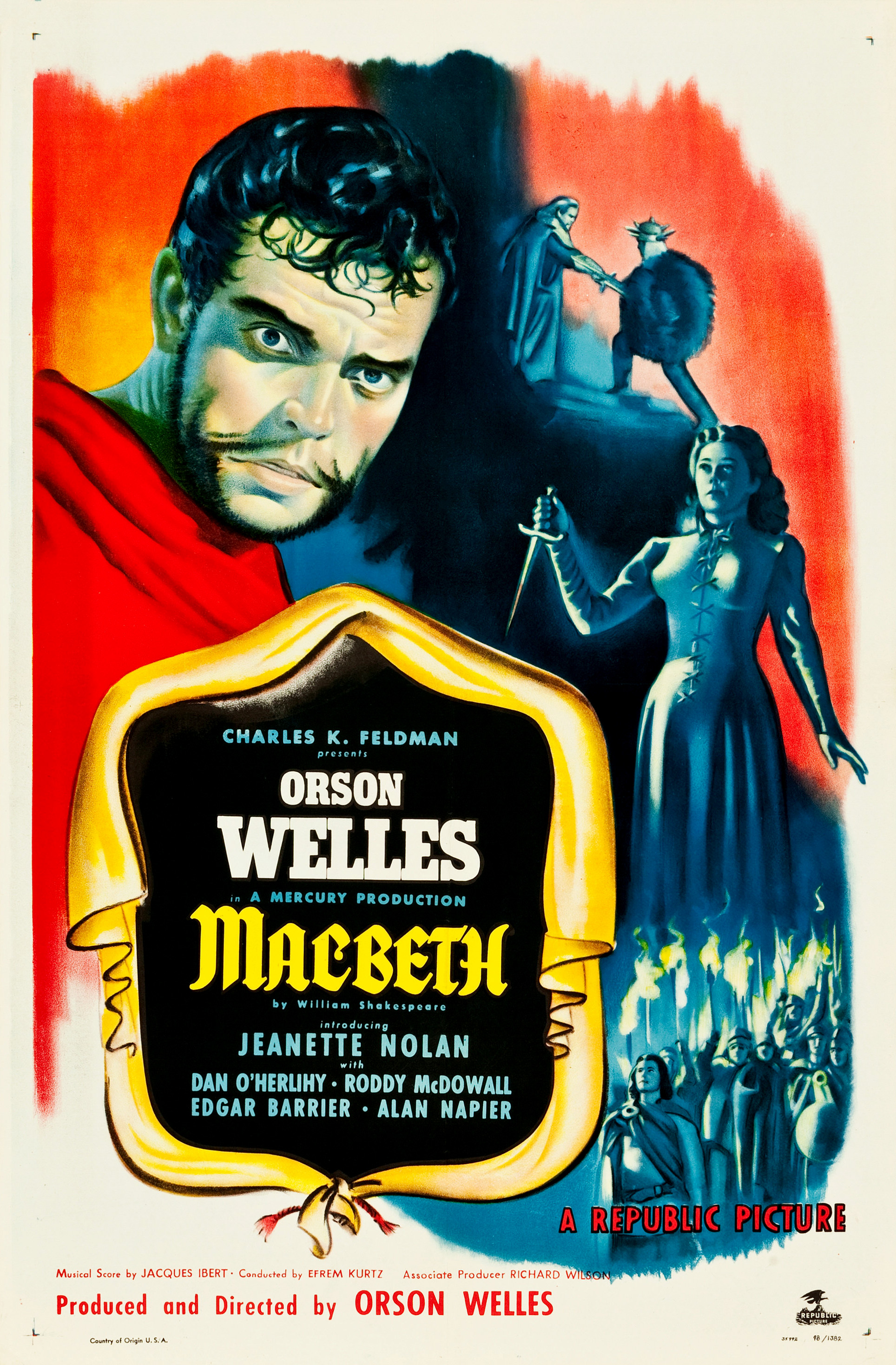
- Theatrical release poster
- Directed by: Orson Welles
- Screenplay by: Orson Welles (Note: uncredited)
- Based on: Macbeth (1606 play) by William Shakespeare
- Produced by: Orson Welles; Charles K. Feldman
- Starring: Orson Welles; Jeanette Nolan; Dan O'Herlihy; Roddy McDowall; Edgar Barrier; Alan Napier; Peggy Webber
- Cinematography: John L. Russell
- Edited by: Louis Lindsay
- Music by: Jacques Ibert
- Production company: Mercury Productions
- Distributed by: Republic Pictures
- Release date: October 7, 1948 (U.S.)
- Running time: 107 minutes
- Country: United States
- Language: English
- Budget: $800,000–$900,000

Macbeth is a 1948 American film adaptation of William Shakespeare's tragedy, written, co-produced, and directed by Orson Welles. It stars Welles in the titular role, along with Jeanette Nolan (in her feature film debut) as Lady Macbeth, Dan O'Herlihy as Macduff, and Roddy McDowall as Malcolm. The film tells the story of the Scottish general who becomes the King of Scotland through treachery and murder.

Produced and distributed by poverty row studio Republic Pictures, Macbeth utilized stylized expressionist and atmospheric production design to help compensate for its low-budget. The film's initial critical failure led Republic to re-edit the film against Welles' wishes, his original director's cut was eventually restored and released in 1980. Retrospective reviews have been far more positive, with Turner Classic Movies describing it as a "unique cinematic treasure."

== Plot summary ==
In the Middle Ages, Macbeth and Banquo are approached by the Three Witches. They address Macbeth, hailing him as the "Thane of Cawdor" and the future king of Scotland. King Duncan's men arrive and congratulate Macbeth of his victory, awarding him the title of Thane of Cawdor. Macbeth sends a letter to his wife about the Three Witches' prophecy, in which she questions whether Macbeth is capable of murdering Duncan.

Duncan welcomes and praises Macbeth, declaring he will spend the night at Macbeth's castle. Later that night, Macbeth expresses discomfort with killing Duncan. Lady Macbeth overrides her husband's objections by challenging his manhood and persuades him to kill Duncan. Offscreen, Macbeth murders Duncan but returns back to his wife with the daggers. When Duncan is found dead, Macbeth frames Duncan's two servants by placing the bloody daggers on them. Remembering the prophecy, Banquo is suspicious of Macbeth's potential role in murdering Duncan. Returning to his wife, Macbeth expresses his guilt and he proclaims he will never be able to sleep again.

Duncan's sons Malcolm and Donalbain have fled, in which Macbeth is crowned the new king of Scotland. Worried that Banquo's descendants would rule Scotland, Macbeth invites Banquo to a royal banquet. He sends two men to successfully murder Banquo, but his son Fleance escapes. At the banquet, Macbeth becomes haunted after seeing Banquo's ghost. The others panic at Macbeth raging at an empty chair, until a desperate Lady Macbeth tells them that her husband is merely afflicted with a harmless malady.

Enraged, Macbeth is warned by the Three Witches to beware of Macduff, who has fled to England. Macbeth frames Macduff as a traitor and sends soldiers to kill him. When the soldiers arrive at Macduff's castle, everyone is put to death, including Lady Macduff and their young son. Back in England, Ross informs Macduff that his family has been killed, to which Macduff swears revenge. Together, with Malcolm and Donalbain, they return to Scotland with a massive army to wage war against Macbeth.

Back in Scotland, Macbeth learns of the approaching English army and has a doctor tend to Lady Macbeth, who is suffering from hallucinations. Wracked with guilt over the murders, Lady Macbeth sleepwalks throughout the castle and falls over a steep cliff to her death. Shortly after, the English army invade, covering themselves by cutting down tree branches. They storm the castle, where Macduff battles Macbeth in a sword fight. Macduff beheads Macbeth, and Ross presents the crown to Malcolm.

== Cast ==
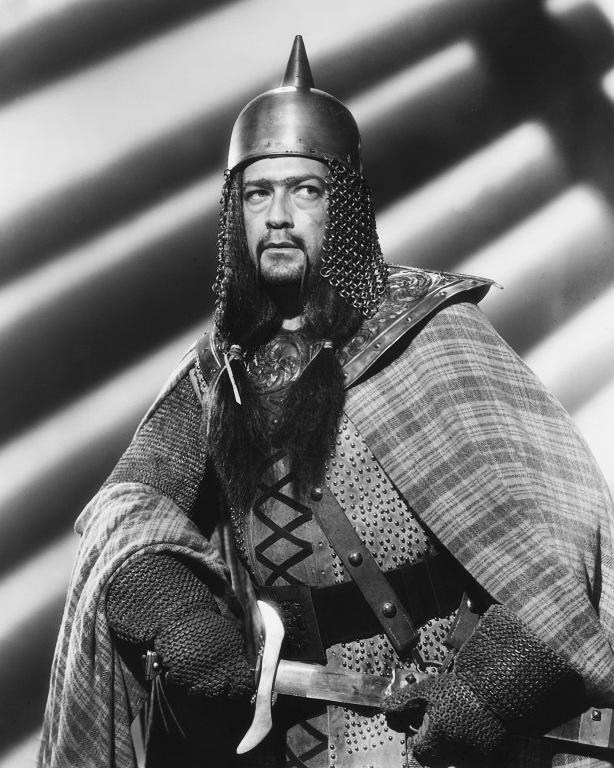
Edgar Barrier (Banquo)

The cast of Macbeth is listed in the AFI Catalog of Feature Films.

- Orson Welles as Macbeth
- Jeanette Nolan as Lady Macbeth
- Dan O'Herlihy as Macduff
- Roddy McDowall as Malcolm
- Edgar Barrier as Banquo
- Alan Napier as A Holy Father
- Erskine Sanford as Duncan
- John Dierkes as Ross
- Keene Curtis as Lennox
- Peggy Webber as Lady Macduff and Witch
- Lionel Braham as Siward
- Archie Heugly as Siward
- Jerry Farber as Fleance
- Christopher Welles as Macduff's child
- Morgan Farley as Doctor
- Lurene Tuttle as Gentlewoman and Witch
- Brainerd Duffield as First Murderer and Witch
- William Alland as Second Murderer
- George Chirello as Seyton
- Gus Schilling as A porter
- Robert Alan as Third Murderer (uncredited)
- Harry Wilson as Banquet Guest (uncredited)

== Adaptation ==
In bringing Macbeth to the screen, Welles made several changes to Shakespeare's original. He added sequences involving the witches to increase their significance. At the beginning of the film, they create a clay figurine of Macbeth, which is used to symbolize his rise and ruin. It collapses in a heap, seemingly of its own volition, immediately after Macbeth is beheaded. The witches seem to cast a spell on the doll, and anything that happens to it seems to happen also to Macbeth, as in voodoo. The witches also return at the end of the film, viewing the drama from afar and uttering "Peace, the charm's wound up" as the final line (a change Welles previously introduced in Voodoo Macbeth). In the original text, this line is spoken in the first act, when the witches initially confront Macbeth.

Because of censorship, the Porter's speech was shorn of all its double entendre.

A major change is Welles' introduction of a new character, the Holy Man. The priest recites the prayer of Saint Michael. Welles later explained that the character's presence was meant to confirm that "the main point of that production is the struggle between the old and new religions. I saw the witches as representatives of a Druidical pagan religion suppressed by Christianity – itself a new arrival." There is a subtle insinuation that Lady Macbeth fatally stabs Duncan prior to Macbeth's attack on the king, and Macbeth is witness to Lady Macbeth's sleepwalking and madness scene; in the play, he is not present.

== Production ==
=== Development ===
In 1947, Orson Welles began promoting the notion of bringing a Shakespeare drama to the motion picture screen. He initially attempted to pique Alexander Korda's interest in an adaptation of Othello, but was unable to gather support for the project. Welles switched to pushing for a film adaptation of Macbeth, which he visualized in its violent setting as "a perfect cross between Wuthering Heights and Bride of Frankenstein."

Teaming with producer Charles K. Feldman, Welles successfully convinced Herbert Yates, founder and president of Republic Pictures, of the prospect of creating a film version of Macbeth. Yates was attempting to raise the level of his studio, which produced Roy Rogers Westerns and low-budget features, into that of a prestige studio. Republic had already tried to present off-beat features, including Gustav Machatý's Jealousy (1945) and Ben Hecht's Specter of the Rose (1946).

Welles had previously staged the so-called Voodoo Macbeth in 1936 in New York City with an all-black cast, and again in 1947 in Salt Lake City as part of the Utah Centennial Festival. He borrowed aspects from both productions for his film adaptation.

Macbeth marked the fourth time that a post-silent era Hollywood studio produced a film based on a Shakespeare play: United Artists had produced The Taming of the Shrew in 1929, Warner Brothers made A Midsummer Night's Dream in 1935, and Metro-Goldwyn-Mayer produced Romeo and Juliet in 1936. None of these films were commercially successful, but the commercial and critical prestige earned by Laurence Olivier's film version of Henry V (which was produced in Great Britain in 1944 but not seen in the U.S. until 1946) helped to propel Welles' Macbeth forward.

=== Budget ===
However, Yates was not able to provide Welles with a large budget. Welles guaranteed to deliver a completed negative of Macbeth on a budget of $700,000. When some members of the Republic board of directors expressed misgivings on the project, Welles had a contract drawn in which he agreed to personally pay any amount over $700,000.

=== Casting ===
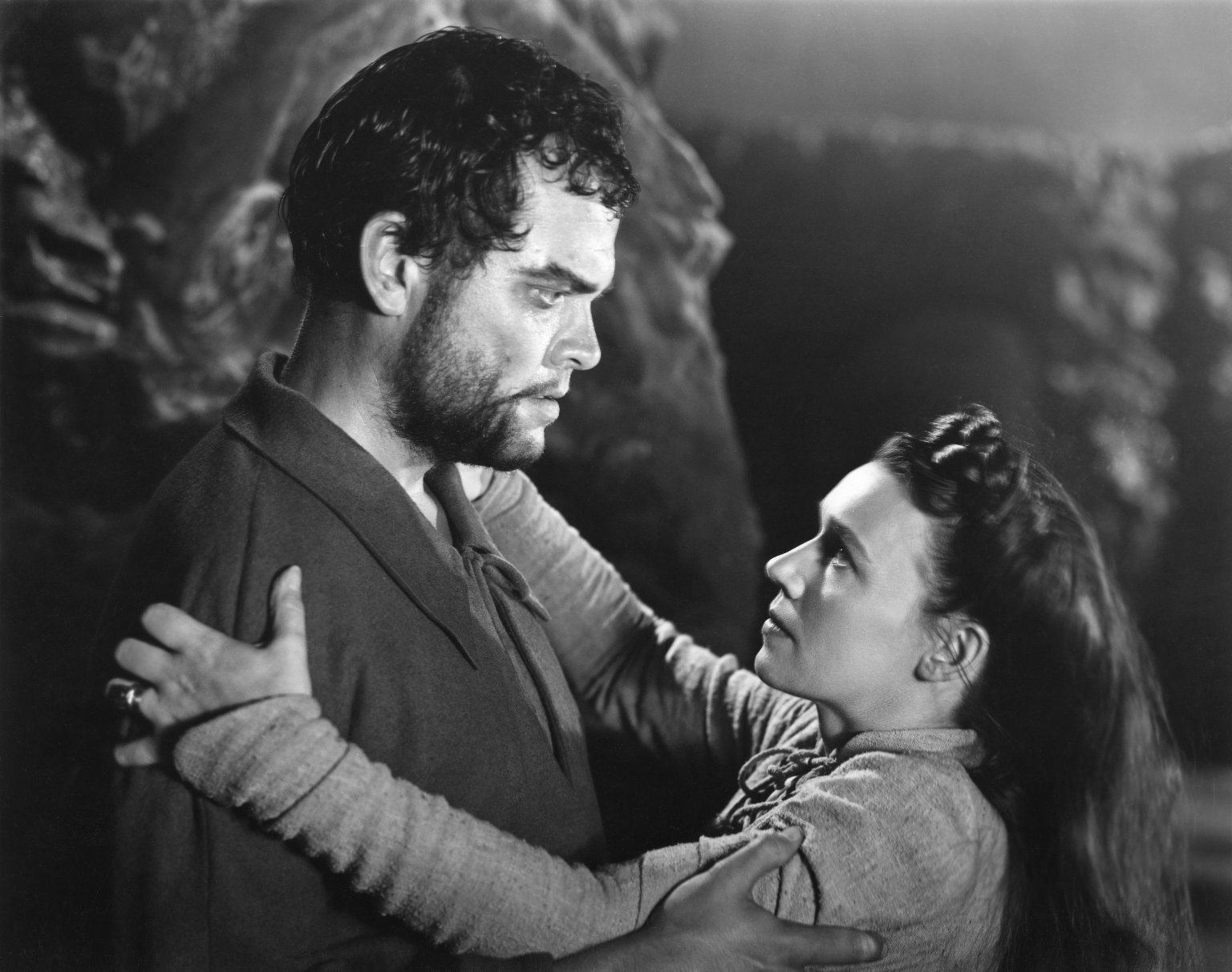
Orson Welles (Macbeth) and Jeanette Nolan (Lady Macbeth)

Welles cast himself in the title role, but was initially stymied in casting Lady Macbeth, regarded by Republic as the focus of the film. His first choice was Vivien Leigh, but Welles never approached her since he believed her husband, Laurence Olivier, would be unsupportive. The role was offered to Tallulah Bankhead, who turned it down. At Welles's request Anne Baxter, Mercedes McCambridge and Agnes Moorehead were approached but they were unavailable. "There is no evidence to suggest that these rejections were much of a blow to Welles," wrote biographer Frank Brady. Welles settled on Jeanette Nolan, one of the Mercury Theatre's repertory players on radio and a trusted colleague since their days on The March of Time radio program.

Welles brought in Irish actor Dan O'Herlihy in his first U.S. film role as Macduff, and cast former child star Roddy McDowall as Malcolm. Welles also cast his daughter Christopher in the role of Macduff's son; this was her only film appearance.

=== Filming ===
The film was shot on sets left over from the westerns that were normally made at Republic Studios. In order to accommodate the tight production schedule, Welles had the Macbeth cast pre-record their dialogue.

Welles later expressed frustration with the film's low budget trappings. Most of the costumes were rented from Western Costume, except those for Macbeth and Lady Macbeth. "Mine should have been sent back, because I looked like the Statue of Liberty in it," Welles told filmmaker Peter Bogdanovich. "But there was no dough for another and nothing in stock at Western would fit me, so I was stuck with it."

Welles also told Bogdanovich that the scene he felt was most effective was actually based on hunger. "Our best crowd scene was a shot where all the massed forces of Macduff's army are charging the castle", he said. "There was a very vivid urgency to it, because what was happening, really, was that we'd just called noon break, and all those extras were rushing off to lunch."

Welles shot Macbeth in 23 days, with one day devoted to retakes.

== Release and reception ==
Republic initially planned to have Macbeth in release by December 1947, but Welles was not ready with the film. The studio entered the film in the 1948 Venice Film Festival, but it was abruptly withdrawn when it was compared unfavorably against Olivier's version of Hamlet, which was also in the festival's competition.

In the U.S. theatrical release, Republic tested the film in a few cities. Critical reaction was overwhelmingly negative, with complaints about Welles's decision to have his cast speak in Scottish burrs and modify the original text.

After its original release, Republic had Welles cut two reels from the film and ordered him to have much of the soundtrack re-recorded with the actors speaking in their natural voices, and not the approximation of Scottish accents that Welles initially requested. This new version was released by Republic in 1950. While critical reaction was still not supportive, the film earned a small profit for the studio.

Welles would maintain mixed emotions about Macbeth. In a 1953 lecture at the Edinburgh Fringe Festival, he said: "My purpose in making Macbeth was not to make a great film – and this is unusual, because I think that every film director, even when he is making nonsense, should have as his purpose the making of a great film. I thought I was making what might be a good film, and what, if the 23-day day shoot schedule came off, might encourage other filmmakers to tackle difficult subjects at greater speed. Unfortunately, not one critic in any part of the world chose to compliment me on the speed. They thought it was a scandal that it should only take 23 days. Of course, they were right, but I could not write to every one of them and explain that no one would give me any money for a further day's shooting . . . However, I am not ashamed of the limitations of the picture."

The truncated version of Macbeth remained in release until 1980, when the original uncut version with the Scottish-tinged soundtrack was restored by the UCLA Film and Television Archive and the Folger Shakespeare Library. On Rotten Tomatoes, the film has an approval rating of 86% based on 29 reviews, with an average rating of 7.4/10. The site's critics' consensus reads: "This haunting, eccentric Macbeth may be hampered by budget constraints, but Orson Welles delivers both behind and in front of the camera."

Slant Magazine wrote, "While French writers and filmmakers as disparate as Jean Cocteau, André Bazin and Robert Bresson celebrated the film, American critics panned it and U.S. audiences disdained it." Bresson claimed, "I love too much natural settings and natural light not to love also the fake light and the cardboard settings of Macbeth."

Variety wrote, "Welles' idea of Shakespeare is such a personalized version. Production was comparatively inexpensive and looks it. Mood is as dour as the Scottish moors and crags that background the plot. Film is crammed with scenery-chewing theatrics in the best Shakespearean manner with Welles dominating practically every bit of footage."
