= Macduff's son =

Macduff's Son
- Macbeth character
- Christopher Welles (left) as Macduff's son in Orson Welles' controversial film adaptation Macbeth (1948)
- Created by: William Shakespeare

In-universe information
- Family: Macduff, father Lady Macduff, mother unnamed siblings

Macduff's son is a character in William Shakespeare's tragedy Macbeth (1606). His name and age are not established in the text; however, he is estimated to be 7–10 years of age. He is Shakespeare's typical child character—cute and clever. While Lady Macduff and her children are mentioned in Holinshed's Chronicles as the innocent victims of Macbeth's cruelty, Shakespeare is completely responsible for developing Macduff's son as a character. The boy appears in only one scene (4.2).

Macduff's son is viewed as a symbol of the youthful innocence Macbeth hates and fears, and the scene has been compared by one critic to the biblical Massacre of the Innocents. He is described as an "egg" by his murderer, further emphasising on his youth before his imminent death.

== Role in the play ==
In 4.2, Lady Macduff bewails her husband's desertion of home and family, then falsely tells her son that his father is dead. The boy does not believe her and says that if his father were really dead, she'd cry for him, and if she didn't then it would "be a good sign that I should quickly have a new father." Macbeth's henchmen arrive, and, when they declare Macduff a traitor, the boy leaps forward to defend his absent father. One of the henchmen stabs the boy who cries to his mother as he dies, "Run away, I pray you!". This highlights the loyalty, affection and love which make up this character.

== Analysis ==
The murderer cries as he stabs the boy, "What, you egg! ... Young fry of treachery!" This hints at the reason Macbeth is so eager to have him killed. Macbeth, seeing that, as the Three Witches foretold, he is destined to be king with no offspring to inherit his throne, is determined to kill the offspring of others, including Fleance and Macduff's son.

The tension that exists between Fleance, Banquo's son, and Macbeth would be made stronger by the existence of a child of Macbeth, should he be portrayed as having one—whether his own natural son, or adopted. As Lady Macbeth says "I have given suck, and know / How tender 'tis to love the babe that milks me". Seeing Macbeth in a fatherly perspective produces a combination of both tender and ambitious fatherliness in him. All that Macbeth does to others' sons in the play, then, is for his own heir. (Lady Macbeth, at least, has had a child, but no actual son of Macbeth is mentioned in the play—the "babe" may have been a girl, or died young, or—more likely—been a reference to his historical stepson Lulach, from Lady Macbeth's previous marriage, Macbeth's heir but not his own son.) Some productions show this tenderness by having Macbeth frequently pat Fleance on the head, or attempt to do so, but be denied it when Fleance withdraws to his father. This rivalry between groups of fathers and sons (Banquo and Fleance, Macduff and his son, Macbeth and his lack of a son) is seen as an important theme of the play.

One scholar views the scene as parallel to the Massacre of the Innocents, in which Herod had the children of Bethlehem killed to protect his throne. The boy's innocent image is strengthened by his mother calling him "poor monkey" and a "prattler".

Throughout the play, Macbeth is concerned with controlling the future. Since children are symbolic of the future, they represent his biggest threat. Macduff's son, in his bold denunciation of the murderers, is a strong symbol of the danger Macbeth faces. Paradoxically, the more Macbeth tries to rid himself of the human emotions (compassion, love) that lead to children, the less capable he is of meeting this threat and controlling his future.

== Performances ==
Orson Welles' daughter, Christopher, played the role of Macduff's son in her father's controversial 1948 film adaptation of the play.

In PBS's Great Performances TV movie of Macbeth, with Patrick Stewart as Macbeth, set in an unnamed 20th-century militaristic society, Macduff's son is played by Hugo Docking.
