= Macbeth (character) =

Character in Shakespeare's play

- Macbeth character
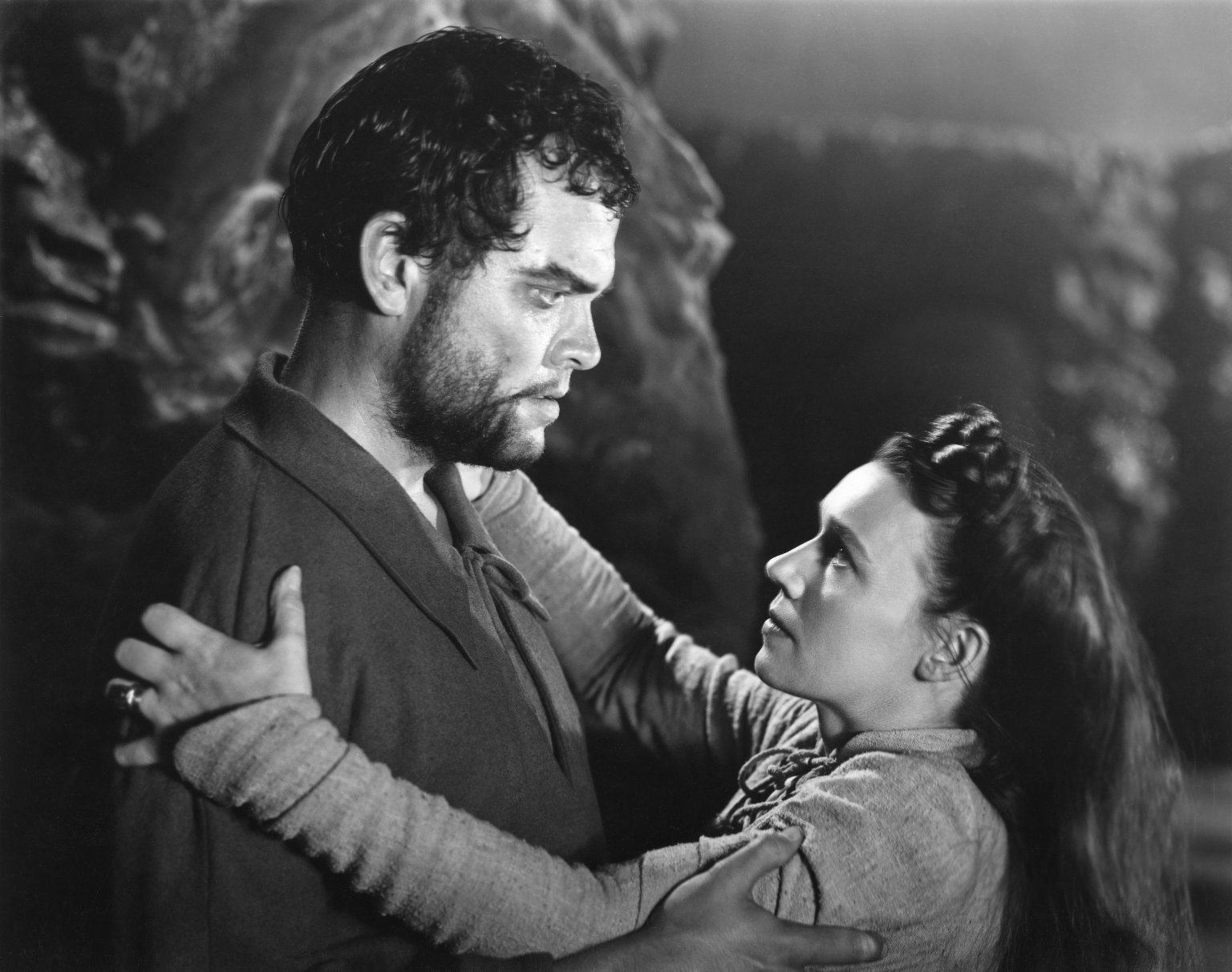
- Orson Welles (Macbeth) and Jeanette Nolan (Lady Macbeth) in Welles's 1948 film adaptation of the play, Macbeth.
- Created by: William Shakespeare
- Based on: Macbeth, King of Scotland

In-universe information
- Occupation: General (Formerly); Lord (Formerly); King (Formerly)
- Affiliation: Initially loyal to King Duncan
- Spouse: Lady Macbeth
- Relatives: Sinel (father); King Duncan (cousin); King Malcolm (first cousin once removed); Donalbain (first cousin once removed)
- Religion: Christian

Lord Macbeth, the Thane of Glamis and quickly the Thane of Cawdor, is the title character and main villain protagonist in William Shakespeare's Macbeth (c. 1603–1607). The character is loosely based on the historical king Macbeth of Scotland and is derived largely from the account in Holinshed's Chronicles (1577), a compilation of British history.

A Scottish noble and an initially valiant military man, Macbeth, after a supernatural prophecy and the urging of his wife, Lady Macbeth, commits regicide, usurping the kingship of Scotland. He thereafter lives in anxiety and fear, unable to rest or to trust his nobles. He leads a reign of terror until defeated by his former ally Macduff. The throne is then restored to the rightful heir, the murdered King Duncan's son, Malcolm.

== Origin ==
Shakespeare's version of Macbeth is based upon Macbeth of Scotland, as found in the narratives of the Kings Duff and Duncan in Holinshed's Chronicles (1587).

== In the play ==
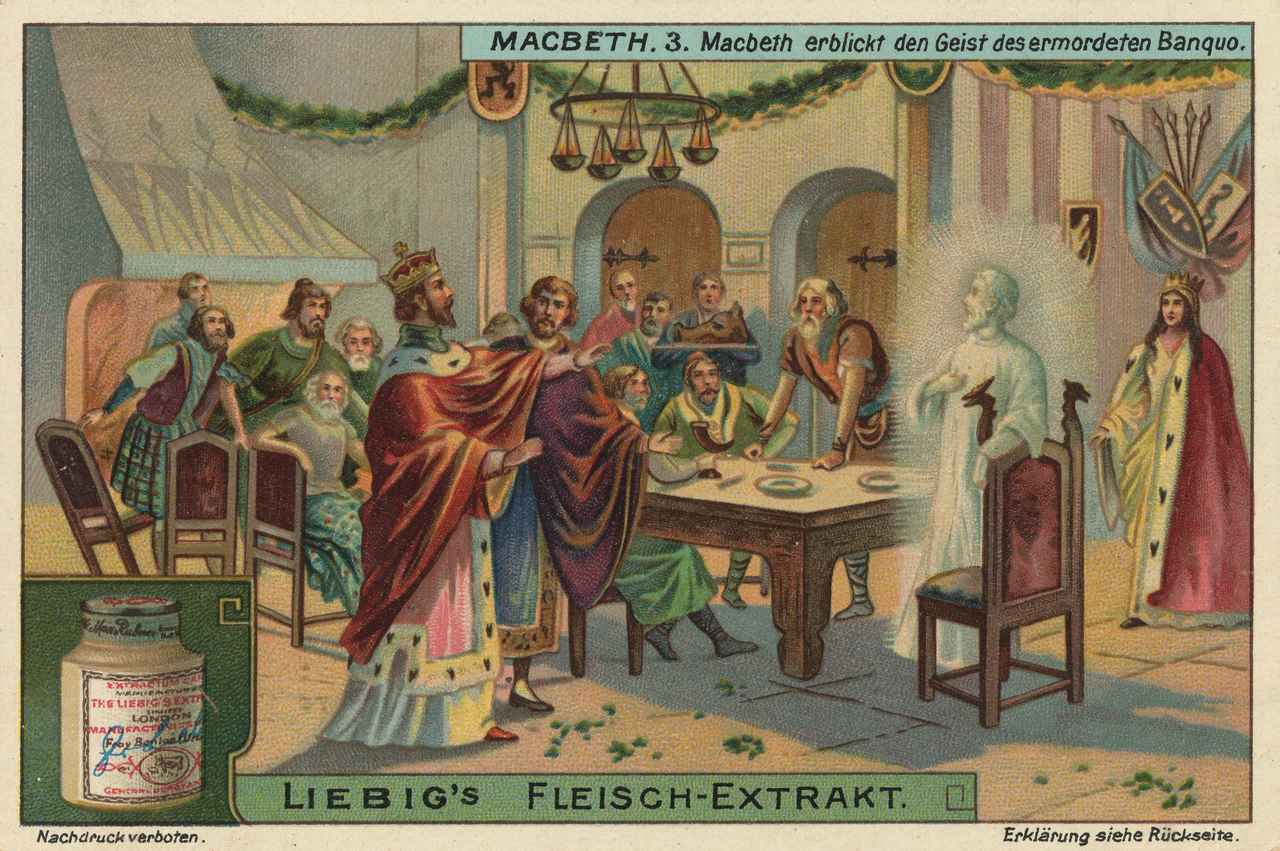
Macbeth sees the ghost of Banquo

The tragedy begins amid a bloody civil war in Scotland, where Macbeth is first introduced as a valorous and loyal general with the title of Thane of Glamis (which he inherited from his father Sinel) serving under his first cousin King Duncan, who gives a colourful and extensive exaltation of Macbeth's prowess and valor in battle. Macbeth is Scotland's hero and is undefeated in war. Macbeth's most admirable trait is bravery, "For brave Macbeth – well he deserves that name", "O valiant cousin, worthy gentleman", in Scene 4, "worthiest" and "Like valour's minion" to convey that Macbeth is bravery's favourite and extremely courageous. Macbeth is proven to be the ultimate warrior, "brandished", "carved" and "unseamed". His courageousness is also suggested, "Bellona’s bridegroom", comparing Macbeth to the Roman god of war, Mars. This gives Macbeth a legendary and epic status. When the battle is won, largely due to Macbeth and his lieutenant Banquo, the Thane of Lochaber, Duncan honours his generals with high praise and sends the messenger Ross to deliver Macbeth his reward: the title of Thane of Cawdor, since its previous holder was to be executed for betraying Scotland and siding with the enemy.

In Scene 2, Shakespeare foreshadows who Macbeth will become, "Go pronounce his present death, and with his former title greet Macbeth".

Macbeth and Banquo wander onto a heath following the conflict, where they encounter three witches who greet them with prophecies. They address Macbeth first, hailing him as Thane of Glamis and Cawdor, and that he shall be King afterwards, while Banquo is hailed as a father to a line of kings, though he himself will never rule. Macbeth's reaction was one of consumption and fixation, "rapt withal" and "look how our partner's rapt". The word 'rapt', showing how Macbeth is obsessed with the witches' powers and is tempted by their predictions. Then, as they turn to leave, Macbeth calls out "tell me more", meaning that he is interested in their abilities. In Macbeth's letter to his wife, he explains that he "burned in desire to question them further".

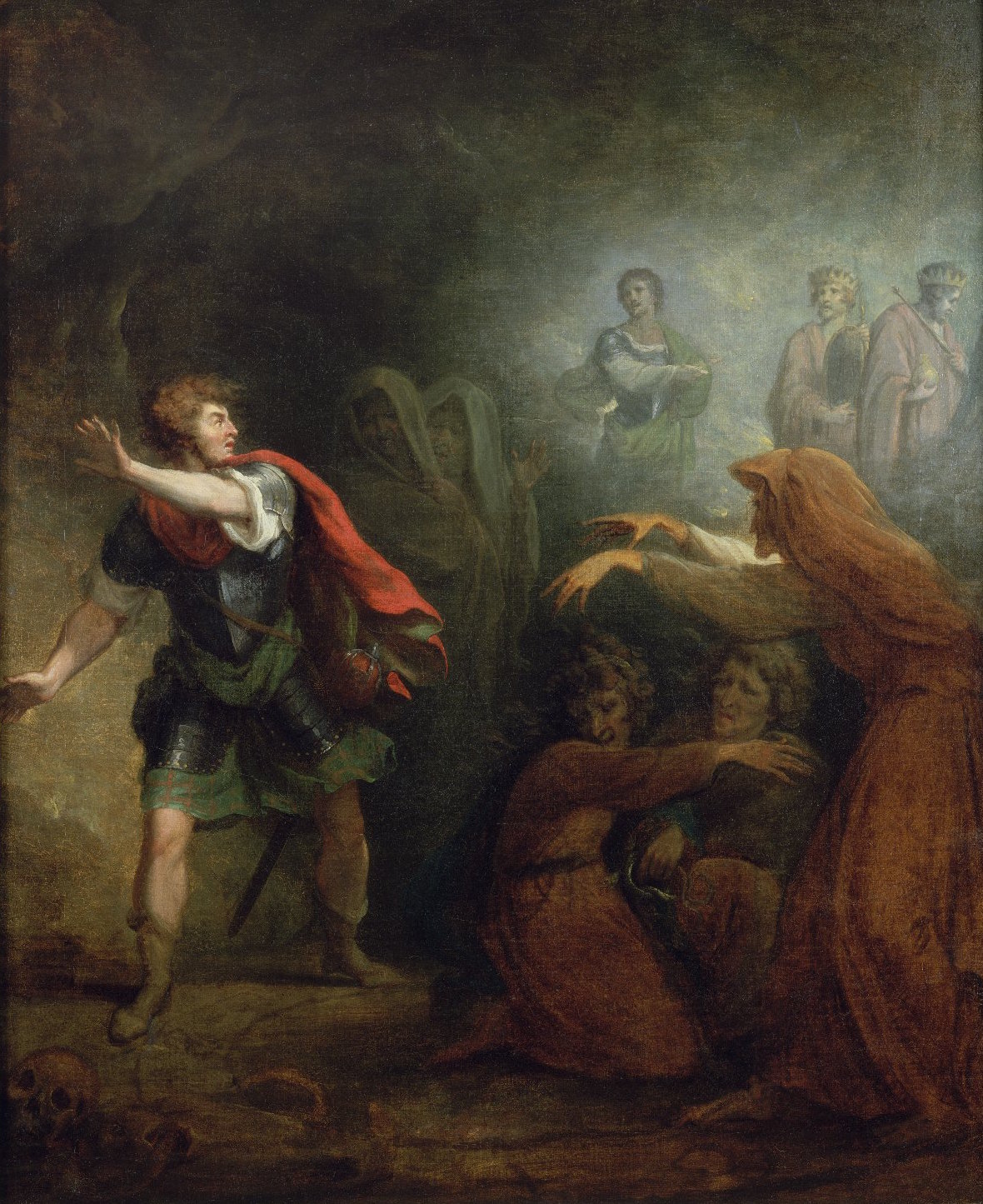
Macbeth and the witches by George Romney

Shakespeare also presents Macbeth as a very determined character who wants to control his own fate, rather than letting it be for the witches to decide. The line "Your children shall be kings" proves that Macbeth is already plotting and "horrible imaginings" demonstrates that Macbeth is already thinking of committing the greatest sacrilege of them all – regicide – despite this act will damn him to hell for eternity. This conveys how single-minded Macbeth can be.

These responses are the antithesis of Banquo's, who knew that the witches were forces of evil and should not be trusted – "can the Devil speak true?" – whereas Shakespeare presents Macbeth in this scene as if he could be corrupted and his allegiance could shift, due to his state of moral conflict – "nothing is but what is not".

As the witches disappear, Ross arrives and presents Macbeth with his new title, but it becomes apparent that Macbeth has already begun to consider murdering Duncan and taking his place as king. (In medieval times and in the Elizabethan era, plans to murder royalty were punishable by death.) He states that the kingship will fall into his lap by luck alone and that he will not have to take any action to fulfil the witches' last prophecy: "If chance may have me king, why chance may crown me without my stir". Macbeth becomes fixated on the prophecy, ignoring Banquo's advice that "oftentimes to win us to our harm these instruments of darkness tell us truths…to betray us in deepest consequence".

When he returns home, Lady Macbeth tries to convince him to kill Duncan. Macbeth at first refuses but changes his mind when she accuses him of cowardice. This suggests that Macbeth could be easily manipulated and his wife, and the witches, could see this flaw in him. When Macbeth says, "I am settled", this is the beginning of his fall from greatness, as Scotland's best defender to its nemesis.

Giving in to his ambition, he kills Duncan and plants evidence of the regicide on two guards, whom he also kills. He hears voices that say "Macbeth shall sleep no more. Macbeth does murder sleep". He acknowledges that only the innocent sleep is "the balm of hurt minds". The king's sons, Malcolm and Donalbain, fear they will be blamed for Duncan's death and flee the country. Macbeth is then crowned king.

Shakespeare cleverly compares Macbeth to Lucifer, who started out as the Morning Star, the highest and brightest one could go, but greed overtook him and he fell to become Satan, "angels are bright still, though the brightest fell". The similarities of the Devil and Macbeth are that Macbeth wanted to rise up the Great Chain of Being but, in trying, became the most hated man in Scotland.

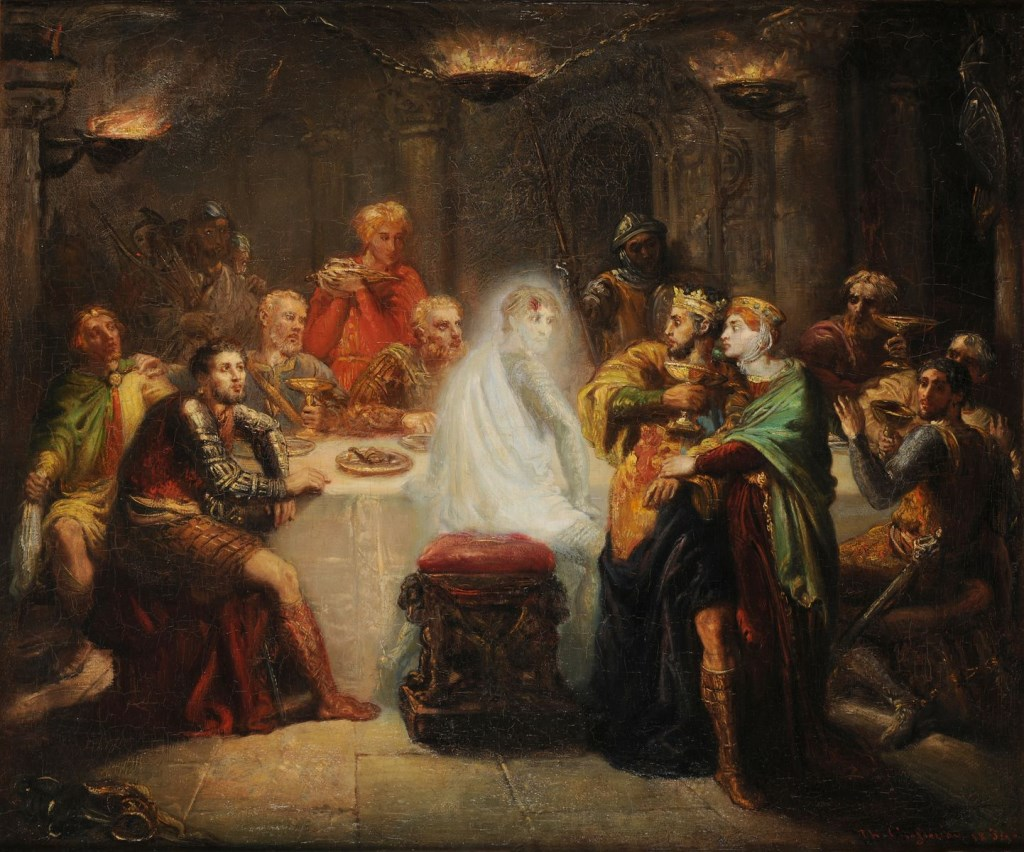
Banquo's Ghost by Théodore Chassériau, 1855

Macbeth becomes a tyrant, brutally stamping out any real or perceived threats to his power. He believes himself to be beyond redemption, "in blood stepp'd in so far, that, ... returning were as tedious as go o'er". Macbeth decides to hire two murderers to kill Banquo and his son Fleance, with a Third Murderer sent later to assist. Banquo is murdered, but Fleance survives. Macbeth goes to the witches for counsel, and their initial prophecy is for him to fear Macduff. However, they subsequently state that he will not be defeated "until Birnam wood move to high Dunsinane," and that "no man of woman born" may harm him. Macbeth takes this to mean that he is invincible. Nevertheless, Macbeth decides to get rid of Macduff and sends assassins to kill him and his entire family. Macduff escapes harm, but his wife, her young son and their entire household are brutally murdered. Macduff swears revenge and joins forces with Malcolm to overthrow Macbeth.

In Act V, Lady Macbeth is overcome with guilt; she dies and it is later postulated that she committed suicide. Now completely alone, Macbeth laments that life is a "tale told by an idiot, full of sound and fury, signifying nothing." By the end of the play Macbeth learns that the witches' second set of prophecies have hidden meanings: Malcolm's army carries shields made from Birnam wood to Macbeth's fortress in Dunsinane, and Macduff reveals that he was prematurely removed from his mother's womb, meaning that he technically was not "of woman born". Beaten but still defiant, Macbeth declares, "Lay on Macduff, and damned be he who first cries, hold, enough!" In the ensuing duel, Macduff kills Macbeth and cuts off his head, mirroring how Macbeth himself decapitated the traitor Macdonwald at the beginning of the play.

== Portrayers ==
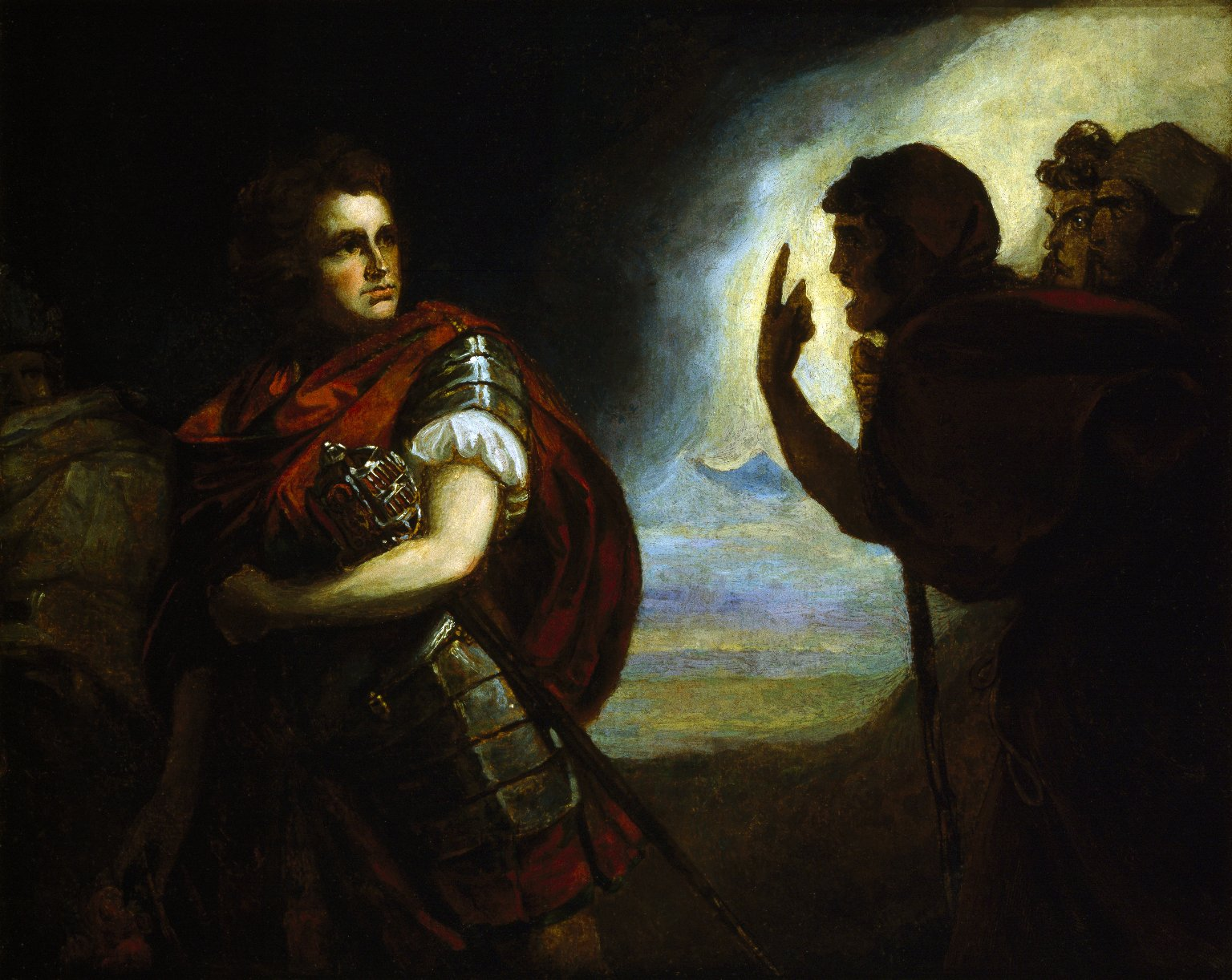
John Henderson as Macbeth, c. 1787

On stage and film, Macbeth has been portrayed by many famous actors, including Sean Connery, Kerrick Loyola, Laurence Olivier, Christopher Eccleston, Michael Rosenbaum, Alan Cumming, Sam Worthington, Orson Welles, Dakota Goodwin, Ian McKellen, Toshiro Mifune, Nicol Williamson, Jon Finch, Daniel Day-Lewis, James McAvoy, Jeremy Brett, Charlton Heston, Peter O'Toole, Patrick Stewart, Dwij Vasavada, Jason Connery, Irrfan Khan, Alec Baldwin, Ethan Hawke, Michael Fassbender, Kenneth Branagh, John Simm, Denzel Washington, Mark Rowley, and Daniel Craig. A variation of the character was voiced by John Rhys-Davies in Gargoyles.
