= Macduff (Macbeth) =

Character in Macbeth

- Created by: William Shakespeare

In-universe information
- Alias: Thane of Fife
- Affiliation: King Duncan; King Malcolm
- Spouses: Lady Macduff; deceased
- Children: Young Macduff, son; deceased Unnamed children; deceased

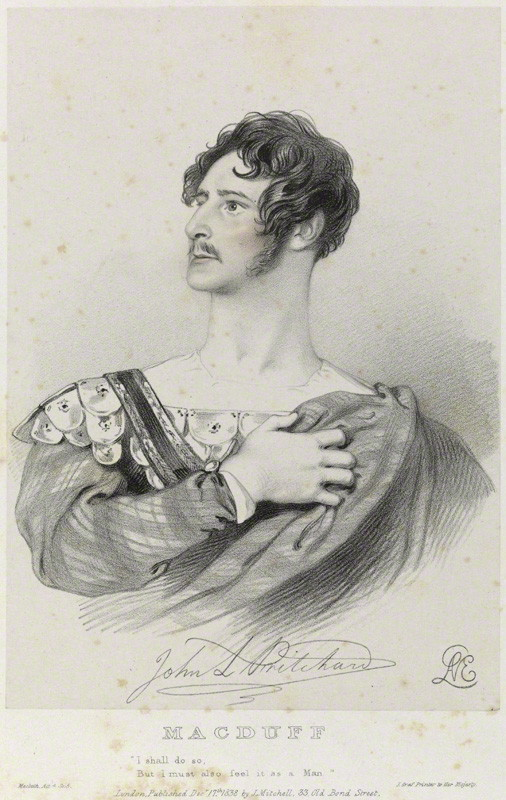
Hand-coloured lithograph of John Langford Pritchard as Macduff in 'Macbeth'

Lord Macduff, the Thane of Fife, is a fictional character and the heroic main antagonist in William Shakespeare's Macbeth (c.1603–1607) that is loosely based on history. Macduff, a legendary hero, plays a pivotal role in the play: he suspects Macbeth of regicide and eventually kills Macbeth in the final act. He can be seen as the avenging hero who helps save Scotland from Macbeth's tyranny in the play.

The character is first known from Chronica Gentis Scotorum (late 14th century) and Orygynale Cronykil of Scotland (early 15th century). Shakespeare drew mostly from Holinshed's Chronicles (1587).

Although characterised sporadically throughout the play, Macduff serves as a foil to Macbeth and a figure of morality.

== Origin ==
The overall plot that would serve as the basis for Macbeth is first seen in the writings of two chroniclers of Scottish history: John of Fordun, whose prose Chronica Gentis Scotorum was begun about 1363, and Andrew of Wyntoun's Scots verse Orygynale Cronykil of Scotland, written no earlier than 1420. Holinshed's Chronicles (1587), drew on their accounts, and Shakespeare in turn used Holinshed’s narratives of King Duff and King Duncan when writing Macbeth.

Historically, Duff was a 10th century King of Alba. In John of Fordun's work, the reign of Duff is portrayed as having suffered from pervasive witchcraft. The Orygynale Cronykil suggests that Duff was murdered. Due to the Irish use of tanistry, Duff's immediate descendants did not become rulers of Alba, and instead became mormaers of Fife. Their clan – the Clan MacDuff – remained the most powerful family in Fife in the Middle Ages. The ruins of Macduff's Castle lie in the village of East Wemyss next to the cemetery. Not only did history influence Shakespeare's work, but the work itself influenced the role of future Duffs. Few could determine where Duff Family history began and historical fiction ended, working to the benefit of the Duffs as their reach expanded into Northeast Scotland. In 1404 David Duff received a charter in Aberdeenshire from Robert III of Scotland. In 1759, his descendant William Duff was granted the historic Celtic Title of "Fife", resurrecting the title and tying the Duffs of Northeast Scotland, both to their 11th century Lowland ancestors, and to Shakespeare's MacDuff. Various Fife titles were held by the Duffs until as recently as 1929 when the dignity passed to the Carnegie descendants, where it remains in use today. This association not only secured the Duff family influence in the peerage, but also helped ensure their position as one of the largest landowners in Scotland, heading countless feudal baronies including the barony of MacDuff, named for James Duff, 2nd Earl Fife.

In Holinshed's narrative, attributes of King Duff are transposed onto the Macduff mormaer from Macbeth's era. Macduff first appears in Holinshed's narrative of King Duncan after Macbeth has killed the latter and reigned as King of Scotland for 10 years. When Macbeth calls upon his nobles to contribute to the construction of Dunsinane castle, Macduff avoids the summons, arousing Macbeth's suspicions. Macduff leaves Scotland for England to prod Duncan's son, Malcolm III of Scotland, into taking the Scottish throne by force. Meanwhile, Macbeth murders Macduff's family. Malcolm, Macduff, and the English forces march on Macbeth, and Macduff kills him. Shakespeare follows Holinshed's account of Macduff closely, with his only deviations being Macduff's discovery of Duncan's body in act 2 sc. 3, and Macduff's brief conference with Ross in act 2 sc. 4.

== Role in the play ==
Macduff first speaks in the play in act 2, scene 3 to the drunken porter to report to his duty of awaking King Duncan when he is sleeping for the night at Macbeth's castle. When he discovers the corpse of King Duncan (murdered by Macbeth, but it appears that nearby guards are guilty since Lady Macbeth put his knife by them and smeared them with Duncan's blood), he raises an alarm, informing the castle that the king has been murdered. Macduff begins to suspect Macbeth of regicide when Macbeth says, "O, yet I do repent me of my fury / That I did kill them" (2.3.124–125). Macduff's name does not appear in this scene; rather, Banquo refers to him as "Dear Duff" (2.3.105).

In 2.4 Macbeth has left for Scone, the ancient royal city where Scottish kings were crowned. Macduff, meanwhile, meets with Ross and an Old Man. He reveals that he will not be attending the coronation of Macbeth and will instead return to his home in Fife. However, Macduff flees to England to join Malcolm, the slain King Duncan's elder son, and convinces him to return to Scotland and claim the throne.

Macbeth, meanwhile, visits the Three Witches again after the spectre of Banquo appears at the royal banquet. The Witches warn Macbeth to "beware Macduff, beware the Thane of Fife" (4.1.81–82). However, they inform Macbeth that "none of woman born / Shall harm Macbeth" (4.1.91–92) — leading one to infer that no human could possibly defeat Macbeth. Macbeth, fearing for his position as King of Scotland, learns soon afterward that Macduff has fled to England to try to raise an army against him and orders the deaths of Macduff's wife, children, and other relatives. Macduff, who is still in England, learns of his family's deaths through Ross, another Scottish thane. He joins Malcolm, and they return to Scotland with their English allies to face Macbeth at Dunsinane Castle.

After Macbeth slays the young Siward, Macduff charges into the main castle and confronts Macbeth. Although Macbeth believes that he cannot be killed by any man born of a woman, he soon learns that Macduff was "from his mother's womb / Untimely ripped" (Act V Scene 8 lines 2493/2494) — meaning that Macduff was born by caesarean section. However, the medical technology for safe C-section did not exist back then, and so this likely meant that his mother died in childbirth. The two fight, and Macduff slays Macbeth offstage. Macduff ultimately presents Macbeth's head to Malcolm, hailing him as king and calling on the other thanes to declare their allegiance with him (5.11.20–25).

== Analysis ==
=== Macduff as a foil to Macbeth ===
As a supporting character, Macduff serves as a foil to Macbeth; his integrity directly contrasts with Macbeth's moral perversion. The play positions the characters of Macduff as holy versus Macbeth as evil.

The contrast between Macduff and Macbeth is accentuated by their approaches to death. Macduff, hearing of his family's death, reacts with a tortured grief. His words, "But I must also feel it as a man" (4.3.223), indicate a capacity for emotional sensitivity. While Macbeth and Lady Macbeth insist that manhood implies a denial of feeling (1.7.45–57), Macduff insists that emotional sense and depth are part of what it means to be a man. This interpretation is supported by contrasting Macbeth's famous response to the news of Lady Macbeth's death:

"She should have died hereafter
There would have been a time for such a word
Tomorrow, and tomorrow, and tomorrow" (5.5.17–19).

Macbeth's words seem to express a brutal indifference – that someday, she would have died anyway – and perhaps even suggest that he has lost the capacity to feel.

Compare Macduff's reaction upon his discovery of Duncan's corpse: He struggles to find the words to express his rage and anguish, crying, "O horror, horror, horror" (2.3.59). In some stage interpretations, Macduff's character transitions from a state of shock to one of frenzied alarm. When Ross announces his wife and children's deaths to him, Macduff's expression of grief contrasts starkly with Macbeth's resignation to Lady Macbeth's death.

=== Macduff as a moral figure ===
Although Macduff comes to represent a type of "goodness" in the dark world of Macbeth, Shakespeare also allows for some instability in his character. This becomes most evident in 4.3, when Macduff joins Malcolm in England. In this scene, the play has moved from the tumult in Scotland to England, but Macduff is questioned by Malcolm why he fled England without bringing his family, or even without warning them of the coming danger. No answer is given for this choice, and the scene continues with Macduff being told his wife and children are slain. His seemingly honest grief is at odds with this hanging question, casting his good nature into some question. Whether he believed Macbeth too honorable to slay women and children, had intended his trip to be in secret and was unfortunately discovered, or simply did not consider the safety of his family, is left unclarified.
