= Lady Macduff =

Character in Macbeth

- Macbeth character
- Peggy Webber (right) as Lady Macduff in Orson Welles' film adaptation Macbeth (1948 film)
- Created by: William Shakespeare

In-universe information
- Spouse: Macduff
- Children: Son (name unknown)

Lady Macduff is a character in William Shakespeare's Macbeth. She is married to Lord Macduff, the Thane of Fife. Her appearance in the play is brief: she and her son are introduced in Act IV Scene II, a climactic scene that ends with both of them being murdered on Macbeth's orders. Though Lady Macduff's appearance is limited to this scene, her role in the play is quite significant. Later playwrights, William Davenant especially, expanded her role in adaptation and in performance.

== Origin ==
Macduff and Lady Macduff appear in both Raphael Holinshed's Chronicles (1577) and Hector Boece's Scotorum Historiæ (1526). Holinshed's Chronicles was Shakespeare's main source for Macbeth, though he diverged from the Chronicles significantly by delaying Macduff's knowledge of his wife's murder until his arrival in England. The latter part of Act IV Scene III is "wholly of Shakespeare’s invention."

== Role ==
In Act IV Scene II, Lady Macduff appears alongside the thane of Ross and her unnamed son. She is furious at her husband for his desertion of his family. Ross attempts to comfort her, though he offers little consolation and Lady Macduff responds with sharp retorts that betray her anger toward her husband. Claiming to be overcome with emotion, Ross takes his leave. Lady Macduff is left with her son, whom she speaks with, her fury toward Macduff mingling with her affection for her child. This domesticity is interrupted by the arrival of a messenger who warns her of imminent danger and urges her to escape with her children. Lady Macduff is alarmed and moments later, the scene is invaded by a group of murderers sent by Macbeth. The son is killed first and he urges his mother to flee. She heeds his words and exits the scene screaming, "Murder!". She is killed off-stage, one of several significant offstage murders in the play.

=== Analysis of Lady Macduff ===
Lady Macduff's entire portrait as a character is painted in this one scene, though it is clear through her actions that she is a fiercely protective mother and a woman who is not afraid to speak out against others. She speaks out unabashedly against her husband's disloyalty, saying "He loves us not" and "His flight was madness." When one of the murderers asks where her husband is she bravely replies, "I hope in no place so unsanctified / Where such as thou mayst find him." These interactions with other characters reveal her outspokenness.

Lady Macduff challenges her husband's actions, questioning, "What had he done to make him fly the land?" and raising a question of loyalty that the play never fully resolves.

This challenge is immediately taken up by Macduff in the next scene, Act IV Scene iii. When Ross enters to tell him of the news of his wife and children's death, he immediately asks after his wife and children. Macduff's fear for their safety and guilt is apparent, especially when he questions, "The tyrant has not battered at their peace?". When he finally hears the news, his reaction suggests both shock and guilt. He asks multiple times if his wife and "pretty ones" are actually dead. The murder of Macduff's family and his shock at this event convince Malcolm of Macduff's trustworthiness and disloyalty to Macbeth.

=== Lady Macduff and Lady Macbeth ===
Lady Macduff and Lady Macbeth are two who, "share some basic qualities but diverge in others". Though Lady Macduff is a foil to Lady Macbeth, they are not entirely opposites. Like Lady Macbeth, Lady Macduff has a husband who has abandoned her with the intention to manipulate power. Both feel the pain of loss and neither entirely understands her spouse. The contrasts are just as clear and ironic. Lady Macbeth believes her husband to be too full of the "milk of human kindness", while Lady Macduff is furious at her husband for his unkind abandonment of his family. Lady Macduff is a domestic and caring figure: her scene is one of the few times when child and parent are seen together, parallel to an earlier scene between Banquo and his son Fleance. These nurturing parents contrast starkly with Lady Macbeth's assertion that she would dash her child's brains out rather than give up her ambitions. Lady Macbeth has control over her husband's action at the beginning while Lady Macduff did not have control as Macduff just left Lady Macduff without her consultation.

== Performance history ==
Later playwrights have found the parallels between Ladies Macduff and Macbeth fascinating and expanded Lady Macduff's role in the play to directly contrast with Lady Macbeth and her actions. Sir William Davenant inaugurated this strategy in his adaptation of 1674, as part of his larger effort to educate the English populace on the proper discipline of human emotions. Davenant greatly expanded Lady Macduff's role, having her appear in four new scenes: "the first with Lady Macbeth, the second with her husband in which they are visited by the witches, the third in which she tries to dissuade him from opposing Macbeth, and the fourth where, hearing of Banquo’s murder, she urges Macduff to flee to England." These revisions greatly increased her role as a foil to Lady Macbeth, with Lady Macbeth dedicated to evil and Lady Macduff dedicated to good.

In later performances of Macbeth, especially during the eighteenth century, the violence of the murder of children could not be tolerated and Act IV Scene ii was generally deleted even as late as 1904. Samuel Taylor Coleridge argued for the tragic effectiveness of this scene:

"This scene, dreadful as it is, is still a relief, because a variety, because domestic, and therefore soothing, as associated with the only real pleasures of life. The conversation between Lady Macduff and her child heightens the pathos, and is preparatory for the deep tragedy of their assassination."

In Witches & Jesuits, Garry Wills suggests that Shakespeare may have had the same actor play Lady Macbeth and Lady Macduff (a common practice known as "doubling"). He argues that this choice would have emphasized the connection between the two characters and increased the impact of Lady Macbeth's sleepwalking scene, as well as addressed the shortage of available boy actors.
