= Holinshed's Chronicles =

1577 compilation history of the British Isles

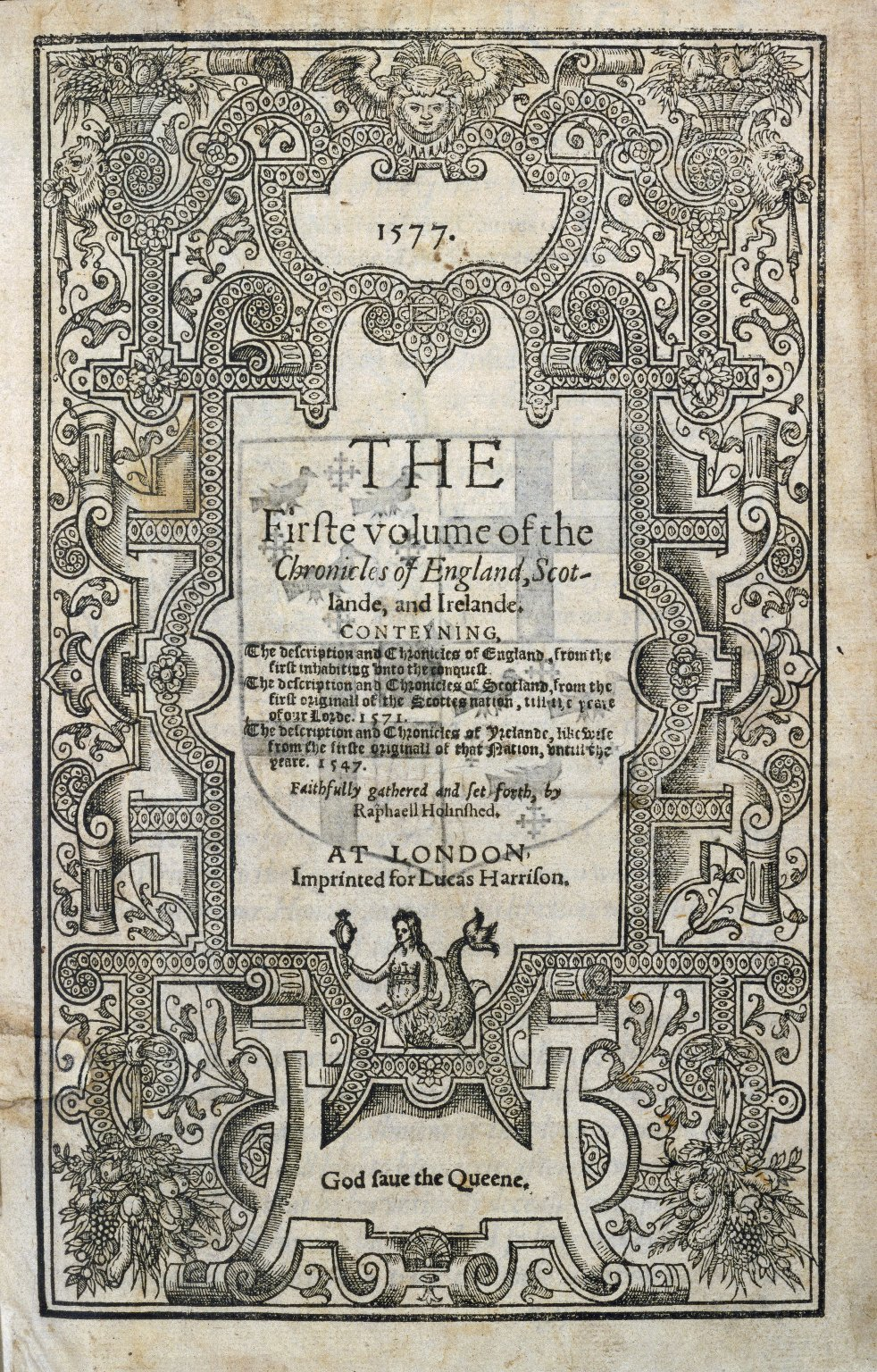
The title page of the 1577 first edition of Holinshed's Chronicles

Holinshed's Chronicles, also known as Holinshed's Chronicles of England, Scotland, and Ireland, a collaborative work, was planned as a comprehensive description of British history. The first edition, published in 1577 in two volumes, was divided into four parts (each part described on the title page as a volume): England to the Norman Conquest, Scotland to 1571, and Ireland to 1547; and England from William the Conqueror to the present time. A similarly structured second edition in 1587 brought the narrative history of each country up to 1586, and added further cross-references to sources.

The Chronicles have been a source of interest because of their extensive links to Shakespearean history, as well as King Lear, Macbeth and Cymbeline. Recent studies of the Chronicles have focused on an inter-disciplinary approach; numerous literary scholars have studied the traditional historiographical materials through a literary lens, with a focus on how contemporary men and women would have read historical texts.

The Chronicles would have been a primary source for many other literary writers of the Renaissance such as Christopher Marlowe, Edmund Spenser and George Daniel.

== Description ==
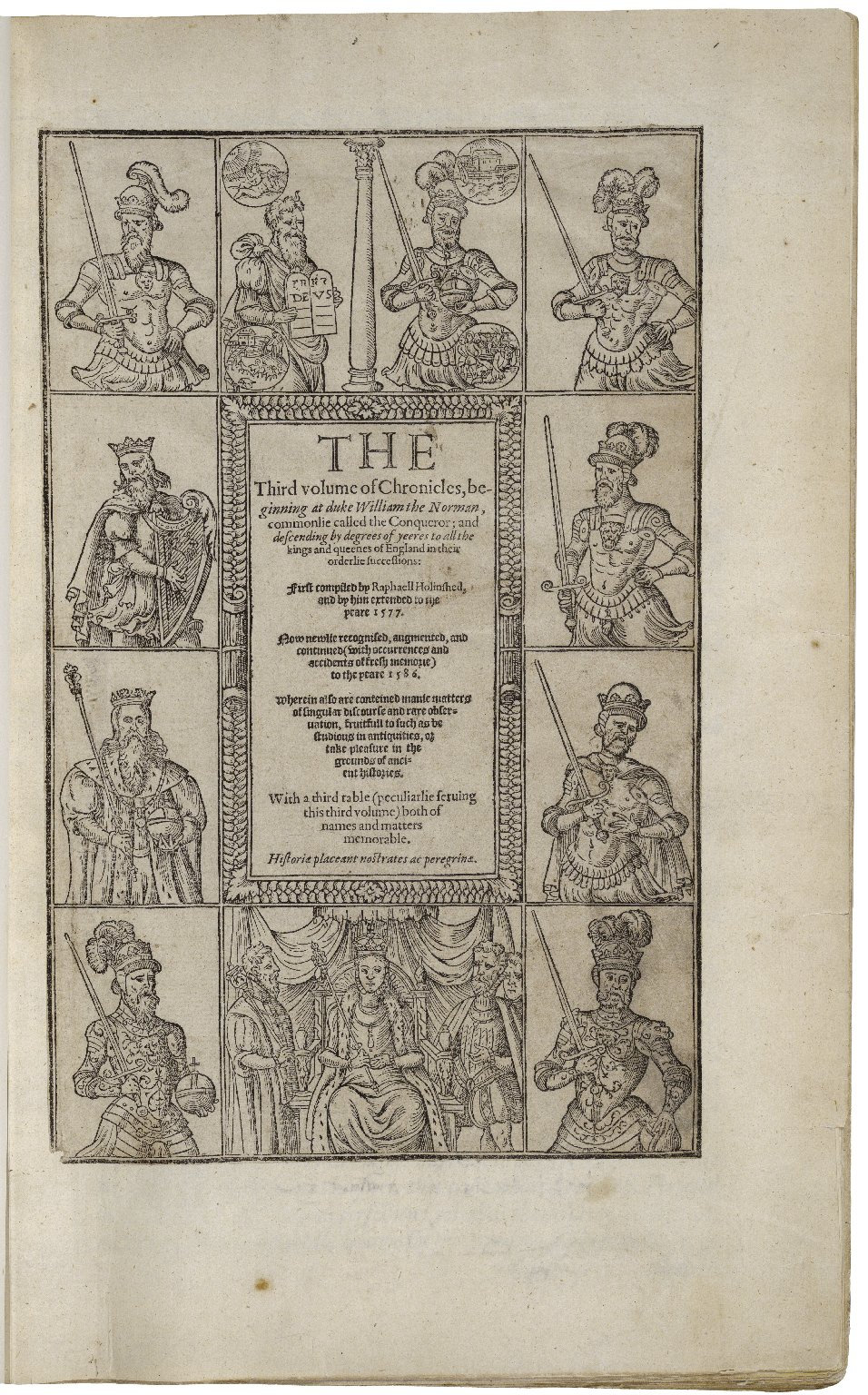
Title page of the second edition

In 1548, Reginald Wolfe, a London printer, conceived the idea of creating a "Universal Cosmography of the whole world, and therewith also certain particular histories of every known nation". He wanted the work to be printed in English, and he wanted maps and illustrations in the book as well. He acquired many of John Leland's works, and with these he constructed chronologies and drew maps that were up to date. When Wolfe realised he could not complete this project on his own, he hired Raphael Holinshed and William Harrison to assist him.

Wolfe died with the work still uncompleted in 1573, and the project—changed to a work specifically about the British Isles—was run by a consortium of three members of the Stationers' Company. They retained Holinshed, who employed Harrison, Richard Stanyhurst, Edmund Campion and John Hooker. In 1577, the work was published in two volumes after some censorship by the Privy Council of some of Stanyhurst's contribution on Ireland.

The Chronicles narrative is characterised by a set of rhetorical figures and thematic paradigms that establish the national, royal, chivalrous and heroic ideals that define a state, its monarch, its leaders, and the political role of the common people.

== Influence on Shakespeare ==
William Shakespeare is widely believed to have used the revised second edition of the Chronicles (published in 1587) as the source for most of his history plays, the plot of Macbeth, and portions of King Lear and Cymbeline.

Several other playwrights, such as Christopher Marlowe, used the Chronicles as a source.

=== The Chronicles and Macbeth ===
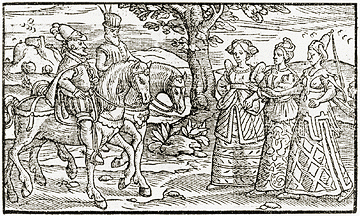
A generic picture of Lords meeting Ladies, used amongst other things for illustrating "Macbeth and Banquo encountering the witches" in the first edition of Holinshed's Chronicles

Shakespeare used Holinshed's work extensively in Macbeth, but in modified form. An instance is the Three Witches, whom Holinshed describes as "creatures of the elderwood ... nymphs or fairies". Nymphs and fairies are generally viewed as beautiful and youthful, but Shakespeare's three witches in Macbeth are ugly, dark, and bizarre. It is believed that he made the change to heighten the suspense and darkness of the play. However, the Chronicles lacked any descriptions of Macbeth's character, so Shakespeare improvised on several points. The characters Banquo and Fleance were also taken from Holinshed's works, but they are now considered to be inventions of the 16th century.

The primary difference in the Chronicles is through characterisation. The character of Macbeth is primarily depicted as a good ruler, a king who was fair and just for 17 years. The plot displays King Duncan as a minor character and a weak king. It is possible that the reading of Shakespeare's King Duncan was inspired by the tale of King Duffe contained within the Chronicle. This story follows a similar narrative, as King Duffe and his murderer Donwald closely mirror the narrative of King Duncan and Macbeth. The bad omens following the murder of Duffe are similarly mirrored in Shakespeare's narrative.

==== Synopsis ====
The Chronicles tale of Macbeth differs from Shakespeare's version in numerous ways. The play features a scene in which Banquo and Macbeth encounter three women, each of whom speaks of a prophecy that would contribute to the characterisation of these women as 'otherworldly'. The first woman says "All hayle Makbeth Thane of Glammis" (the title which he had just inherited following the death of his father). Two of the women say "All hayle Macbeth, Thane of Cawder". The third also says "All hayle Makbeth that hereafter shall be king of Scotland". As soon as they had appeared, the three women "vanished immediately out of theyr sight".

In the Chronicles version, Macbeth is a much more sympathetic character. King Duncan is depicted as a weak ruler who violates the Scottish laws of succession by failing to consult with the Thanes before naming his son, a mere child named Malcolm, to rule after him. Macbeth and many other Thanes are enraged by this action.

Spurred on by the words of the three women he encounters, Macbeth is encouraged to attempt to usurp the kingdom by force. He is also spurred on by his wife, who is ambitious and desires the title of queen for herself.

In Holinshed's Chronicles, Banquo is shown as a scheming character: he is an accomplice in Macbeth's murder of Duncan. In comparison to Shakespeare's version, in which Duncan is murdered in his sleep, Duncan is slain in battle and his death is not highly detailed; "[Macbeth] slue the king at Enuerns ... in the sixt yeare of his reigne."

In the Chronicles, Macbeth rules Scotland not briefly, but for 10 years, and is a capable and wise monarch who implements commendable laws. In Shakespeare’s version, Macbeth fears that Banquo will seize the kingdom, so he invites him to a supper where he intends to kill him and his son. He succeeds in killing Banquo, but his son, Fleance, flees to Wales. Macbeth, convinced by the witches, whose prophesies proved correct, of his invincibility, commits outrageous acts against his subjects, gradually becoming a cruel and paranoid ruler.

The play ends with Macbeth slain by Macduff, who then brings his head to the son of the original king, Malcolm. This differs from the Chronicles, which cites some conflicts and attempts to overthrow or usurp the King, but ultimately states Macbeth as ruling king for ten years. Shakespeare’s play was inspired by the kingdom and people in the Chronicles, but imagines a different scenario and outcome.

=== The Chronicles and King Lear ===
Shakespeare's King Lear loosely follows the story detailed in the Chronicles. In the Chronicles, Leir's eldest daughters, Gonerilla and Regan, are married to the Dukes of Cornwall and Albany. After the love test Leir decrees only half of his kingdom is to be assigned to the dukes immediately, with the rest to be divided at his death. This leads to the dukes seizing power and Leir being left with only a small retinue to maintain him. Leir then flees to Gallia where his youngest daughter, Cordelia, is living. Owing to his youngest daughter's faithful support, he names Cordelia his sole heir. She and her husband Aganippus, the King of the Franks, raise an army and restore Leir to the throne, killing the Dukes. Leir then rules for two years before his death and is succeeded by Cordelia, who rules for a subsequent five years.

A primary difference in the Chronicles is the continuation of the feuding through the children of the sisters. The sons of Gonerilla and Regan rise up against and imprison Cordelia, leading to a period of civil war, and Cordelia commits suicide.

The 1577 Chronicle features woodcuts of King Lear and Cordelia, depicted as the rightful rulers and highlighting their prevailing goodness within the story.

Writers who may have influenced King Lear include Geoffrey of Monmouth and Edmund Spenser, with the anonymous King Leir also contributing inspiration.

== Bibliography ==
- Beer, Jürgen (1993), The Image of a King: Henry VIII in the Tudor Chronicles of Edward Hall and Raphael Holinshed. Peter Lang.
- Booth, Stephen (1968), The Book called Holinshed's Chronicles: An Account of its Inception, Purpose, Contributors, Publication, Revision and Influence on William Shakespeare. Book Club of California.
- Boswell-Stone, W. G. (1896), Shakespeare's Holinshed: The Chronicle and the Plays Compared. Lawrence and Bullen.
- Clegg, Cyndia Susan (1992), Which Holinshed? Holinshed's Chronicles at the Huntington Library. Huntington Library Quarterly.
- Djordjevic, Igor (2010). Holinshed's Nation: Ideals, Memory, and Practical Policy in the Chronicles. Routledge. ISBN 9781409400356
- Hermann, Ax (2014). The relation of Shakespeare's Henry IV to Holinshed. South Carolina: Nabu Press. ISBN 9781295710867
- Hosley, Richard (1968), Shakespeare's Holinshed. Putnam.
- Kewes, Paulina; Archer, Ian W.; Heal, Felicity, eds. (2013). The Oxford Handbook of Holinshed's Chronicles. Oxford: Oxford University Press. ISBN 978-0-19-956575-7.
- Patterson, Annabel (1994). Reading Holinshed's Chronicles. Chicago: University of Chicago Press. ISBN 978-0226649115.

=== Modern edition ===
- Holinshed, Raphael. Holinshed's Chronicles England, Scotland, and Ireland. Ed. Vernon F. Snow. New York: AMS, 1965.
