= Three Witches =

Characters in Macbeth

Three Witches / Weird Sisters
- Macbeth characters
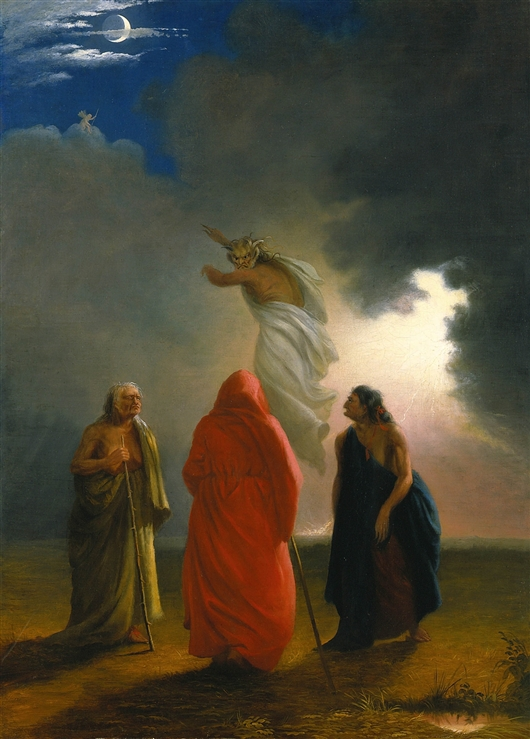
- Scene from Macbeth, depicting the witches' conjuring of an apparition in Act IV, Scene I. Painting by William Rimmer
- Created by: William Shakespeare

The Three Witches, also known as the Weird Sisters, Weyward Sisters or Wayward Sisters, are characters in William Shakespeare's play Macbeth (c. 1603–1607). The witches eventually lead Macbeth to his demise, and they hold a striking resemblance to the three Fates of classical mythology. Their origin lies in Holinshed's Chronicles (1587), a history of England, Scotland and Ireland. Other possible sources, apart from Shakespeare, include British folklore, contemporary treatises on witchcraft as King James VI of Scotland's Daemonologie, the Witch of Endor from the Bible, the Norns of Norse mythology, and ancient classical myths of the Fates: the Greek Moirai and the Roman Parcae.

Shakespeare's witches are prophets who hail Macbeth early in the play, and predict his ascent to kingship. Upon killing the king and gaining the throne of Scotland, Macbeth hears them ambiguously predict his eventual downfall. The witches, and their "filthy" trappings and supernatural activities, set an ominous tone for the play.

Artists in the 18th century, including Henry Fuseli and William Rimmer, depicted them variously, as have many directors since. Some have exaggerated or sensationalised the hags, or have adapted them to different cultures, as in Orson Welles's rendition of the weird sisters as voodoo priestesses.

== Origins ==
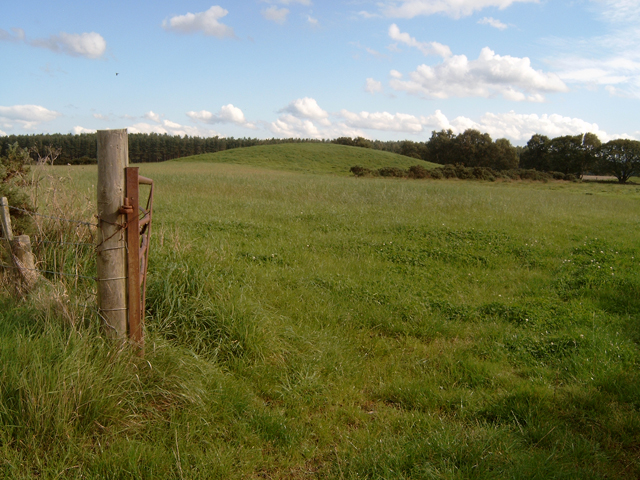
Macbeth's Hillock, near Brodie Castle, is traditionally identified as the "blasted heath" where Macbeth and Banquo first met the "weird sisters".

The name "weird sisters" is found in most modern editions of Macbeth. However, the First Folio's text reads:

The weyward Sisters, hand in hand,
Posters of the Sea and Land...

In later scenes in the First Folio, the witches are described as "weyward", but never "weird". The modern appellation "weird sisters" derives from Holinshed's original Chronicles. The word weird (descended from Old English wyrd 'fate') was a borrowing from Middle Scots and had different meanings besides the modern common meaning 'eerie'. (This and related modern senses derives from the word's usage in Macbeth.)

One of Shakespeare's principal sources is the Holinshed (1587) account of King Duncan. Holinshed described the future King Macbeth of Scotland and his companion Banquo encountering "three women in strange and wild apparell, resembling creatures of elder world" who hail the men with glowing prophecies and then vanish "immediately out of their sight". Holinshed reported that "the common opinion was that these women were either the Weird Sisters, that is [...] the goddesses of destiny, or else some nymphs or fairies endued with knowledge of prophecy by their necromantical science."

Another principal source was the Daemonologie of King James published in 1597 which included a news pamphlet titled Newes from Scotland that detailed the infamous North Berwick witch trials of 1590. Not only had this trial taken place in Scotland, witches involved confessed to attempt the use of witchcraft to raise a tempest and sabotage the very boat King James and Queen Anne were on board during their return trip from Denmark. The three witches discuss the raising of winds at sea in the opening lines of Act 1, Scene 3.

The news pamphlet states:

Moreover she confessed that at the time when his Majesty was in Denmark, she being accompanied with the parties before specially named, took a Cat and christened it, and afterward bound to each part of that Cat, the cheefest parts of a dead man, and several joints of his body, and that in the night following the said Cat was conveyed into the midst of the sea by all these witches sailing in their riddles or Cues as aforesaid, and so left the said Cat right before the town of Leith in Scotland: This done, there did arise such a tempest in the Sea, as a greater has not been seen, which tempest was the cause of the perishing of a Boat or vessel coming over from the town of Brunt Island to the town of Leith, of which was many Jewels and rich gifts, which should have been presented to the current Queen of Scotland, at her Majesty's coming to Leith. Again it is confessed, that the said christened Cat was the cause that the King Majesty's Ship at his coming forth of Denmark, had a contrary wind to the rest of his Ships, then being in his company, which thing was most strange and true, as the King's Majesty acknowledges

— Daemonologie, Newes from Scotland

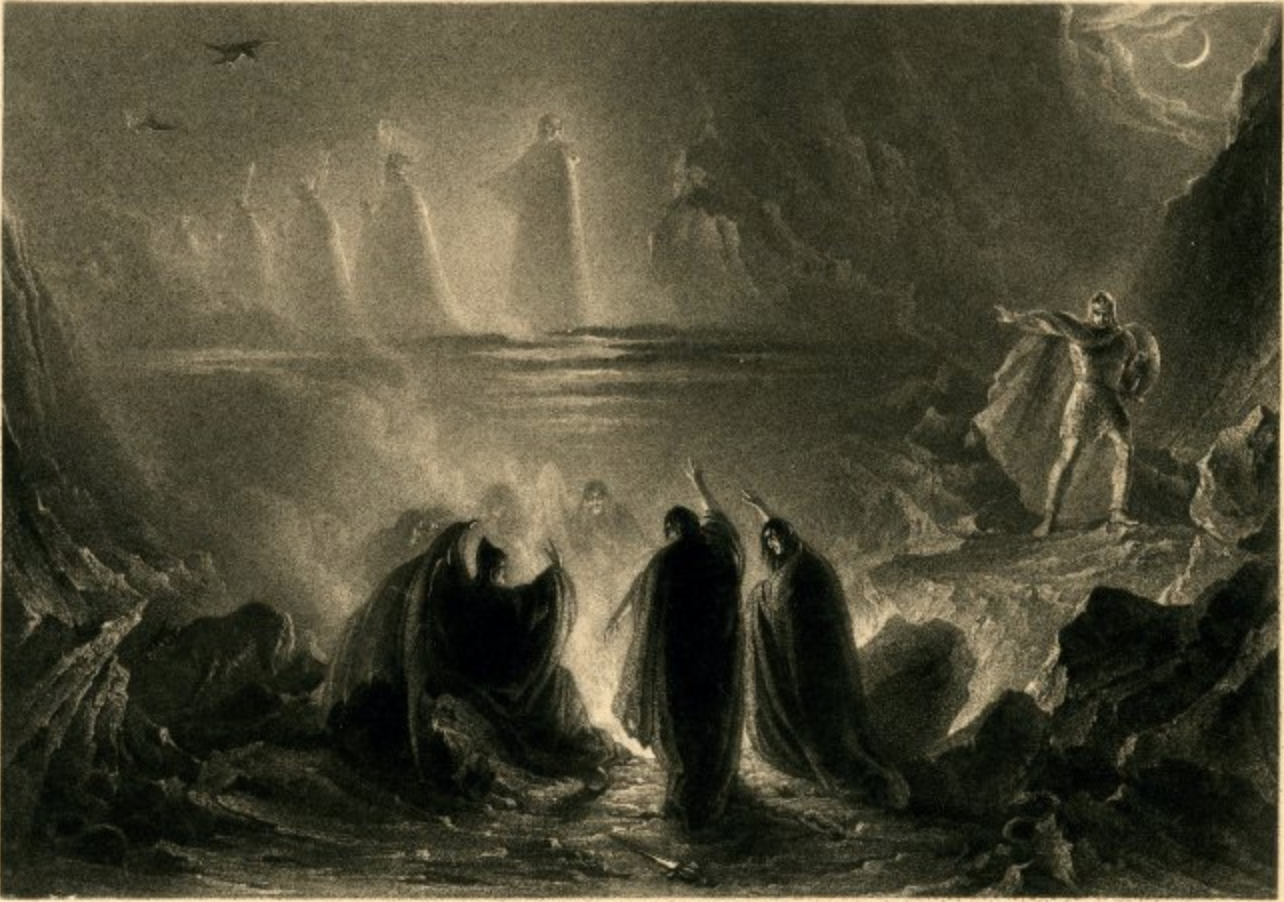
Three Witches, MacBeth, by James Henry Nixon, British Museum (1831)

The concept of the Three Witches themselves may have been influenced by an Old Norse skaldic poem, in which twelve valkyries weave and choose who is to be slain at the Battle of Clontarf (fought outside Dublin in 1014).

Shakespeare's creation of the Three Witches may have also been influenced by an anti-witchcraft law passed by King James nine years previously, a law that was to stay untouched for over 130 years. His characters' "chappy fingers", "skinny lips", and "beards", for example, are not found in Holinshed.

Macbeth's Hillock near Brodie, between Forres and Nairn in Scotland, has long been identified as the mythical meeting place of Macbeth and the witches. Traditionally, Forres is believed to have been the home of both Duncan and Macbeth.

However, Coleridge proposed that the three weird sisters should be seen as ambiguous figures, never actually calling themselves 'witches', nor are they called 'witches' by other characters in the play. Moreover, they were depicted as more fair than foul both in Holinshed's account and in the description of a contemporary play-goer Simon Forman.

== Dramatic role ==
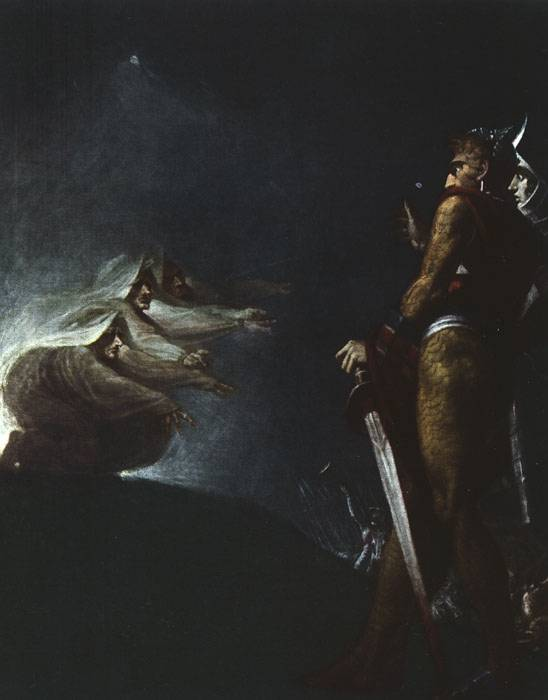
Macbeth and Banquo with the Witches by Henry Fuseli

The Three Witches first appear in Act 1, Scene 1, where they agree to meet later with Macbeth. In Act 1, Scene 3, they greet Macbeth with a prophecy that he shall be king, and his companion, Banquo, with a prophecy that he shall generate a line of kings. The prophecies have great impact upon Macbeth. As the audience later learns, he has considered usurping the throne of Scotland.

Several non-Shakespearean moments are thought to have been intruded into Macbeth sometime c. 1618; these include all of Act 3, Scene 5 and Act 4, Scene 1, ℓℓ 39–43 and ℓℓ 125–132, as well as two songs.

In Act 3, Scene 5 (believed to not be written by Shakespeare), the Witches next appear and are reprimanded by Hecate for dealing with Macbeth without her participation. Hecate orders the trio to congregate at a forbidding place where Macbeth will seek their art.

In Act 4, Scene 1, the Witches gather and produce a series of ominous visions for Macbeth that herald his downfall. The meeting ends with a "show" of Banquo and his royal descendants. The Witches then vanish.

== Analysis ==
The Three Witches represent evil, darkness, chaos, and conflict, while their role is as agents and witnesses. They appear to have a warped sense of morality, deeming seemingly terrible acts to be moral, kind or right, such as helping one another to ruin the journey of a sailor. Their presence communicates treason and impending doom. During Shakespeare's day, witches were seen as worse than rebels, "the most notorious traitor and rebel that can be". They were not only political traitors, but spiritual traitors as well. Much of the confusion that springs from them comes from their ability to straddle the play's borders between reality and the supernatural. They are so deeply entrenched in both worlds that it is unclear whether they control fate, or whether they are merely its agents. They defy logic, not being subject to the rules of the real world.

The witches' lines in the first act, "Fair is foul, and foul is fair; / Hover through the fog and filthy air", are often said to set the tone for the remainder of the play by establishing a sense of moral confusion. Indeed, the play is filled with situations in which evil is depicted as good, while good is rendered evil. The line "Double, double toil and trouble," communicates the witches' intent clearly: they seek only to increase trouble for the mortals around them.

Though the witches do not directly tell Macbeth to kill King Duncan, they use a subtle form of temptation when they inform Macbeth that he is destined to be king. By placing this thought in his mind, they effectively guide him on the path to his own destruction. This follows the pattern of temptation attributed to the Devil in the contemporary imagination: the Devil was believed to be a thought in a person's mind, which he or she might either indulge or reject. Macbeth indulges the temptation, while Banquo rejects it.

== Performance ==
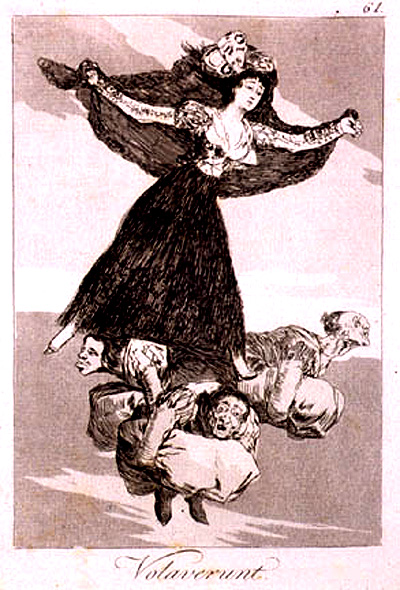
Francisco Goya's Volaverunt

=== Insertions by Davenant ===
In a version of Macbeth by William Davenant (1606–1668), a scene was added in which the witches tell Macduff and his wife of their future as well as several lines for the two before Macbeth's entrance in act 4. Most of these lines were taken directly from Thomas Middleton's play The Witch. David Garrick kept these added scenes in his eighteenth-century version.

=== Walpole's political satire ===
Horace Walpole created a parody of Macbeth in 1742 entitled The Dear Witches in response to political problems of his time. The witches in his play are played by three everyday women who manipulate political events in England through marriage and patronage, and manipulate elections to have Macbeth made Treasurer and Earl of Bath. In the final scene, the witches gather around a cauldron and chant "Double, double, Toil and Trouble / parties burn and Nonsense bubble." Into their concoction they throw such things as "Judgment of a Beardless Youth" and "Liver of a Renegade". The entire play is a commentary on the political corruption and irrationality surrounding the period.

=== Welles' "voodoo Macbeth" ===
Orson Welles' stage production of Macbeth sets the play in Haiti, and casts the witches as voodoo priestesses. As with earlier versions, the women are bystanders to the murder of Banquo, as well as Lady Macbeth's sleepwalking scene. Their role in each of these scenes suggests they were behind Macbeth's fall in a more direct way than Shakespeare's original portrays. The witches encroach further and further into his domain as the play progresses, appearing in the forest in the first scene and in the castle itself by the end. Directors often have difficulty keeping the witches from being exaggerated and overly-sensational.

=== Marowitz's and Ionesco's witches' secret identities ===
Charles Marowitz created A Macbeth in 1969, a streamlined version of the play which requires only eleven actors. The production strongly suggests that Lady Macbeth is in league with the witches. One scene shows her leading the three to a firelight incantation.

In Eugène Ionesco's satirical version of the play Macbett (1972), one of the witches removes a costume to reveal that she is, in fact, Lady Duncan, and wants to be Macbeth's mistress. Once Macbeth is King and they are married, however, she abandons him, revealing that she was not Lady Duncan all along, but a witch. The real Lady Duncan appears and denounces Macbeth as a traitor.

=== Felipe's adaption to Spanish ===
The Spanish poet and playwright León Felipe wrote a version of Shakespeare's play in Spanish which significantly changes the witches' role, especially in the final scene. After Macbeth's death, the Three Witches reappear in the midst of wind and storm, which they have been associated with throughout the play, to claim his corpse. They carry it to a ravine and shout, "Macbeth! Macbeth! Macbeth! / We have an appointment with you in Hell!"

In the play, they also connect themselves to a painting by Francisco Goya called Volaverunt, in which three mysterious figures are flying through the air and supporting a more discernible royal female figure.

== Other representations ==
=== In art ===
Drawings contained in Holinshed's Chronicles, one of the sources Shakespeare used when creating the characters, portray them as members of the upper class. They are wearing elaborate dresses and hairstyles and appear to be noblewomen as Macbeth and Banquo approach. Shakespeare seems to have diverted quite a bit from this image, making the witches (as Banquo says):

withered, and so wild in their attire,
That look not like th' inhabitants o' th' earth ...
each at once her choppy fingers laying
upon her skinny lips. You should be women,
and yet your beards forbid me to interpret
that you are so.

The Three Witches of Macbeth have inspired several painters over the years who have sought to capture the supernatural darkness surrounding Macbeth's encounters with them. For example, by the 18th century, belief in witches had waned in the United Kingdom. Such things were thought to be the simple stories of foreigners, farmers, and superstitious Catholics. However art depicting supernatural subjects was very popular.

John Runciman, as one of the first artists to use Shakespearean characters in his work, created an ink-on-paper drawing entitled The Three Witches in 1767–1768. In it, three ancient figures are shown in close consultation, their heads together and their bodies unshown. Runciman's brother created another drawing of the witches called The Witches show Macbeth The Apparitions painted circa 1771–1772, portraying Macbeth's reaction to the power of the witches' conjured vision. Both brothers' work influenced many later artists by removing the characters from the familiar theatrical setting and placing them in the world of the story.

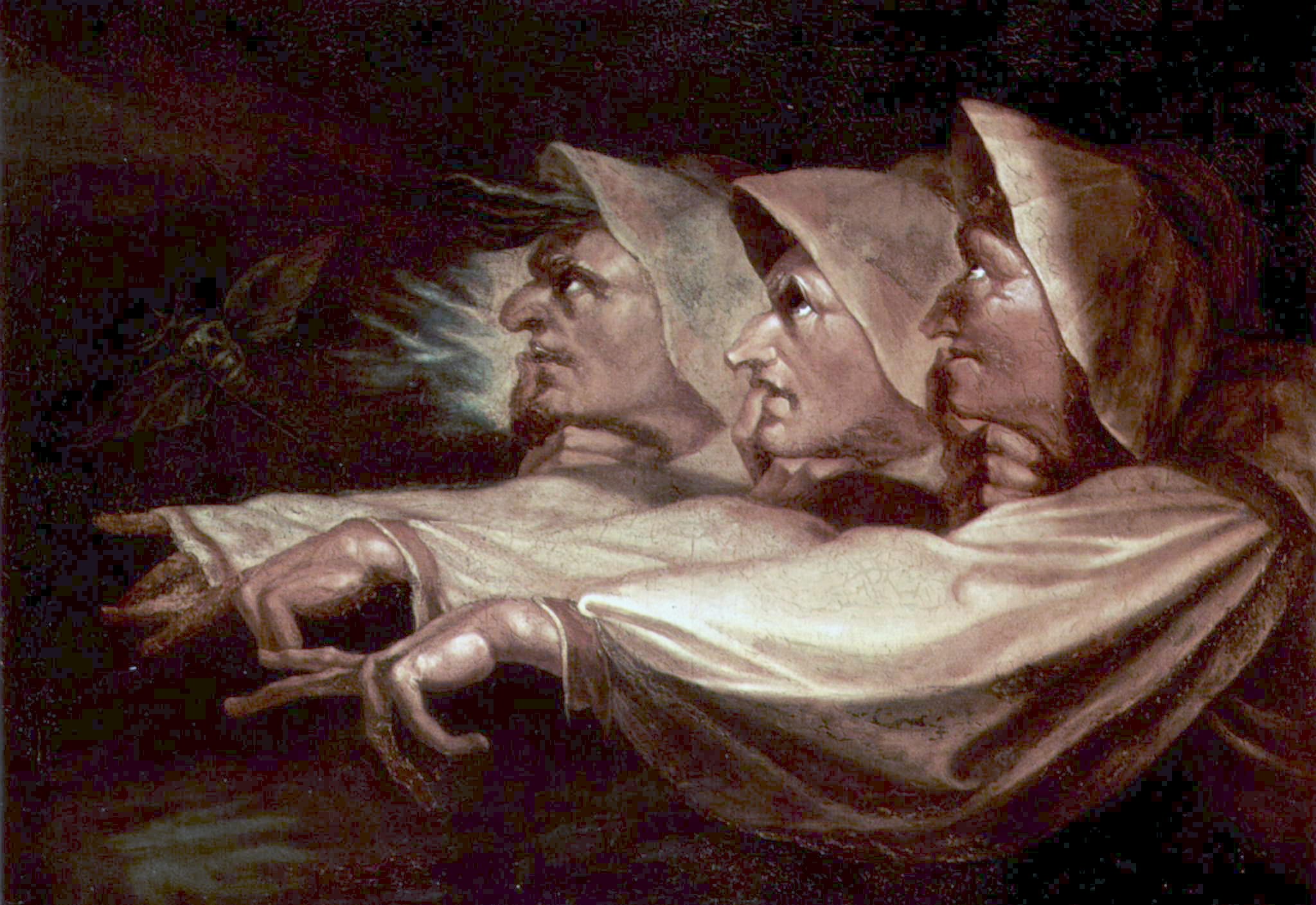
Henry Fuseli's 1783 painting

1791 parody of Fuseli's work by James Gillray

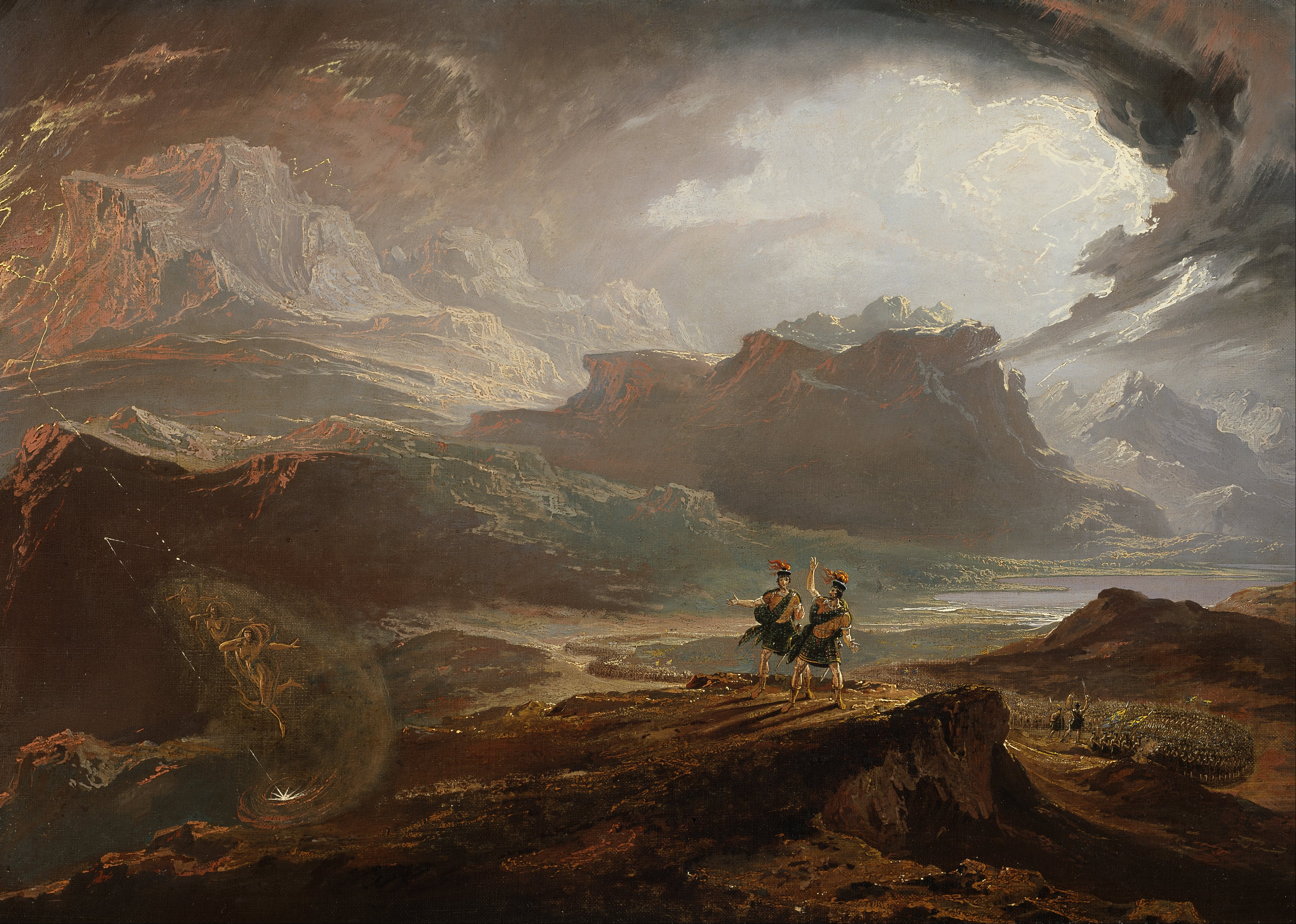
Macbeth by John Martin, 1820. Martin depicts the meeting on the heath as a Romantic landscape

Henry Fuseli would later create one of the more famous portrayals of the Three Witches in 1783, entitled The Weird Sisters or The Three Witches. In it, the witches are lined up and dramatically pointing at something all at once, their faces in profile. This painting was parodied by James Gillray in 1791 in Weird Sisters; Ministers of Darkness; Minions of the Moon. Three figures are lined up with their faces in profile in a way similar to Fuseli's painting. However, the three figures are recognisable as Lord Dundas (the home secretary at the time), William Pitt (prime minister), and Lord Thurlow (Lord Chancellor). The three of them are facing a moon, which contains the profiled faces of George III and Queen Charlotte. The drawing is intended to highlight the insanity of King George and the unusual alliance of the three politicians.

Fuseli created two other works depicting the Three Witches for a Dublin art gallery in 1794. The first, entitled Macbeth, Banquo and the Three Witches was a frustration for him. His earlier paintings of Shakespearean scenes had been done on horizontal canvases, giving the viewer a picture of the scene that was similar to what would have been seen on stage. Woodmason requested vertical paintings, shrinking the space Fuseli had to work with. In this particular painting he uses lightning and other dramatic effects to separate Macbeth and Banquo from the witches more clearly and communicate how unnatural their meeting is. Macbeth and Banquo are both visibly terrified, while the witches are confidently perched atop a mound. Silhouettes of the victorious army of Macbeth can be seen celebrating in the background, but lack of space necessitates the removal of the barren, open landscape seen in Fuseli's earlier paintings for the Boydell Shakespeare Gallery of the same scene.

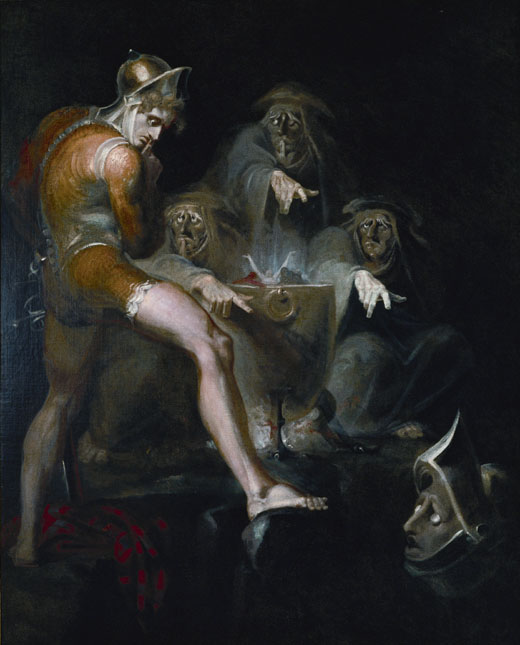
Macbeth and the Armed Head by Fuseli

Fuseli's other Macbeth Woodmason painting Macbeth and the Armed Head depicts a later scene in which Macbeth is shown MacDuff and warned to be wary of him. Fuseli evidently intended the two paintings to be juxtaposed. He said, "when Macbeth meets with the witches on the heath, it is terrible, because he did not expect the supernatural visitation; but when he goes to the cave to ascertain his fate, it is no longer a subject of terror." Fuseli chose to make MacDuff a near-likeness of Macbeth himself, and considered the painting one of his most poetic in that sense, asking,

What would be a greater object of terror to you if, some night on going home, you were to find yourself sitting at your own table [...] would not this make a powerful impression on your mind?

=== In music ===
At least fifteen operas have been based on Macbeth, but only one is regularly performed today. This is Macbeth, composed by Giuseppe Verdi to a libretto by Francesco Maria Piave and premièred in Florence in 1847. In the opera, the Three Witches became a chorus of at least eighteen singers, divided into three groups. Each group enters separately at the start of the opera for the scene with Macbeth and Banquo; after the men's departure, they have a chorus of triumph which does not derive from Shakespeare. They reappear in Act 3, when they conjure up the three apparitions and the procession of kings. When Verdi revised the opera for performance in Paris in 1865, he added a ballet (rarely performed nowadays) to this scene. In it, Hecate, a non-dancing character, mimes instructions to the witches before a final dance and Macbeth's arrival.

In Henry Purcell's opera Dido and Aeneas with libretto by Nahum Tate, the Sorceress addresses the two Enchantresses as "Wayward Sisters," identifying the three of them with the fates, as well as with the malevolent witches of Shakespeare's Macbeth.

=== In literature ===
In Dracula, three vampire women who live in Dracula's castle are often dubbed the "Weird Sisters" by Jonathan Harker and van Helsing, though it is unknown if Bram Stoker intended them to be intentionally quoting Shakespeare. Most media these days just refer to them as the Brides of Dracula, likely to differentiate the characters. In Wyrd Sisters, a Discworld fantasy novel by Terry Pratchett these three witches and the Globe Theater, now named "The Dysk", are featured.

=== In film ===
The Three Witches in Orson Welles' controversial 1948 film adaptation

Orson Welles created a film version of the play in 1948, sometimes called the Übermensch Macbeth, which altered the witches' roles by having them create a voodoo doll of Macbeth in the first scene. Critics take this as a sign that they control his actions completely throughout the film. Their voices are heard, but their faces are never seen, and they carry forked staves as dark parallels to the Celtic cross. Welles' voiceover in the prologue calls them "agents of chaos, priests of hell and magic". At the end of the film, when their work with Macbeth is finished, they cut off the head of his voodoo doll.

Throne of Blood, a Japanese version filmed in 1958 by Akira Kurosawa, replaces the Three Witches with the Forest Spirit, an old hag who sits at her spinning wheel, symbolically entrapping Macbeth's equivalent, Washizu, in the web of his own ambition. She lives outside "The Castle of the Spider's Web", another reference to Macbeth's entanglement in her trap. Behind her hut, Washizu finds piles of rotting bones. The hag, the spinning wheel, and the piles of bones are direct references to the Noh play Adachigahara (also called Kurozuka), one of many artistic elements Kurosawa borrowed from Noh theatre for the film.

Roman Polanski's 1971 film version of Macbeth contained many parallels to his personal life in its graphic and violent depictions. His wife Sharon Tate had been murdered two years earlier by Charles Manson and three women. Many critics saw this as a clear parallel to Macbeth's murders at the urging of the Three Witches within the film.

Scotland, PA, a 2001 parody film directed by Billy Morrissette, sets the play in a restaurant in 1970s Pennsylvania. The witches are replaced by three hippies who give Joe McBeth drug-induced suggestions and prophecies throughout the film using a Magic 8 Ball. After McBeth has killed his boss, Norm Duncan, one of them suggests, "I've got it! Mac should kill McDuff's entire family!" Another hippie sarcastically responds, "Oh, that'll work! Maybe a thousand years ago. You can't go around killing everybody."

In Joel Coen's 2021 film The Tragedy of Macbeth, British actress Kathryn Hunter plays all three witches. Though mostly depicted as three personalities inside a single body, there are several instances where the witch divides into three distinct figures. Hunter worked extensively with Coen to develop a physicality for the witches, describing them as intermediate forms, in between human women and crows (crows are also frequently shown flying through scenes in the film).

=== In computer games ===
In the computer game The Witcher 3: Wild Hunt (2015), the Three Crones of Crookback Bog make an appearance, referred to as the "ladies of the wood" or "the good ladies", called Whispess, Brewess and Weavess. Portrayed as old, grossly deformed women who wield ancient, powerful magic, they are malicious characters, able to shapeshift (among others, into a flock of crows), and pose challenges to the game's protagonists. Within the first half of the game, they confront the titular figure with a prophecy about his ill fate, hinting at the outcome of the game if the player fails at the overarching quest.

== Influence ==
=== Beckett ===
Come and Go, a short play written in 1965 by Samuel Beckett, recalls the Three Witches. The play features only three characters, all women, named Flo, Vi, and Ru. The opening line: "When did we three last meet?" recalls the "When shall we three meet again?" of Macbeth Act 1, Scene 1.

=== Reisert ===
The Third Witch, a 2001 novel written by Rebecca Reisert, tells the story of the play through the eyes of a young girl named Gilly – one of the witches. Gilly seeks Macbeth's death out of revenge for killing her father.

=== Rowling ===
J. K. Rowling has cited the Three Witches as an influence in her Harry Potter series. In an interview with The Leaky Cauldron and MuggleNet, when asked, "What if [Voldemort] never heard the prophecy?", she said, "It's the 'Macbeth' idea. I absolutely adore 'Macbeth'. It is possibly my favourite Shakespeare play. And that's the question isn't it? If Macbeth hadn't met the witches, would he have killed Duncan? Would any of it have happened? Is it fated or did he make it happen? I believe he made it happen." On her website, she referred to Macbeth again in discussing the prophecy: "the prophecy (like the one the witches make to Macbeth, if anyone has read the play of the same name) becomes the catalyst for a situation that would never have occurred if it had not been made."

The soundtrack to the third Harry Potter film features a song by John Williams called "Double Trouble", a reference to the witches' line, "Double double, toil and trouble". The lyrics were adapted from the Three Witches' spell in the play. More playfully, Rowling also invented a musical band popular in the Wizarding world called The Weird Sisters that appears in passing in several books in the series as well as the film adaptation of Harry Potter and the Goblet of Fire.

== See also ==
- Baba Yaga, who can manifest herself as a trio of identical figures
- Les Lavandieres, the Night Washerwomen of Celtic mythology
- Triple Goddess
- Zarqa al Yamama, legendary figure from ancient Arabia who predicted that jungles are moving with her enemies.

== Sources ==
- Bloom, Harold, 1987. William Shakespeare's Macbeth. Yale University: Chelsea House.
- Bernice W, Kliman, 200. Macbeth. Manchester: Manchester University Press, 2nd rev ed. ISBN 0-7190-6229-2
- Shakespeare, William; Cross, Wilbur Lucius (Ed); (2007). Macbeth. Forgotten Books.
