= A Midsummer Night's Dream =

Play by William Shakespeare

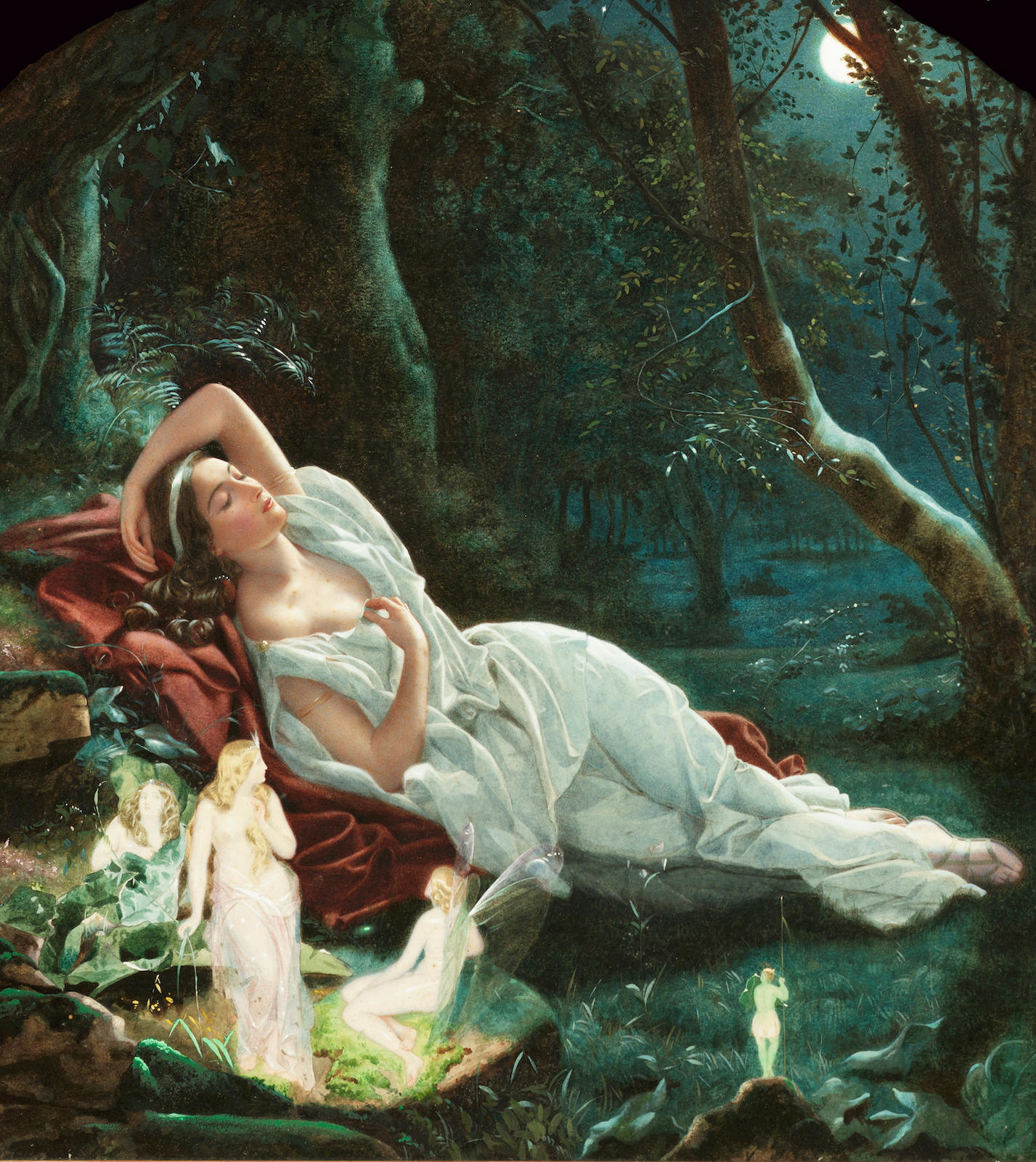
- Titania sleeping in the moonlight protected by her fairies, 19th century painting by John Simmons
- Original language: Early Modern English
- Written by: William Shakespeare
- Characters: Theseus; Hippolyta; Oberon; Titania; Hermia; Lysander; Helena; Demetrius; Nick Bottom; Peter Quince; Francis Flute; Robin Starveling; Tom Snout; Snug; Puck; Egeus; Philostrate
- Genre: Shakespearean comedy English Renaissance theatre
- Setting: Athens

Premiere
- Date: c. 1595–96
- Place: Probably The Theatre, London

A Midsummer Night's Dream is a comedy play written by William Shakespeare between the years 1594 to 1596. The play is set in Athens, and consists of several subplots that revolve around the marriage of Theseus and Hippolyta. One subplot involves a conflict among four Athenian lovers. Another follows a group of six amateur actors rehearsing the play which they are to perform before the wedding. Both groups find themselves in a forest inhabited by fairies who manipulate the humans. The fairies themselves are also in conflict, as the King and Queen of Fairies argue over an Indian changeling boy. A Midsummer Night's Dream is one of Shakespeare's most popular and widely performed plays.

== Characters ==
The Athenians:

- Theseus – Duke of Athens
- Hippolyta – Queen of the Amazons and Theseus' fiancée
- Hermia – in love with Lysander
- Helena – in love with Demetrius
- Lysander – in love with Hermia
- Demetrius – suitor to Hermia
- Egeus – Hermia's father
- Philostrate – Theseus' Master of Revels

The Mechanicals:

- Peter Quince – a carpenter, the director of the play within a play who speaks its prologue
- Nick Bottom – a weaver, plays 'Pyramus' in the play within a play
- Francis Flute – a bellows-mender, plays 'Thisbe'
- Snug – a joiner, plays 'Lion'
- Tom Snout – a tinker, plays 'Wall'
- Robin Starveling – a tailor, plays 'Moonshine'

The Fairies:

- Oberon – King of the Fairies
- Titania – Queen of the Fairies
- Puck – Oberon's knavish sprite
- A Fairy, Peaseblossom, Cobweb, Moth (/moʊt/, m-oh-t), Mustardseed – servants to Titania
- Indian changeling (unseen) – a ward of Titania

== Plot ==
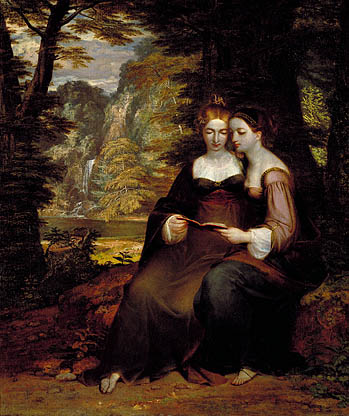
Hermia and Helena by Washington Allston, 1818

A Midsummer Night's Dream consists of several interconnecting plots, connected by a celebration of the wedding of Duke Theseus of Athens and the Amazon queen Hippolyta. Most of the action occurs in the woodland realm of Fairyland, under the light of the moon.

=== Act 1 ===
==== Act 1 Scene 1 ====
The play opens with Theseus and Hippolyta who are four days away from their wedding. Theseus is unhappy about how long he has to wait while Hippolyta thinks it will pass by like a dream. Theseus is confronted by Egeus and his daughter Hermia, who is in love with Lysander, and resistant to her father's demand that she marry Demetrius, whom he has arranged for her to marry. Enraged, Egeus invokes an ancient Athenian law before Duke Theseus, whereby a daughter needs to marry a suitor chosen by her father, or else face death. Theseus offers her another choice: lifelong chastity as a nun worshipping the goddess Diana, but the two lovers both deny his choice and make a secret plan to escape into the forest for Lysander's aunt's house, to run away from Theseus. Hermia tells their plans to Helena, her best friend, who pines unrequitedly for Demetrius, who broke up with her to be with Hermia. Desperate to reclaim Demetrius's love, Helena tells Demetrius about the plan and he follows them in hopes of finding Hermia.

==== Act 1 Scene 2 ====
The mechanicals, Peter Quince and fellow players Nick Bottom, Francis Flute, Robin Starveling, Tom Snout and Snug, plan to put on a play for the wedding of the Duke and the Queen, "the most lamentable comedy and most cruel death of Pyramus and Thisbe". Quince reads the names of characters and bestows them on the players. Nick Bottom, who is playing the main role of Pyramus, is over-enthusiastic and wants to dominate others by suggesting himself for the characters of Thisbe, the Lion, and Pyramus at the same time. Quince insists that Bottom can only play the role of Pyramus. Bottom would also rather play a tyrant and recites some lines of Ercles. Bottom is told by Quince that he would play the Lion so terribly as to frighten the duchess and other ladies so much that the Duke and Lords would have the players hanged. Snug remarks that he needs Lion's part because he is "slow of study". Quince assures Snug that the role of the lion is "nothing but roaring." Quince then ends the meeting by telling his actors "At the Duke's oak we meet".

=== Act 2 ===
==== Act 2 Scene 1 ====
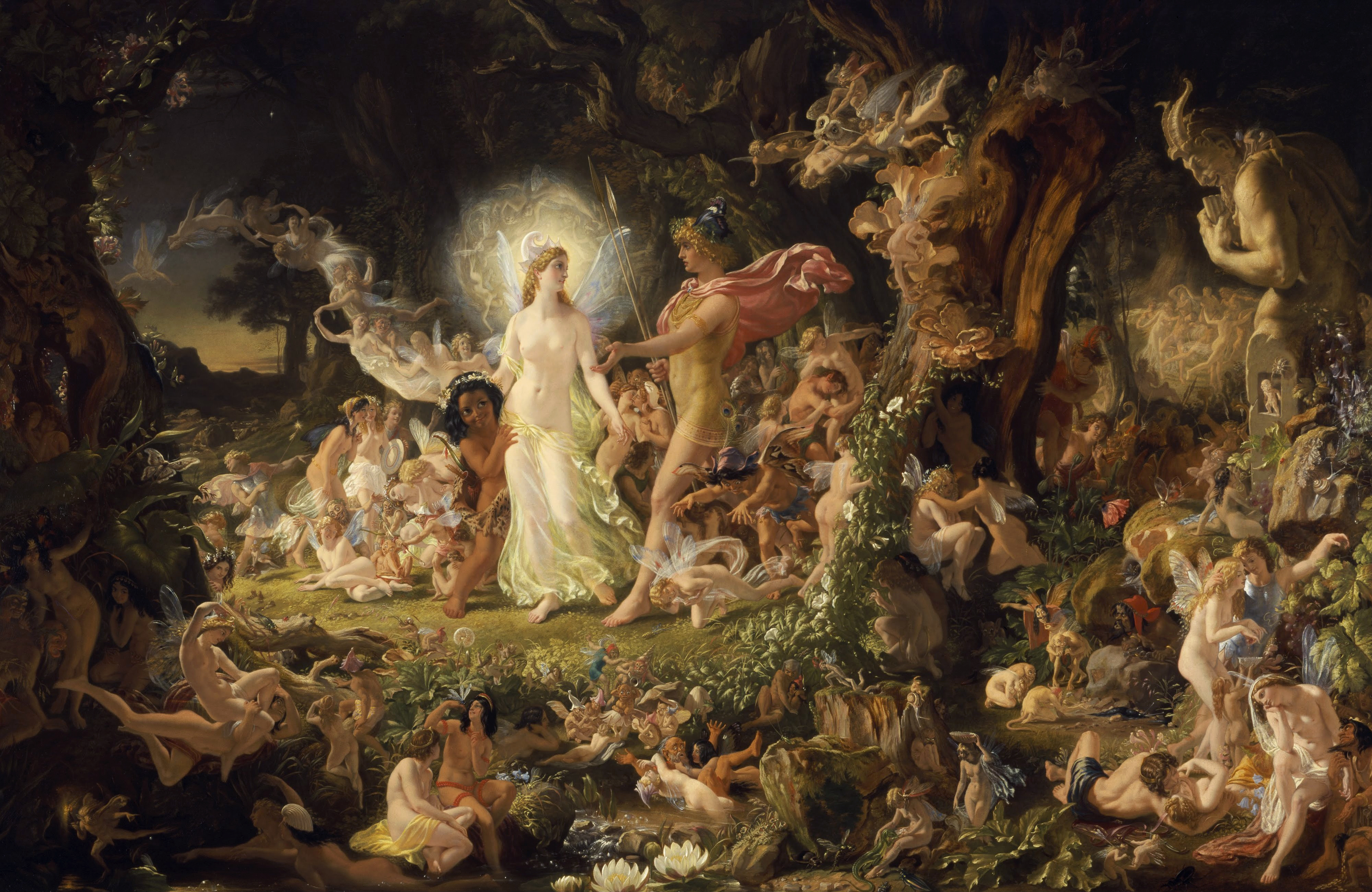
The Quarrel of Oberon and Titania by Joseph Noel Paton, 1849

In a parallel plot line, at the same time, Oberon, king of the fairies, and Titania, his queen, have come to the forest outside Athens. Titania tells Oberon that she plans to stay there until she has attended Theseus and Hippolyta's wedding. Oberon and Titania are estranged because Titania refuses to give her Indian changeling to Oberon for use as his "knight" or "henchman" since the child's mother was one of Titania's worshippers. Oberon seeks to punish Titania. He calls upon Robin "Puck" Goodfellow, his "shrewd and knavish sprite", to help him concoct a magical juice derived from a flower called "love-in-idleness", which turns from white to purple when struck by Cupid's arrow. When the concoction is applied to the eyelids of a sleeping person, that person, upon waking, falls in love with the first living thing they perceive. He instructs Puck to retrieve the flower with the hope that he might make Titania fall in love with an animal of the forest and thereby shame her into giving up the little Indian boy. He says, "And ere I take this charm from off her sight, / As I can take it with another herb, / I'll make her render up her page to me." Helena and Demetrius enter, with her continuously making advances towards Demetrius, promising to love him more than Hermia. However, he rebuffs her with cruel insults. Observing this, Oberon orders Puck to spread some of the magical juice from the flower on the eyelids of the young Athenian man.

==== Act 2 Scene 2 ====
As Titania is lulled to sleep by her fairies, Oberon sneaks up and places the flower juice on her eyes, exiting the stage afterwards. Lysander and Hermia enter, lost and exhausted from the journey. Hermia rejects Lysander's advances to sleep together, and the two lie down on different corners. Puck enters and mistakes Lysander for Demetrius, not having seen either before, and administers the juice to the sleeping Lysander. Helena, coming across him, wakes him while attempting to determine whether he is dead or asleep. Upon this happening, Lysander immediately falls in love with Helena. Helena, mistakenly accusing Lysander of mocking her, runs away. Lysander follows her. When Hermia wakes up after dreaming a snake ate her heart, she sees that Lysander is gone and goes out in the woods to find him.

=== Act 3 ===
==== Act 3 Scene 1 ====
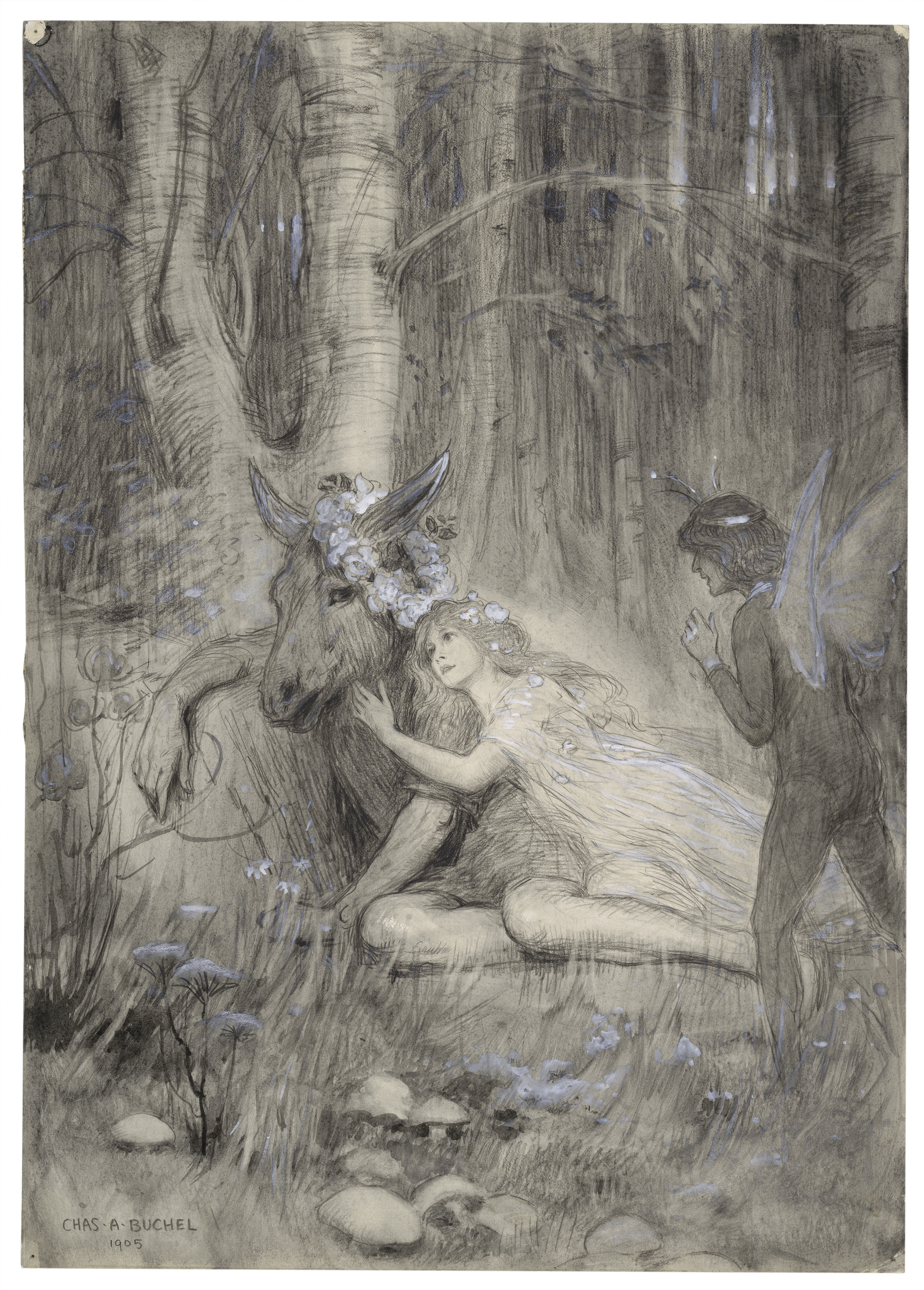
A drawing of Puck, Titania and Bottom in A Midsummer Night's Dream from Act III, Scene II by Charles Buchel, 1905

Meanwhile, Quince and his band of five labourers ("rude mechanicals", as Puck describes them) have arranged to perform their play about Pyramus and Thisbe for Theseus's wedding and venture into the forest, near Titania's bower, for their rehearsal. Quince leads the actors in their rehearsal of the play. Bottom is spotted by Puck, who (taking his name to be another word for a jackass) transforms his head into that of a donkey. When Bottom returns for his next lines, the other workmen run screaming in terror: They claim that they are haunted, much to Bottom's confusion. Determined to await his friends, he begins to sing to himself. Titania, having received the love potion, is awakened by Bottom's singing and immediately falls in love with him. (In the words of the play, "Titania waked, and straightway loved an ass.") She lavishes him with her attention and that of her fairies; while she is in this state of devotion, Oberon takes the changeling boy.

==== Act 3 Scene 2 ====
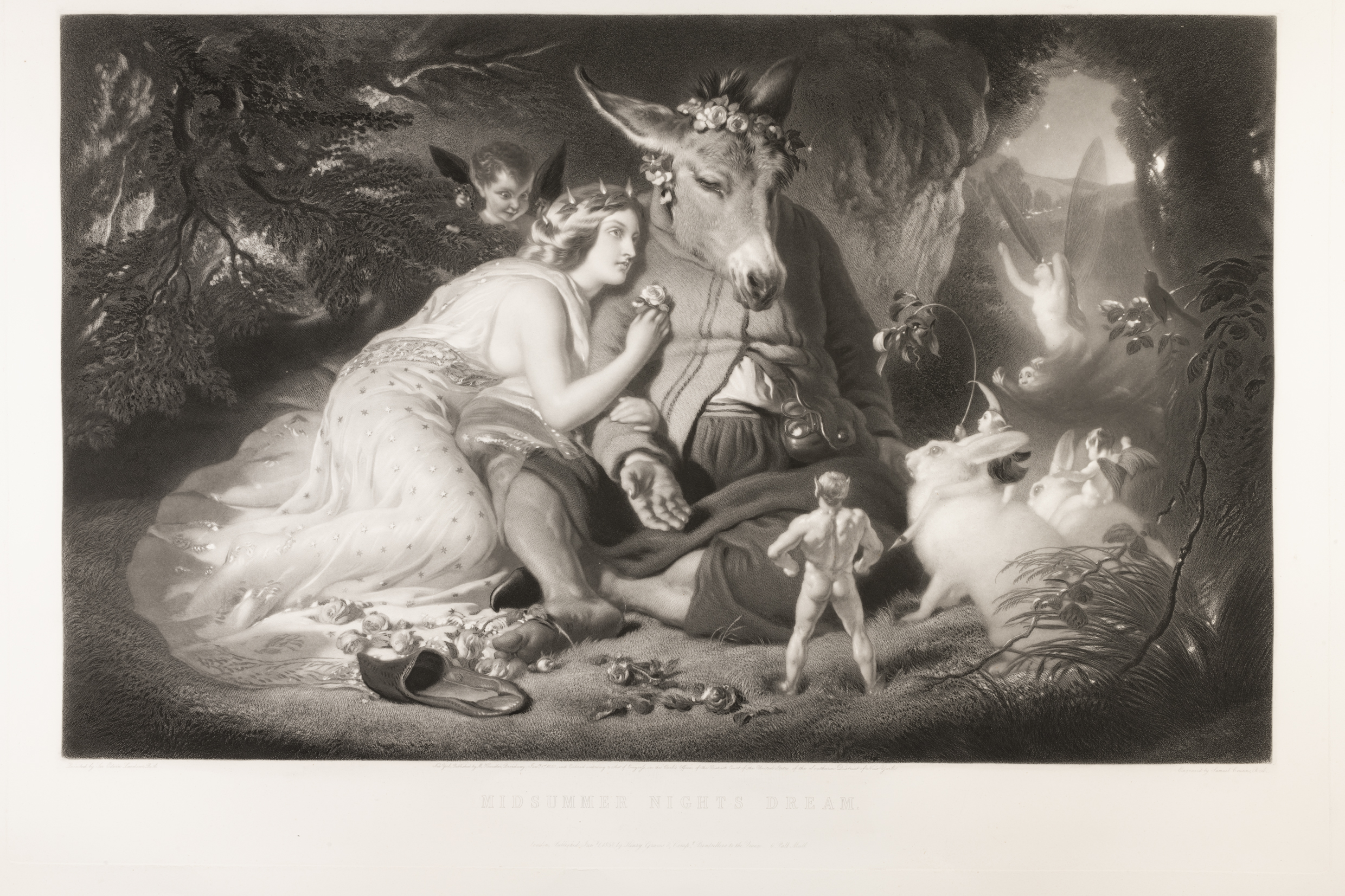
A print by Samuel Cousins reproducing an Edwin Landseer painting depicting Titania affectionately leaning on Bottom.

Oberon sees Demetrius still following Hermia. When Demetrius goes to sleep, Oberon condemns Puck's mistake and sends him to get Helena while he charms Demetrius's eyes. Upon waking, Demetrius sees Helena arguing with Lysander, and instantly falls in love with her. Now under the spell, the two men are both in love with a Helena convinced that both of her two suitors are mocking her, as neither loved her originally. Hermia finds Lysander and asks why he left her, but Lysander claims he never loved Hermia, instead loving Helena. This soon turns into a quarrel between the two ladies, with Helena chiding Hermia for joining in the mockery session, followed by the latter furiously charging at her for stealing her true love's heart and blaming her for the supposed 'mockery'. Oberon and Puck decide that they must resolve this conflict, and by the morning, none of them will have any memory of what happened, as if it were a dream. Oberon arranges everything so Helena, Hermia, Demetrius, and Lysander will all believe they have been dreaming when they awaken. Puck distracts Lysander and Demetrius from fighting over Helena's love by mimicking their voices and leading them apart. Eventually, all four find themselves separately falling asleep in the glade. Once they fall asleep, Puck administers the antidote to Lysander, returning his love to Hermia again. Once they awaken, the lovers assume that whatever happened was a dream and not reality.

=== Act 4 ===
==== Act 4 Scene 1 ====
Having achieved his goals, Oberon releases Titania and orders Puck to remove the donkey's head from Bottom. The fairies then disappear, and Theseus and Hippolyta arrive on the scene, during an early morning hunt. They find the lovers still sleeping in the glade. They wake up the lovers and, since Demetrius no longer loves Hermia, Theseus over-rules Egeus's demands and arranges a group wedding. The lovers at first believe they are still in a dream and cannot recall what has happened. The lovers decide that the night's events must have been a dream, as they walk back to Athens. After they exit, Bottom awakes, and he too decides that he must have experienced a dream "past the wit of man" and declares that he will get Peter Quince to write a Ballad of the previous night's dream. Fittingly called "Bottom's Dream", Bottom decides that he will sing the ballad after the end of their play, when Thisbe dies.

==== Act 4 Scene 2 ====
At Quince's house, Quince and his team of actors worry that Bottom has gone missing. Quince laments that Bottom is the only man who can take on the lead role of Pyramus. Bottom returns and the actors get ready to put on "Pyramus and Thisbe".

=== Act 5 ===
In the final scene of the play, Theseus, Hippolyta and the lovers watch the six workmen perform Pyramus and Thisbe in Athens. The mechanicals are so terrible at playing their roles that the guests laugh as if it were meant to be a comedy, and everyone retires to bed. Afterwards, Oberon, Titania, Puck, and other fairies enter, and bless the house and its occupants with good fortune. After all the other characters leave, Puck "restores amends" and suggests that what the audience experienced might just be a dream.

== Sources ==
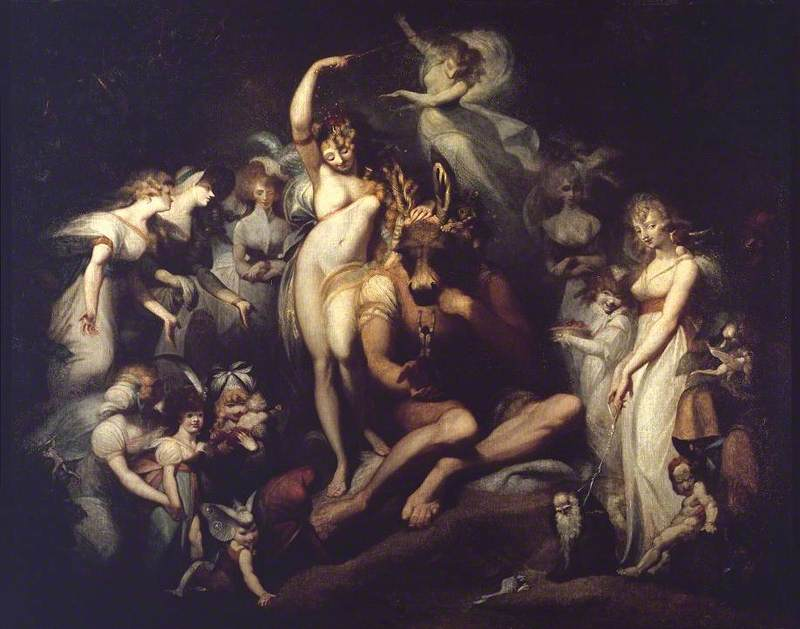
Titania and Bottom, Henry Fuseli (c.1790)

It is unknown exactly when A Midsummer Night's Dream was written or first performed, but on the basis of topical references and an allusion to Edmund Spenser's Epithalamion, it is usually dated 1595 or early 1596. Some have theorised that the play might have been written for an aristocratic wedding (for example that of Thomas Berkeley and Elizabeth Carey), while others suggest that it was written for the Queen to celebrate the feast day of St. John, but no evidence exists to support this theory. In any case, it would have been performed at The Theatre and, later, The Globe. Though it is not a translation or adaptation of an earlier work, various sources such as Ovid's Metamorphoses and Chaucer's "The Knight's Tale" served as inspiration. Aristophanes' classical Greek comedy The Birds (also set in the countryside near Athens) has been proposed as a source due to the fact that both Procne and Titania are awakened by male characters (Hoopoe and Bottom the Weaver) who have animal heads and who sing two-stanza songs about birds. According to John Twyning, the play's plot of four lovers undergoing a trial in the woods was intended as a "riff" on Der Busant, a Middle High German poem.

According to Dorothea Kehler, the writing period can be placed between 1594 and 1596, which means that Shakespeare had probably already completed Romeo and Juliet and was still in contemplation of The Merchant of Venice. The play belongs to the author's early-middle period, a time when Shakespeare devoted primary attention to the lyricism of his works.

== Date and text ==
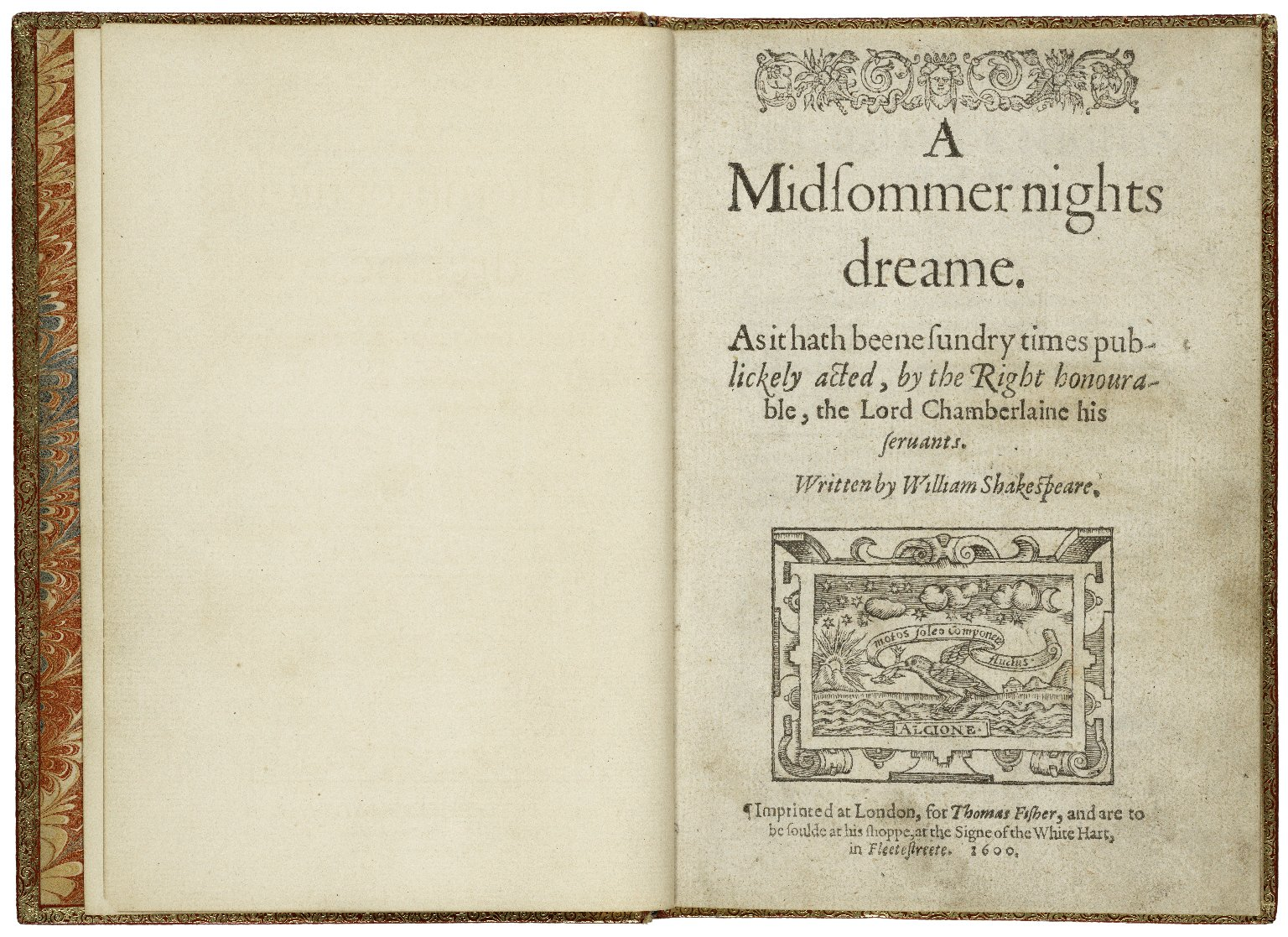
The title page from the first quarto, printed in 1600

The play was entered into the Register of the Stationers' Company on 8 October 1600 by the bookseller Thomas Fisher, who published the first quarto edition later that year. A second quarto was printed in 1619 by William Jaggard, as part of his so-called False Folio. The play next appeared in print in the First Folio of 1623. The title page of Q1 states that the play was "sundry times publickely acted" prior to 1600. According to Sukanta Chaudhuri, editor of the 2017 Arden edition of A Midsummer Night's Dream, "The only firm evidence for the date of Dream is its mention in Francis Meres's Palladis Tamia, which appeared in 1598" (p. 283). Chaudhuri's exhaustive investigation of its original date of performance points to 1595 or 1596 (likely for the wedding of either William Stanley, 6th Earl of Derby to Elizabeth de Vere, or Thomas Berkeley, son of Henry Lord Berkeley, to Elizabeth Carey) (p. 284-5). Further consolidations of this late Elizabethan date are provided by "Oberon's unmissable compliment to Queen Elizabeth (2.1.155-164)" (Chaudhuri), and Titania's description of flooded fields and failed crops which occurred through England in the years 1594-m–1597/8 (2.1.84-121). One scholar connects Titania's description of summer-green corn rotting in the fields to accounts of the rainy summer of 1596. The first court performance known with certainty occurred at Hampton Court on 1 January 1604, as a prelude to The Masque of Indian and China Knights.

== Themes ==
=== Lovers' bliss ===
In Ancient Greece, long before the creation of the Christian celebrations of St. John's Day, the summer solstice was marked by Adonia, a festival to mourn the death of Adonis, the devoted mortal lover of the goddess Aphrodite. According to Ovid's Metamorphoses, Aphrodite took the orphaned infant Adonis to the underworld to be raised by Persephone. He grew to be a beautiful young man, and when Aphrodite returned to retrieve him, Persephone did not want to let him go. Zeus settled the dispute by giving Adonis one-third of the year with Persephone, one-third of the year with Aphrodite, and the remaining third where he chose. Adonis chose to spend two-thirds of the year with his paramour, Aphrodite. He bled to death in his lover's arms after being gored by a boar. Mythology has various stories attributing the colour of certain flowers to staining by the blood of Adonis or Aphrodite.

The story of Venus and Adonis was well known to the Elizabethans and inspired many works, including Shakespeare's own hugely popular narrative poem, Venus and Adonis, written while London's theatres were closed because of plague. It was published in 1593.

The wedding of Theseus and Hippolyta and the mistaken and waylaid lovers, Titania and Bottom, even the erstwhile acting troupe, model various aspects (and forms) of love.

=== Carnivalesque ===
Both David Wiles of the University of London and Harold Bloom of Yale University have strongly endorsed the reading of this play under the themes of Carnivalesque, Bacchanalia, and Saturnalia. Writing in 1998, David Wiles stated that: "The starting point for my own analysis will be the proposition that although we encounter A Midsummer Night's Dream as a text, it was historically part of an aristocratic carnival. It was written for a wedding, and part of the festive structure of the wedding night. The audience who saw the play in the public theatre in the months that followed became vicarious participants in an aristocratic festival from which they were physically excluded. My purpose will be to demonstrate how closely the play is integrated with a historically specific upper-class celebration." Wiles argued in 1993 that the play was written to celebrate the Carey-Berkeley wedding. The date of the wedding was fixed to coincide with a conjunction of Venus and the new moon, highly propitious for conceiving an heir.

=== Love ===
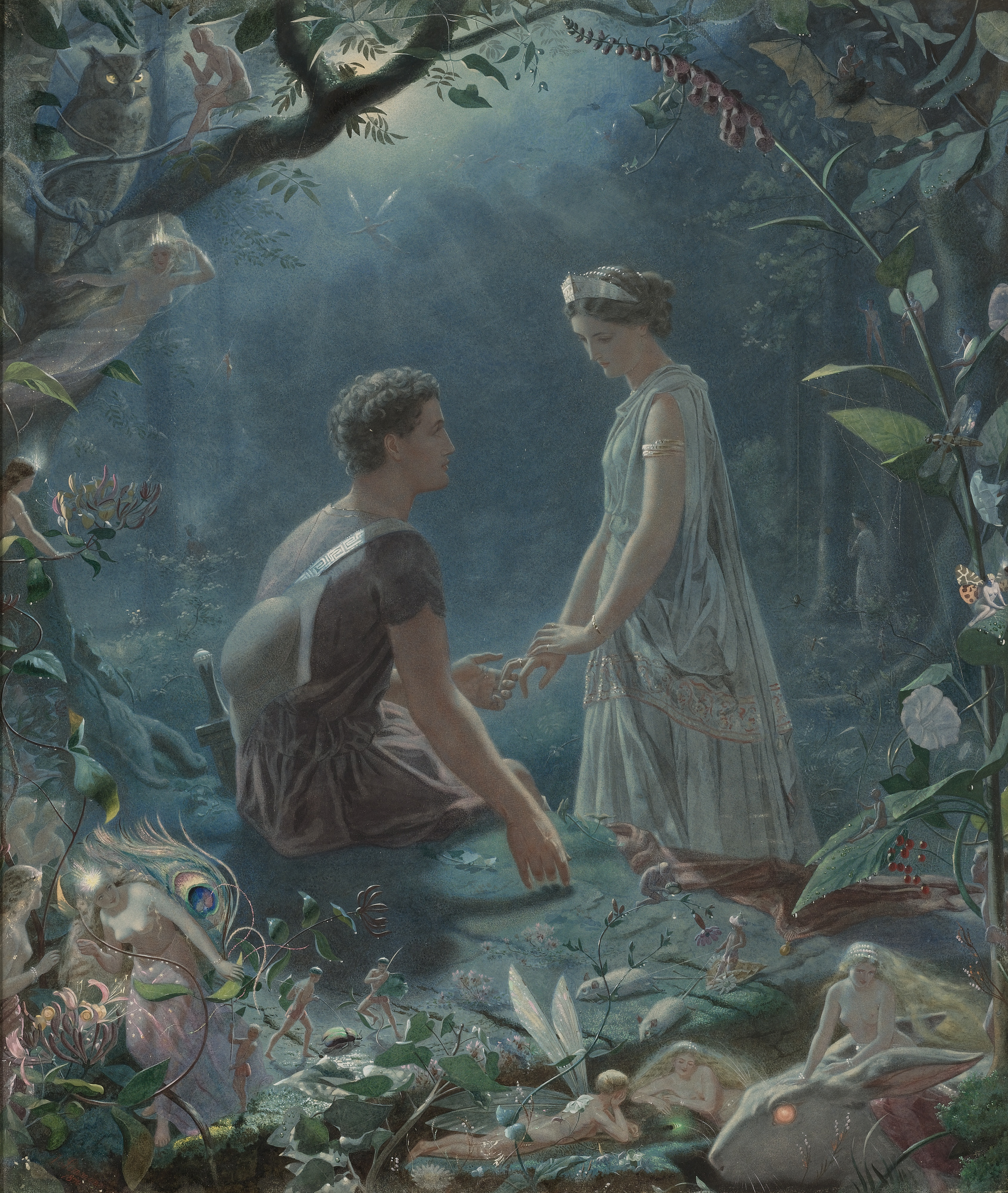
Hermia and Lysander by John Simmons (1870)

David Bevington argues that the play represents the dark side of love. He writes that the fairies make light of love by mistaking the lovers and by applying a love potion to Queen Titania's eyes, forcing her to fall in love with an ass. In the forest, both couples are beset by problems. Hermia and Lysander are both met by Puck, who provides some comic relief in the play by confounding the four lovers in the forest. However, the play also alludes to serious themes. At the end of the play, Hippolyta and Theseus, happily married, watch the play about the unfortunate lovers, Pyramus and Thisbe, and are able to enjoy and laugh at it. Helena and Demetrius are both oblivious to the dark side of their love, totally unaware of what may have come of the events in the forest.

=== Problem with time ===
There is a dispute over the scenario of the play as it is cited at first by Theseus that "four happy days bring in another moon". The wood episode then takes place at a night of no Moon, but Lysander asserts that "there will be so much light in the very night they will escape that dew on the grass will be shining like liquid pearls." Also, in the next scene, Quince states that they will rehearse in moonlight, which creates a real confusion. It is possible that the Moon set during the night allowing Lysander to escape in the moonlight and for the actors to rehearse, then for the wood episode to occur without moonlight. Theseus's statement can also be interpreted to mean "four days until the next month". Another possibility is that, since each month there are roughly four consecutive nights that the Moon is not seen due to its closeness to the Sun in the sky (the two nights before the moment of new moon, followed by the two following it), it may in this fashion indicate a liminal "dark of the moon" period full of magical possibilities. This is further supported by Hippolyta's opening lines exclaiming "And then the moon, like to a silver bow / New-bent in heaven, shall behold the night of our solemnities"; the thin crescent-shaped moon being the hallmark of the new moon's return to the skies each month. The play also intertwines the Midsummer Eve of the title with May Day, furthering the idea of a confusion of time and the seasons. This is evidenced by Theseus commenting on some slumbering youths, that they "observe The rite of May".

=== Loss of individual identity ===
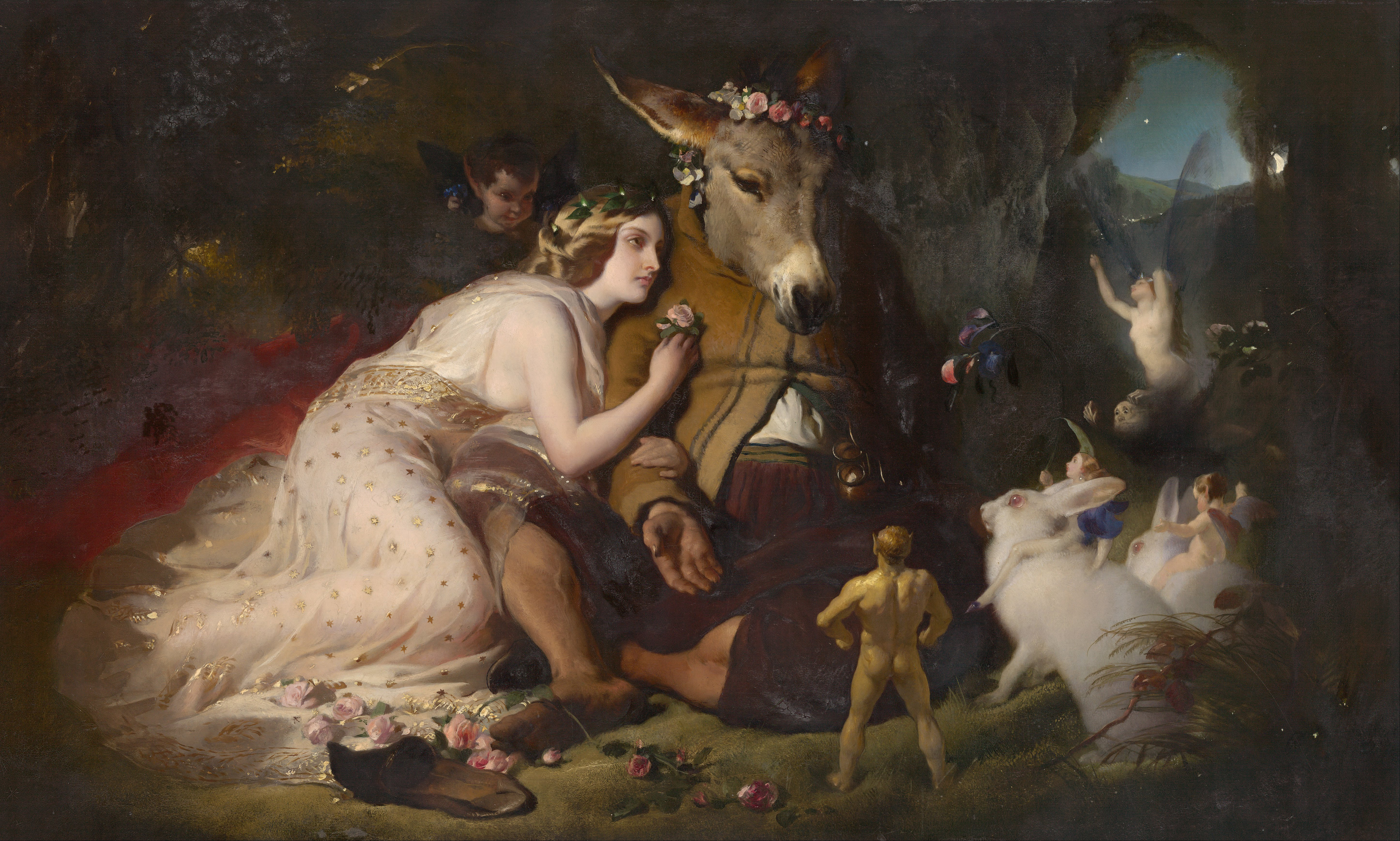
Edwin Landseer, Scene from A Midsummer Night's Dream. Titania and Bottom (1848)

Maurice Hunt, former Chair of the English Department at Baylor University, writes of the blurring of the identities of fantasy and reality in the play that make possible "that pleasing, narcotic dreaminess associated with the fairies of the play". By emphasising this theme, even in the setting of the play, Shakespeare prepares the reader's mind to accept the fantastic reality of the fairy world and its happenings. This also seems to be the axis around which the plot conflicts in the play occur. Hunt suggests that it is the breaking down of individual identities that leads to the central conflict in the story. It is the brawl between Oberon and Titania, based on a lack of recognition for the other in the relationship, that drives the rest of the drama in the story and makes it dangerous for any of the other lovers to come together due to the disturbance of Nature caused by a fairy dispute. Similarly, this failure to identify and to distinguish is what leads Puck to mistake one set of lovers for another in the forest, placing the flower's juice on Lysander's eyes instead of Demetrius'.

Victor Kiernan, a Marxist scholar and historian, writes that it is for the greater sake of love that this loss of identity takes place and that individual characters are made to suffer accordingly: "It was the more extravagant cult of love that struck sensible people as irrational, and likely to have dubious effects on its acolytes." He believes that identities in the play are not so much lost as they are blended together to create a type of haze through which distinction becomes nearly impossible. It is driven by a desire for new and more practical ties between characters as a means of coping with the strange world within the forest, even in relationships as diverse and seemingly unrealistic as the brief love between Titania and Bottom: "It was the tidal force of this social need that lent energy to relationships."

The aesthetics scholar David Marshall draws out this theme even further by noting that the loss of identity reaches its fullness in the description of the mechanicals and their assumption of other identities. In describing the occupations of the acting troupe, he writes "Two construct or put together, two mend and repair, one weaves and one sews. All join together what is apart or mend what has been rent, broken, or sundered." In Marshall's opinion, this loss of individual identity not only blurs specificities, it creates new identities found in community, which Marshall points out may lead to some understanding of Shakespeare's opinions on love and marriage. Further, the mechanicals understand this theme as they take on their individual parts for a corporate performance of Pyramus and Thisbe. Marshall remarks that "To be an actor is to double and divide oneself, to discover oneself in two parts: both oneself and not oneself, both the part and not the part." He claims that the mechanicals understand this and that each character, particularly among the lovers, has a sense of laying down individual identity for the greater benefit of the group or pairing. It seems that a desire to lose one's individuality and find identity in the love of another is what quietly moves the events of A Midsummer Night's Dream. As the primary sense of motivation, this desire is reflected even in the scenery depictions and the story's overall mood.

=== Ambiguous sexuality ===
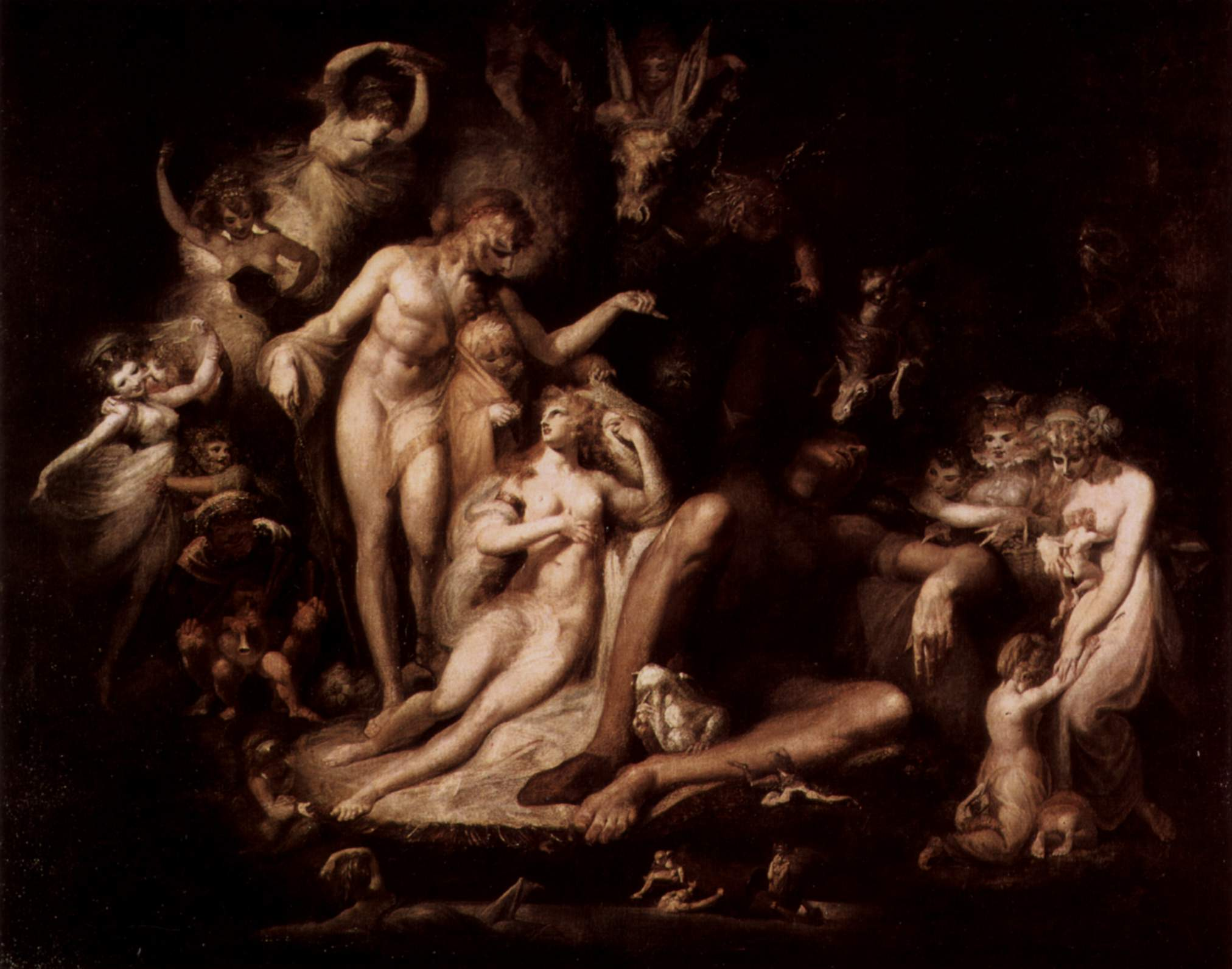
The Awakening of the Fairy Queen Titania

In his essay "Preposterous Pleasures: Queer Theories and A Midsummer Night's Dream", Douglas E. Green explores possible interpretations of alternative sexuality that he finds within the text of the play, in juxtaposition to the proscribed social mores of the culture at the time the play was written. He writes that his essay "does not (seek to) rewrite A Midsummer Night's Dream as a gay play but rather explores some of its 'homoerotic significations' ... moments of 'queer' disruption and eruption in this Shakespearean comedy."

Green does not consider Shakespeare to have been a "sexual radical", but that the play represented a "topsy-turvy world" or "temporary holiday" that mediates or negotiates the "discontents of civilisation", which while resolved neatly in the story's conclusion, do not resolve so neatly in real life. Green writes that the "sodomitical elements", "homoeroticism", "lesbianism", and even "compulsory heterosexuality"—the first hint of which may be Oberon's obsession with Titania's changeling ward—in the story must be considered in the context of the "culture of early modern England" as a commentary on the "aesthetic rigidities of comic form and political ideologies of the prevailing order".

=== Gender roles ===
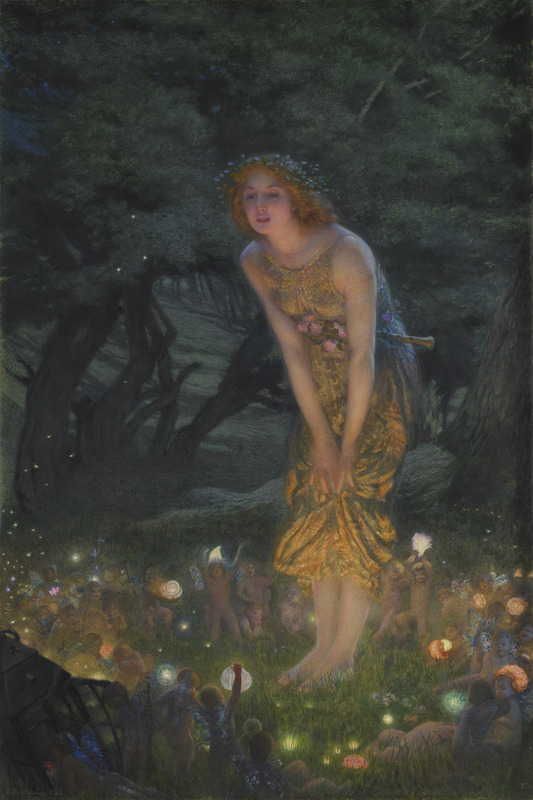
Midsummer Eve by Edward Robert Hughes c. 1908

Male dominance is one thematic element found in the play. In A Midsummer Night's Dream, Lysander and Hermia escape into the woods for a night where they do not fall under the laws of Theseus or Egeus. Upon their arrival in Athens, the couples are married. Marriage is seen as the ultimate social achievement for women while men can go on to do many other great things and gain social recognition. In The Imperial Votaress, Louis Montrose draws attention to male and female gender roles and norms present in the comedy in connection with Elizabethan culture. In reference to the triple wedding, he says, "The festive conclusion in A Midsummer Night's Dream depends upon the success of a process by which the feminine pride and power manifested in Amazon warriors, possessive mothers, unruly wives, and wilful daughters are brought under the control of lords and husbands." He says that the consummation of marriage is how power over a woman changes hands from father to husband. A connection is drawn between flowers and sexuality. Montrose sees the juice employed by Oberon as symbolising menstrual blood as well as the "sexual blood shed by 'virgins'". While blood as a result of menstruation is representative of a woman's power, blood as a result of a first sexual encounter represents man's power over women.

There are points in the play, however, when there is an absence of patriarchal control. In his book Power on Display, Leonard Tennenhouse says the problem in A Midsummer Night's Dream is the problem of "authority gone archaic". The Athenian law requiring a daughter to die if she does not do her father's will is outdated. Tennenhouse contrasts the patriarchal rule of Theseus in Athens with that of Oberon in the carnivalistic Faerie world. The disorder in the land of the fairies completely opposes the world of Athens. He states that during times of carnival and festival, male power is broken down. For example, what happens to the four lovers in the woods as well as Bottom's dream represents chaos that contrasts with Theseus' political order. However, Theseus does not punish the lovers for their disobedience. According to Tennenhouse, by forgiving the lovers, he has made a distinction between the law of the patriarch (Egeus) and that of the monarch (Theseus), creating two different voices of authority. This can be compared to the time of Elizabeth I, in which monarchs were seen as having two bodies: the body natural and the body politic. Tennenhouse says that Elizabeth's succession itself represented both the voice of a patriarch and the voice of a monarch: (1) her father's will, which stated that the crown should pass to her and (2) the fact that she was the daughter of a king.

== Criticism ==
=== Critical history ===
==== 17th century ====
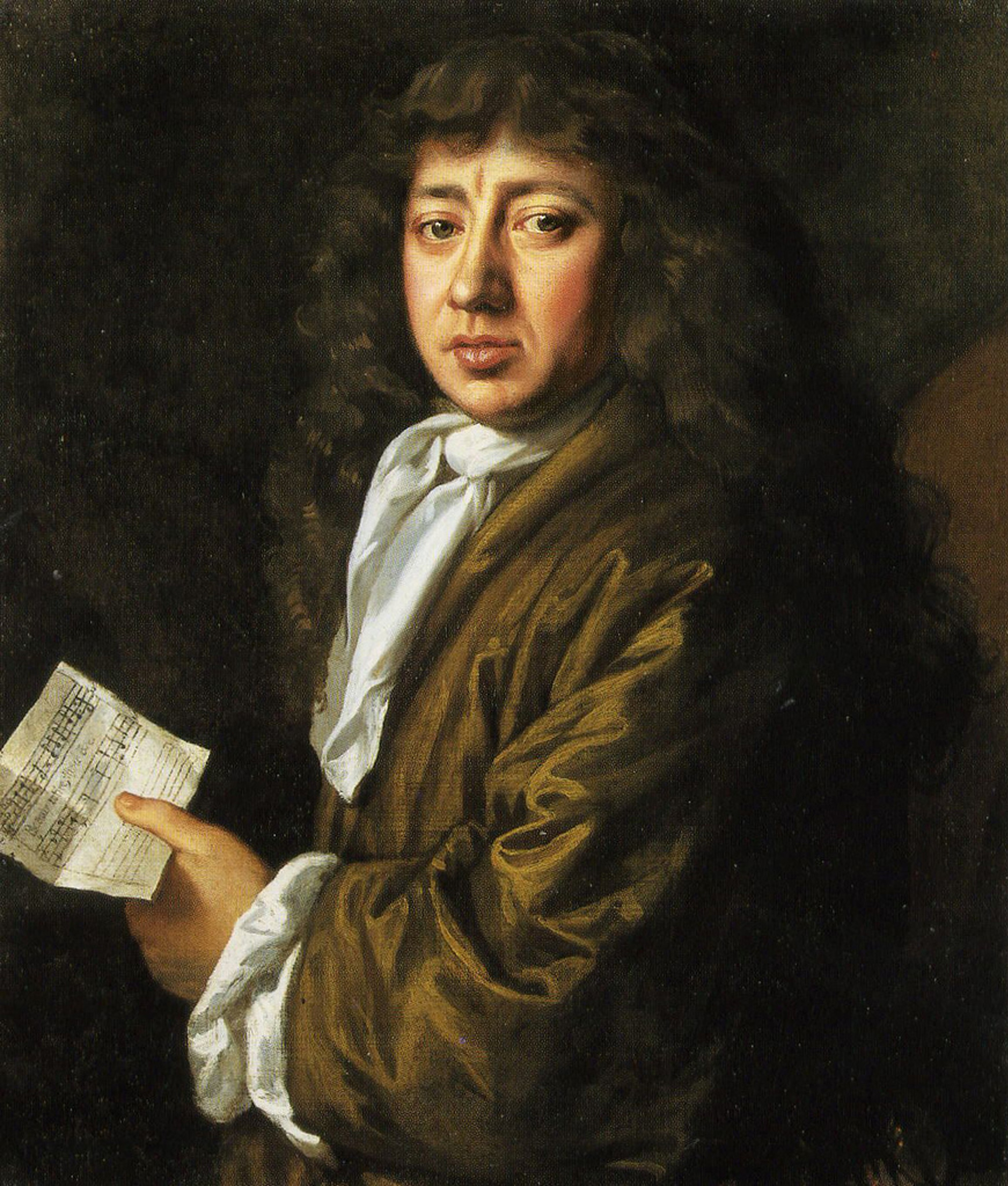
Samuel Pepys, who wrote the oldest known comments on the play, found A Midsummer Night's Dream to be "the most insipid ridiculous play that ever I saw in my life".

Dorothea Kehler has attempted to trace the criticism of the work through the centuries. The earliest such piece of criticism that she found was a 1662 entry in the diary of Samuel Pepys. He found the play to be "the most insipid ridiculous play that ever I saw in my life". He did, however, admit that it had "some good dancing and some handsome women, which was all my pleasure".

The next critic known to comment on the play was John Dryden, writing The Authors Apology for Heroique Poetry; and Poetique Licence in 1677. He was preoccupied with the question of whether fairies should be depicted in theatrical plays, since they did not exist. He concluded that poets should be allowed to depict things which do not exist but derive from popular belief. And fairies are of this sort, as are pygmies and the extraordinary effects of magic. Based on this reasoning, Dryden defended the merits of three fantasy plays: A Midsummer Night's Dream, The Tempest, and Ben Jonson's The Masque of Queens.

==== 18th century ====
Charles Gildon in the early 18th century recommended this play for its beautiful reflections, descriptions, similes, and topics. Gildon thought that Shakespeare drew inspiration from the works of Ovid and Virgil, and that he could read them in the original Latin and not in later translations.

William Duff, writing in the 1770s, also recommended this play. He felt the depiction of the supernatural was among Shakespeare's strengths, not weaknesses. He especially praised the poetry and wit of the fairies, and the quality of the verse involved. His contemporary Francis Gentleman, an admirer of Shakespeare, was much less appreciative of this play. He felt that the poetry, the characterisation, and the originality of the play were its strengths, but that its major weaknesses were a "puerile" plot and that it consists of an odd mixture of incidents. The connection of the incidents to each other seemed rather forced to Gentleman.

Edmond Malone, a Shakespearean scholar and critic of the late 18th century, found another supposed flaw in this particular play, its lack of a proper decorum. He found that the "more exalted characters" (the aristocrats of Athens) are subservient to the interests of those beneath them. In other words, the lower-class characters play larger roles than their betters and overshadow them. He found this to be a grave error of the writer. Malone thought that this play had to be an early and immature work of Shakespeare and, by implication, that an older writer would know better. Malone's main argument seems to derive from the classism of his era. He assumes that the aristocrats had to receive more attention in the narrative and to be more important, more distinguished, and better than the lower class.

==== 19th century ====
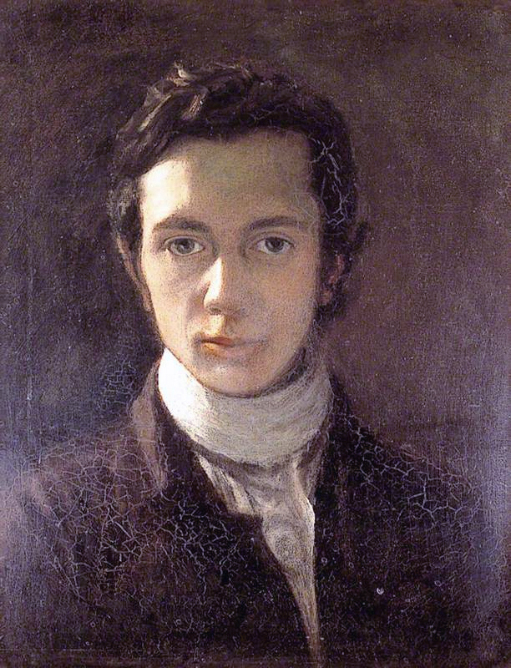
William Hazlitt preferred reading A Midsummer Night's Dream over watching it acted on stage.

According to Kehler, significant 19th-century criticism began in 1808 with August Wilhelm Schlegel. Schlegel perceived unity in the multiple plot lines. He noted that the donkey's head is not a random transformation, but reflects Bottom's true nature. He identified the tale of Pyramus and Thisbe as a burlesque of the Athenian lovers. In 1817, William Hazlitt found the play to be better as a written work than a staged production. He found the work to be "a delightful fiction" but when staged, it is reduced to a dull pantomime. He concluded that poetry and the stage do not fit together. Kehler finds the comment to be more of an indication of the quality of the theatrical productions available to Hazlitt, rather than a true indication of the play's supposed unsuitability to the stage. She notes that prior to the 1840s, all stage productions of this play were adaptations unfaithful to the original text.

In 1811–1812, Samuel Taylor Coleridge made two points of criticism about this play. The first was that the entire play should be seen as a dream. Second, that Helena is guilty of "ungrateful treachery" to Hermia. He thought that this was a reflection of the lack of principles in women, who are more likely to follow their own passions and inclinations than men. Women, in his view, feel less abhorrence for moral evil, though they are concerned with its outward consequences. Coleridge was probably the earliest critic to introduce gender issues to the analysis of this play. Kehler dismisses his views on Helena as indications of Coleridge's own misogyny, rather than genuine reflections of Helena's morality.

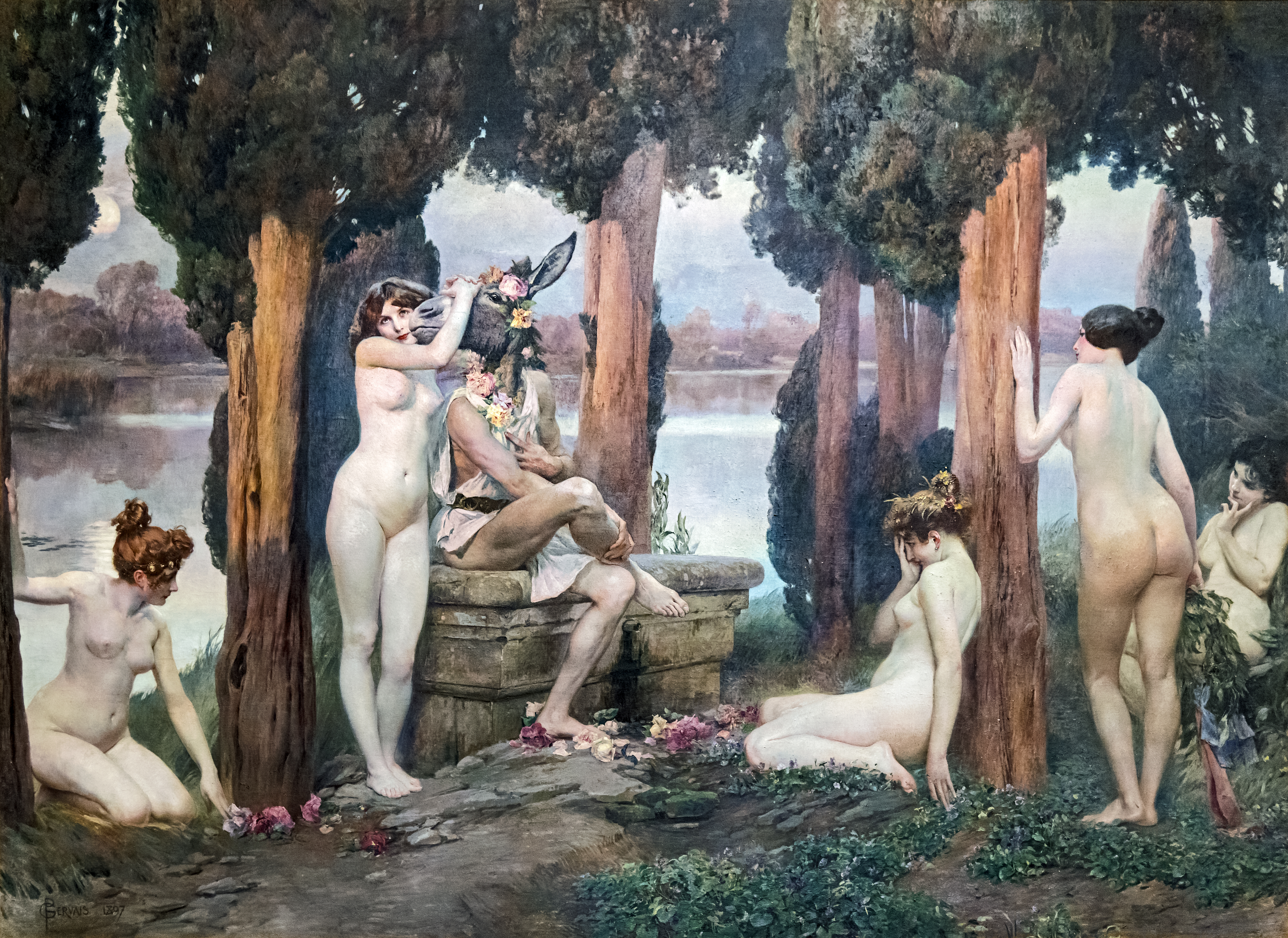
William Maginn thought Bottom a lucky man and was particularly amused that he treats Titania, the Queen of the Fairies, "as carelessly as if she were the wench of the next-door tapster".

In 1837, William Maginn produced essays on the play. He turned his attention to Theseus' speech about "the lunatic, the lover, and the poet" (Note: Theseus' "The lunatic, the lover, and the poet" speech is in A Midsummer Night's Dream V.I.2–22.) and to Hippolyta's response to it. He regarded Theseus as the voice of Shakespeare himself and the speech as a call for imaginative audiences. He also viewed Bottom as a lucky man on whom Fortune showered favours beyond measure. He was particularly amused by the way Bottom reacts to the love of the fairy queen: completely unfazed. Maginn argued that "Theseus would have bent in reverent awe before Titania. Bottom treats her as carelessly as if she were the wench of the next-door tapster." Finally, Maginn thought that Oberon should not be blamed for Titania's chagrin, which is the result of an accident. He viewed Oberon as angry with the "caprices" of his queen, but unable to anticipate that her charmed affections would be reserved for a weaver with a donkey's head.

In 1839, the philosopher Hermann Ulrici wrote that the play and its depiction of human life reflected the views of Platonism. In his view, Shakespeare implied that human life is nothing but a dream, suggesting influence from Plato and his followers who thought human reality is deprived of all genuine existence. Ulrici noted the way Theseus and Hippolyta behave here, like ordinary people. He agreed with Malone that this did not fit their stations in life, but viewed this behaviour as an indication of parody about class differences.

James Halliwell-Phillipps, writing in the 1840s, found that there were many inconsistencies in the play, but considered it the most beautiful poetical drama ever written.

In 1849, Charles Knight also wrote about the play and its apparent lack of proper social stratification. He thought that this play indicated Shakespeare's maturity as a playwright, and that its "Thesean harmony" reflects proper decorum of character. He also viewed Bottom as the best-drawn character, with his self-confidence, authority, and self-love. He argued that Bottom stands as a representative of the whole human race. Like Hazlitt he felt that the work is best appreciated when read as a text, rather than acted on stage. He found the writing to be "subtle and ethereal", and standing above literary criticism and its reductive reasoning.

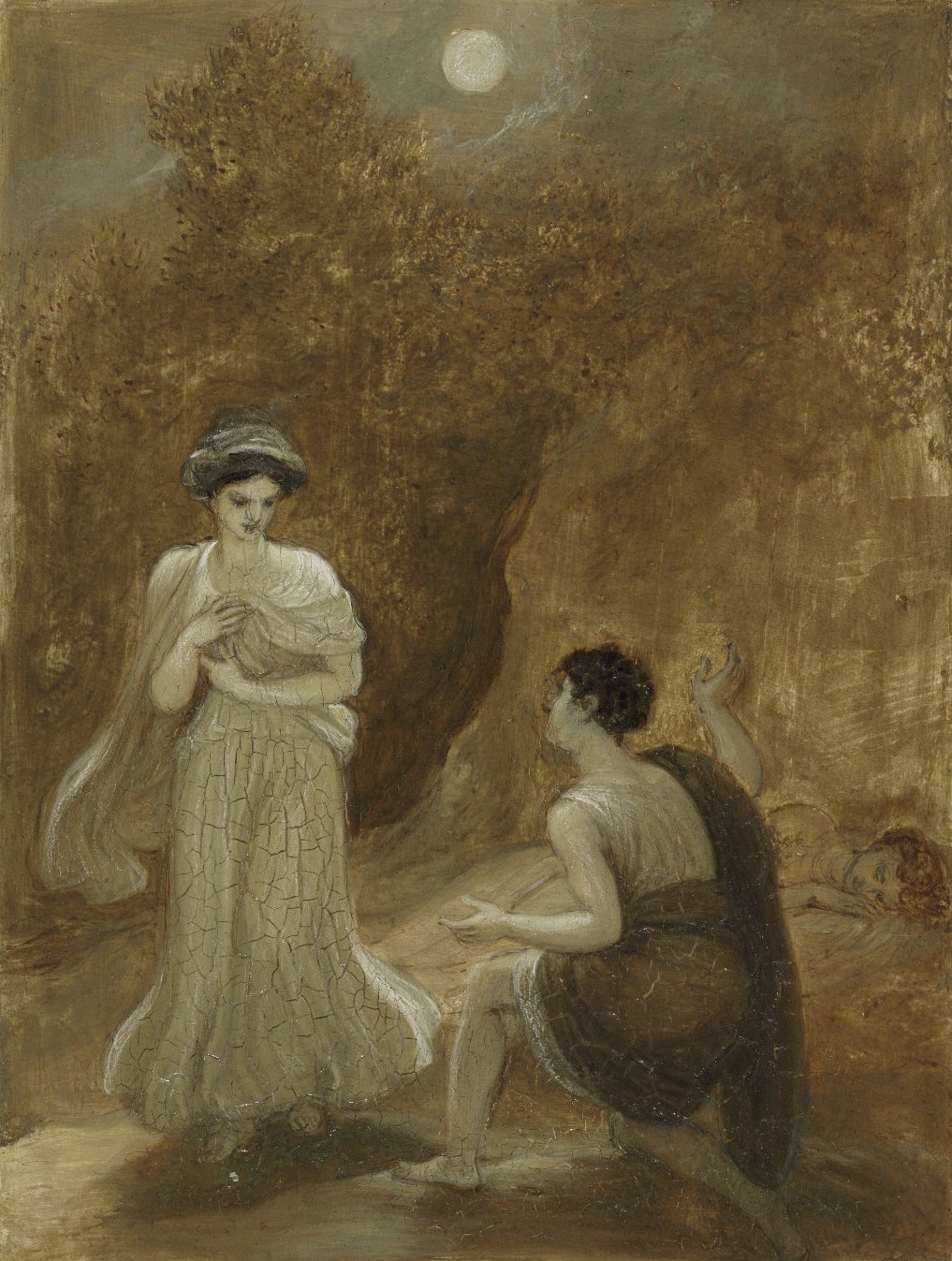
Georg Gottfried Gervinus thought Hermia lacking in filial piety and devoid of conscience for running away with Lysander, himself not a shining beacon of virtue (here seen wooing Helena).

Also in 1849, Georg Gottfried Gervinus wrote extensively about the play. He denied the theory that this play should be seen as a dream. He argued that it should be seen as an ethical construct and an allegory. He thought that it was an allegorical depiction of the errors of sensual love, which is likened to a dream. In his view, Hermia lacks in filial obedience and acts as if devoid of conscience when she runs away with Lysander. Lysander is also guilty for disobeying and mocking his prospective father-in-law. Pyramus and Thisbe also lack in filial obedience, since they "woo by moonlight" behind their parents' backs. The fairies, in his view, should be seen as "personified dream gods". They represent the caprices of superficial love, and they lack in intellect, feeling, and ethics.

Gervinus also wrote on where the fairyland of the play is located. Not in Attica, but in the Indies. His views on the Indies seem to Kehler to be influenced by Orientalism. He speaks of the Indies as scented with the aroma of flowers, and as the place where mortals live in the state of a half-dream. Gervinus denies and devalues the loyalty of Titania to her friend. He views this supposed friendship as not grounded in spiritual association. Titania merely "delight[s] in her beauty, her 'swimming gait,' and her powers of imitation". Gervinus further views Titania as an immoral character for not trying to reconcile with her husband. In her resentment, Titania seeks separation from him, for which Gervinus blames her.

Gervinus wrote with elitist disdain about the mechanicals of the play and their acting aspirations. He described them as homely creatures with "hard hands and thick heads". They are, in his view, ignorant men who compose and act in plays merely for financial reward. They are not real artists. Gervinus reserves his praise and respect only for Theseus, who he thinks represents the intellectual man. Like several of his predecessors, Gervinus thought that this work should be read as a text and not acted on stage.

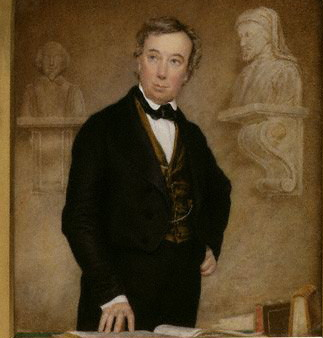
Charles Cowden Clarke appreciated the mechanicals, and in particular found Nick Bottom conceited but good-natured and imaginative.

In 1863, Charles Cowden Clarke also wrote on this play. Kehler notes he was the husband of famous Shakespearean scholar Mary Cowden Clarke. Charles was more appreciative of the lower-class mechanicals of the play. He commented favourably on their individualisation and their collective richness of character. He thought that Bottom was conceited but good natured, and shows a considerable store of imagination in his interaction with the representatives of the fairy world. He also argued that Bottom's conceit was a quality inseparable from his secondary profession, that of an actor.

In 1872, Henry N. Hudson, an American clergyman and editor of Shakespeare, also wrote comments on this play. Kehler pays little attention to his writings, as they were largely derivative of previous works. She notes, however, that Hudson too believed that the play should be viewed as a dream. He cited the lightness of the characterisation as supporting of his view. In 1881, Edward Dowden argued that Theseus and his reflections on art are central to the play. He also argued that Theseus was one of the "heroic men of action" so central to Shakespeare's theatrical works.

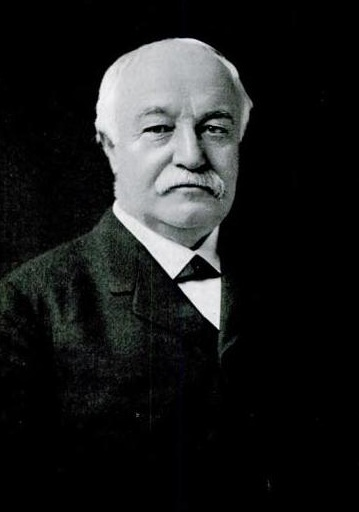
Horace Howard Furness defended A Midsummer Night's Dream from claims of inconsistency, and felt this did not detract from the quality of the play.

Both Horace Howard Furness and Henry Austin Clapp were more concerned with the problem of the play's duration, though they held opposing views. Clapp, writing in 1885, commented on the inconsistency of the time depicted in the play, as it should take place in four days and nights and seems to last less than two, and felt that this added to the unrealistic quality of the play. Furness, defending the play in 1895, felt that the apparent inconsistency did not detract from the play's quality.

In 1887, Denton Jacques Snider argued that the play should be read as a dialectic, either between understanding and imagination or between prose and poetry. He also viewed the play as representing three phases or movements. The first is the Real World of the play, which represents reason. The second is the Fairy World, an ideal world which represents imagination and the supernatural. The third is their representation in art, where the action is self-reflective. Snider viewed Titania and her caprice as solely to blame for her marital strife with Oberon. She therefore deserves punishment, and Oberon is a dutiful husband who provides her with one. For failing to live in peace with Oberon and her kind, Titania is sentenced to fall in love with a human. And this human, unlike Oberon is a "horrid brute".

Towards the end of the 19th century, Georg Brandes (1895–6) and Frederick S. Boas (1896) were the last major additions to A Midsummer Night's Dream criticism. Brandes' approach anticipates later psychological readings, seeing Oberon's magic as symbolic and "typifying the sorcery of the erotic imagination". Brandes felt that in the play, Shakespeare looks inward at the "domain of the unconscious". Boas eschews the play as ethical treatise or psychological study and instead takes a more historicist and literal approach. To Boas the play is, despite its fantastical and exotic trappings, "essentially English and Elizabethan". He sees Theseus as a Tudor noble; Helena a mere plot device to "concentrate the four lovers on a single spot"; and the Pyramus and Thisbe play-within-the-play a parody of a prominent topos of contemporary plays. Summing up their contributions, Kehler writes: "This is recognizably modern criticism."

==== 20th century ====
The 20th century brought new insights into the play. In 1961, Elizabeth Sewell argued that Shakespeare aligns himself not with the aristocrats of the play, but with Bottom and the artisans. It is their task to produce a wedding entertainment, precisely the purpose of the writer on working in this play. Also in 1961, Frank Kermode wrote on the themes of the play and their literary sources. He counted among them fantasy, blind love, and divine love. He traced these themes to the works of Macrobius, Apuleius, and Giordano Bruno. Bottom also briefly alludes to a passage from the First Epistle to the Corinthians by Paul the Apostle, dealing with divine love. (Note: Specifically, Bottom alludes to I Corinthians 2:9.)

In 1964, R.W. Dent argued against theories that the exemplary model of love in the play is the rational love of Theseus and Hippolyta. He argued that in this work, love is inexplicable. It is the offspring of imagination, not reason. However the exemplary love of the play is one of an imagination controlled and restrained, and avoids the excesses of "dotage". Genuine love is contrasted with the unrequited love (and dotage) of Demetrius for Hermia, and with the supposed love (and dotage) of Titania for an unworthy object.

Dent also denied the rationality and wisdom typically attributed to Theseus. He reminded his readers that this is the character of Theseus from Greek mythology, a creation himself of "antique fable". Theseus' views on art are far from rational or wise. He cannot tell the difference between an actual play and its interlude. The interlude of the play's acting troop is less about the art and more of an expression of the mechanicals' distrust of their own audience. They fear the audience reactions will be either excessive or inadequate, and say so on stage. Theseus fails to get the message.

Also in 1964, Jan Kott offered his own views on the play. He saw the main themes of the play as being violence and "unrepressed animalistic sexuality". Both Lysander and Demetrius are, in his view, verbally brutal lovers, whose love interests are exchangeable and objectified. The changeling that Oberon desires is his new "sexual toy". The aristocrats of the play, both mortal and immortal, are promiscuous. As for the Athenian lovers following their night in the forest, they are ashamed to talk about it because that night liberated them from themselves and social norms, and allowed them to reveal their real selves. Kott's views were controversial, and contemporary critics wrote either in favour of or against his ideas, but few ignored them.

In 1967, John A. Allen theorised that Bottom is a symbol of the animalistic aspect of humanity. He also thought Bottom was redeemed through the maternal tenderness of Titania, which allowed him to understand the love and self-sacrifice of Pyramus and Thisbe. In 1968, Stephen Fender offered his own views on the play. He emphasised the "terrifying power" of the fairies and argued that they control the play's events. They are the most powerful figures featured, not Theseus as often thought. He also emphasised the ethically ambivalent characters of the play. Finally, Fender noted a layer of complexity in the play. Theseus, Hippolyta, and Bottom have contradictory reactions to the events of the night, and each has partly valid reasons for their reactions, implying that the puzzles offered to the play's audience can have no singular answer or meaning.

In 1969, Michael Taylor argued that previous critics offered a too cheerful view of what the play depicts. He emphasised the less pleasant aspects of the otherwise appealing fairies and the nastiness of the mortal Demetrius prior to his enchantment. He argued that the overall themes are the often painful aspects of love and the pettiness of people, which here include the fairies.

In 1970, R. A. Zimbardo viewed the play as full of symbols. The Moon and its phases alluded to in the play, in his view, stand for permanence in mutability. The play uses the principle of discordia concors in several of its key scenes. Theseus and Hippolyta represent marriage and, symbolically, the reconciliation of the natural seasons or the phases of time. Hippolyta's story arc is that she must submit to Theseus and become a matron. Titania has to give up her motherly obsession with the changeling boy and passes through a symbolic death, and Oberon has to once again woo and win his wife. Kehler notes that Zimbardo took for granted the female subordination within the obligatory marriage, social views that were already challenged in the 1960s.

In 1971, James L. Calderwood offered a new view on the role of Oberon. He viewed the king as specialising in the arts of illusion. Oberon, in his view, is the interior dramatist of the play, orchestrating events. He is responsible for the play's happy ending, when he influences Theseus to overrule Egeus and allow the lovers to marry. Oberon and Theseus bring harmony out of discord. He also suggested that the lovers' identities, which are blurred and lost in the forest, recall the unstable identities of the actors who constantly change roles. In fact the failure of the artisans' play is based on their chief flaw as actors: they can not lose their own identities to even temporarily replace them with those of their fictional roles.

Also in 1971, Andrew D. Weiner argued that the play's actual theme is unity. The poet's imagination creates unity by giving form to diverse elements, and the writer is addressing the spectator's own imagination which also creates and perceives unity. Weiner connected this unity to the concept of uniformity, and in turn viewed this as Shakespeare's allusion to the "eternal truths" of Platonism and Christianity.

Also writing in 1971, Hugh M. Richmond offered an entirely new view of the play's love story lines. He argued that what passes for love in this play is actually a self-destructive expression of passion. He argued that the play's significant characters are all affected by passion and by a sadomasochistic type of sexuality. This passion prevents the lovers from genuinely communicating with each other. At the same time it protects them from the disenchantment with the love interest that communication inevitably brings. The exception to the rule is Bottom, who is chiefly devoted to himself. His own egotism protects him from feeling passion for anyone else. Richmond also noted that there are parallels between the tale of Pyramus and Thisbe, featured in this play, and that of Shakespeare's Romeo and Juliet.

In 1971, Neil Taylor argued that there was a double time-scheme in the play, making it seem to last a minimum of four nights but to also be timeless.

In 1972, Ralph Berry argued that Shakespeare was chiefly concerned with epistemology in this play. The lovers declare illusion to be reality, the actors declare reality to be illusion. The play ultimately reconciles the seemingly opposing views and vindicates imagination. Also in 1972, Thomas McFarland argued that the play is dominated by a mood of happiness and that it is one of the happiest literary creations ever produced. The mood is so lovely that the audience never feels fear or worry about the fate of the characters.

In 1974, Marjorie Garber argued that metamorphosis is both the major subject of the play and the model of its structure. She noted that in this play, the entry in the woods is a dream-like change in perception, a change which affects both the characters and the audience. Dreams here take priority over reason, and are truer than the reality they seek to interpret and transform. Also in 1974, Alexander Leggatt offered his own reading of the play. He was certain that there are grimmer elements in the play, but they are overlooked because the audience focuses on the story of the sympathetic young lovers. He viewed the characters as separated into four groups which interact in various ways. Among the four, the fairies stand as the most sophisticated and unconstrained. The contrasts between the interacting groups produce the play's comic perspective.

In 1975, Ronald F. Miller expresses his view that the play is a study in the epistemology of imagination. He focused on the role of the fairies, who have a mysterious aura of evanescence and ambiguity. Also in 1975, David Bevington offered his own reading of the play. He in part refuted the ideas of Jan Kott concerning the sexuality of Oberon and the fairies. He pointed that Oberon may be bisexual and his desire for the changeling boy may be sexual in nature, as Kott suggested. But there is little textual evidence to support this, as the writer left ambiguous clues concerning the idea of love among the fairies. He concluded that therefore their love life is "unknowable and incomprehensible". According to Bevington, the main theme of the play is the conflict between sexual desire and rational restraint, an essential tension reflected throughout the play. It is the tension between the dark and benevolent sides of love, which are reconciled in the end.

In 1977, Anne Paolucci argued that the play lasts five days.

In 1979, M. E. Lamb suggested that the play may have borrowed an aspect of the ancient myth of Theseus: the Athenian's entry into the Labyrinth of the Minotaur. The woods of the play serve as a metaphorical labyrinth, and for Elizabethans the woods were often an allegory of sexual sin. The lovers in the woods conquer irrational passion and find their way back. Bottom with his animal head becomes a comical version of the Minotaur. Bottom also becomes Ariadne's thread which guides the lovers. In having the new Minotaur rescue rather than threaten the lovers, the classical myth is comically inverted. Theseus himself is the bridegroom of the play who has left the labyrinth and promiscuity behind, having conquered his passion. The artisans may stand in for the master craftsman of the myth, and builder of the Labyrinth, Daedalus. Even Theseus' best known speech in the play, which connects the poet with the lunatic and the lover may be another metaphor of the lover. It is a challenge for the poet to confront the irrationality he shares with lovers and lunatics, accepting the risks of entering the labyrinth.

Also in 1979, Harold F. Brooks agreed that the main theme of the play, its very heart, is desire and its culmination in marriage. All other subjects are of lesser importance, including that of imagination and that of appearance and reality. In 1980, Florence Falk offered a view of the play based on theories of cultural anthropology. She argued that the play is about traditional rites of passage, which trigger development within the individual and society. Theseus has detached himself from imagination and rules Athens harshly. The lovers flee from the structure of his society to the communitas of the woods. The woods serve here as the communitas, a temporary aggregate for persons whose asocial desires require accommodation to preserve the health of society. This is the rite of passage where the asocial can be contained. Falk identified this communitas with the woods, with the unconscious, with the dream space. She argued that the lovers experience release into self-knowledge and then return to the renewed Athens. This is "societas", the resolution of the dialectic between the dualism of communitas and structure.

Also in 1980, Christian critic R. Chris Hassel, Jr. offered a Christian view of the play. The experience of the lovers and that of Bottom (as expressed in his awakening speech) teach them "a new humility, a healthy sense of folly". They realise that there are things that are true despite the fact that they can not be seen or understood. They just learned a lesson of faith. Hassel also thought that Theseus' speech on the lunatic, the lover, and the poet is an applause to imagination. But it is also a laughing rejection of futile attempts to perceive, categorise, or express it.

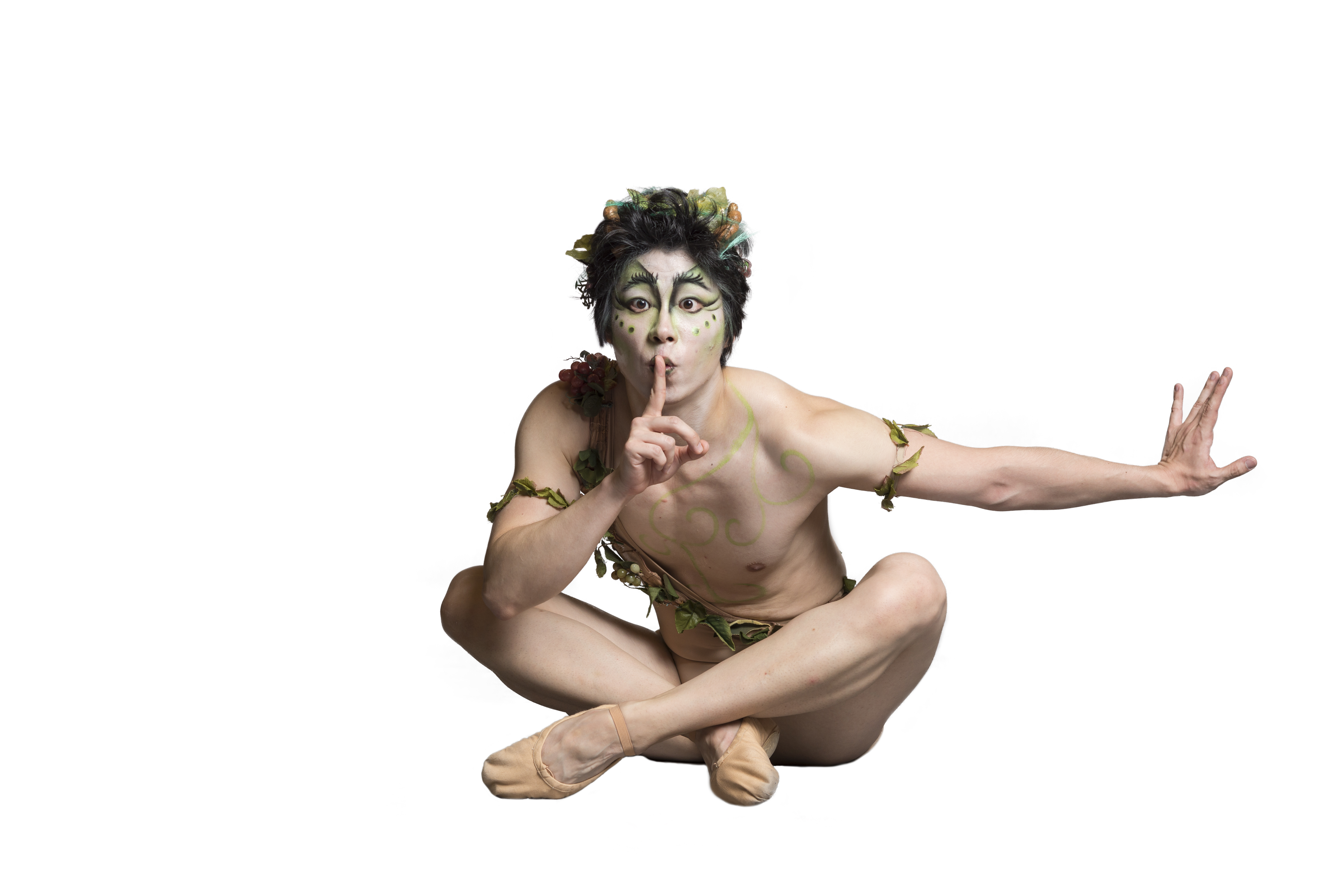
Alex Aronson considered Puck a representation of the unconscious mind and a contrast to Theseus as a representation of the conscious mind.

Some of the interpretations of the play have been based on psychology and its diverse theories. In 1972, Alex Aronson argued that Theseus represents the conscious mind and Puck represents the unconscious mind. Puck, in this view, is a guise of the unconscious as a trickster, while remaining subservient to Oberon. Aronson thought that the play explores unauthorised desire and linked it to the concept of fertility. He viewed the donkey and the trees as fertility symbols. The lovers' sexual desires are symbolised in their forest encounters. In 1973, Melvin Goldstein argued that the lovers can not simply return to Athens and wed. First, they have to pass through stages of madness (multiple disguises), and discover their "authentic sexual selves". In 1979, Norman N. Holland applied psychoanalytic literary criticism to the play. He interpreted the dream of Hermia as if it was a real dream. In his view, the dream uncovers the phases of Hermia's sexual development. Her search for options is her defence mechanism. She both desires Lysander and wants to retain her virginity.

In 1981, Mordecai Marcus argued for a new meaning of Eros (Love) and Thanatos (Death) in this play. In his view, Shakespeare suggests that love requires the risk of death. Love achieves force and direction from the interweaving of the life impulse with the deathward-release of sexual tension. He also viewed the play as suggesting that the healing force of love is connected to the acceptance of death, and vice versa.

In 1987, Jan Lawson Hinely argued that this play has a therapeutic value. Shakespeare in many ways explores the sexual fears of the characters, releases them, and transforms them. And the happy ending is the reestablishment of social harmony. Patriarchy itself is also challenged and transformed, as the men offer their women a loving equality, one founded on respect and trust. She even viewed Titania's loving acceptance of the donkey-headed Bottom as a metaphor for basic trust. This trust is what enables the warring and uncertain lovers to achieve their sexual maturity. In 1988, Allen Dunn argued that the play is an exploration of the characters' fears and desires, and that its structure is based on a series of sexual clashes.

In 1991, Barbara Freedman argued that the play justifies the ideological formation of absolute monarchy, and makes visible for examination the maintenance process of hegemonic order.

== Performance history ==
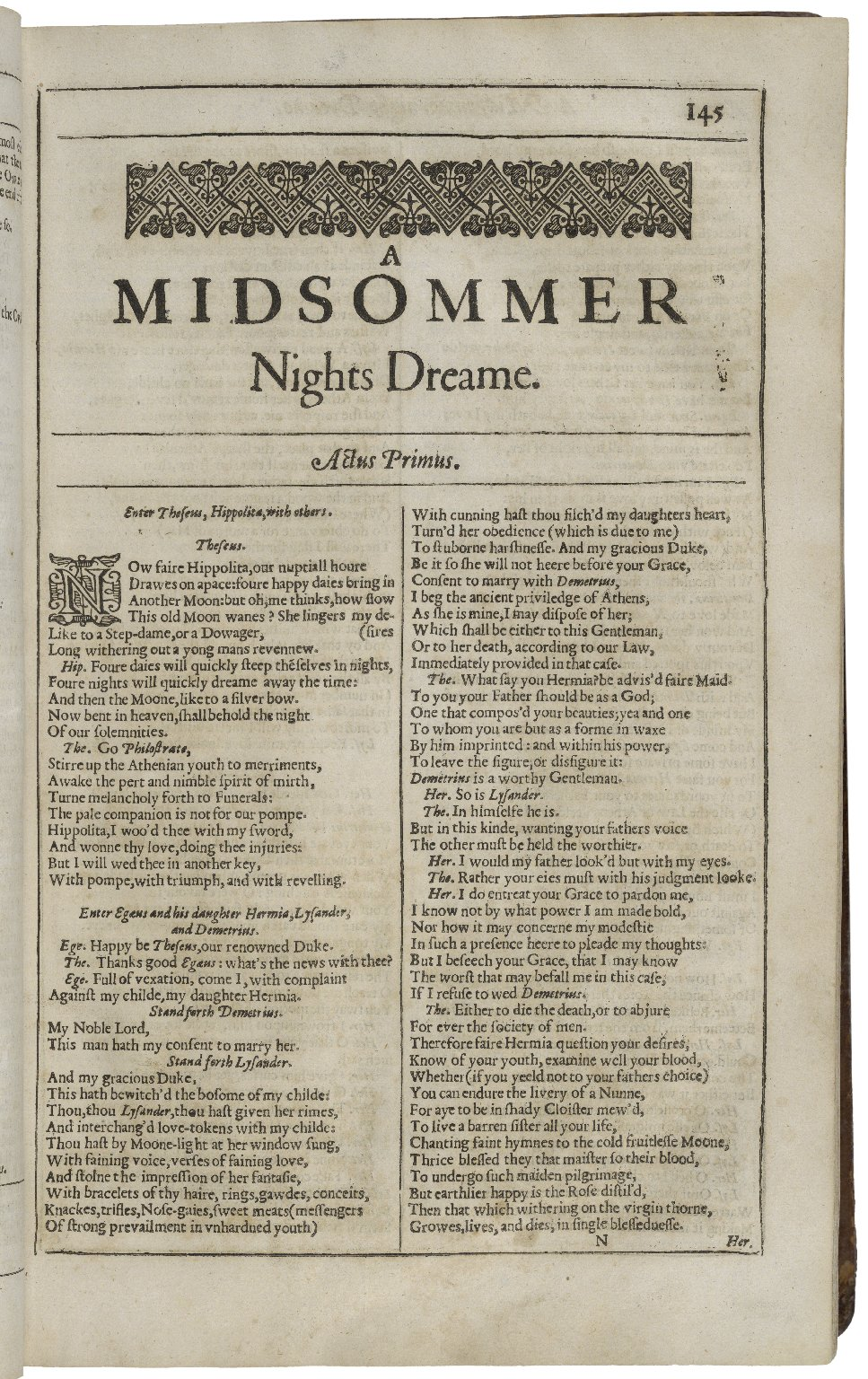
The first page printed in the Second Folio of 1632

=== 17th and 18th centuries ===
During the years of the Puritan Interregnum when the theatres were closed (1642–1660), the comic subplot of Bottom and his compatriots was performed as a droll. Drolls were comical playlets, often adapted from the subplots of Shakespearean and other plays, that could be attached to the acts of acrobats and jugglers and other allowed performances, thus circumventing the ban against drama. When the theatres re-opened in 1660, A Midsummer Night's Dream was acted in adapted form, like many other Shakespearean plays. Samuel Pepys saw it on 29 September 1662 and thought it "the most insipid, ridiculous play that ever I saw ..."

After the Jacobean / Caroline era, A Midsummer Night's Dream was never performed in its entirety until the 1840s. Instead, it was heavily adapted in forms like Henry Purcell's musical masque/play The Fairy Queen (1692), which had a successful run at the Dorset Garden Theatre, but was not revived. Richard Leveridge turned the Pyramus and Thisbe scenes into an Italian opera burlesque, acted at Lincoln's Inn Fields in 1716. John Frederick Lampe elaborated upon Leveridge's version in 1745. Charles Johnson had used the Pyramus and Thisbe material in the finale of Love in a Forest, his 1723 adaptation of As You Like It. In 1755, David Garrick did the opposite of what had been done a century earlier: he extracted Bottom and his companions and acted the rest, in an adaptation called The Fairies. Frederic Reynolds produced an operatic version in 1816.

=== The Victorian stage ===
In 1840, Madame Vestris at Covent Garden returned the play to the stage with a relatively full text, adding musical sequences and balletic dances. Vestris took the role of Oberon, and for the next seventy years, Oberon and Puck would always be played by women.

After the success of Madame Vestris' production, 19th-century theatre continued to stage the Dream as a spectacle, often with a cast numbering nearly one hundred. Detailed sets were created for the palace and the forest, and the fairies were portrayed as gossamer-winged ballerinas. The overture by Felix Mendelssohn was always used throughout this period. Augustin Daly's production opened in 1895 in London and ran for 21 performances.

=== 20th and 21st centuries ===
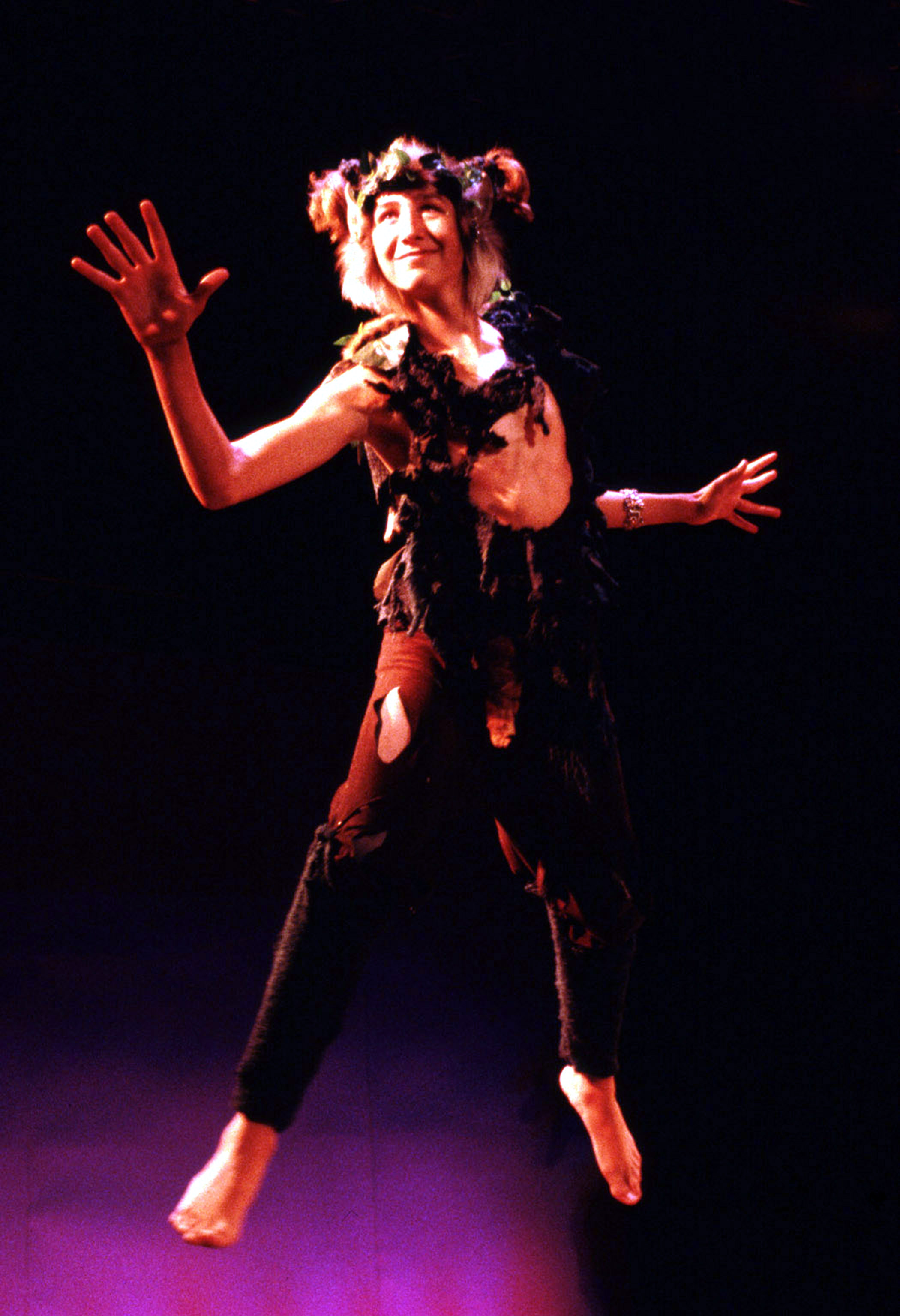
Vince Cardinale as Puck from the Carmel Shakespeare Festival production of A Midsummer Night's Dream, September 2000

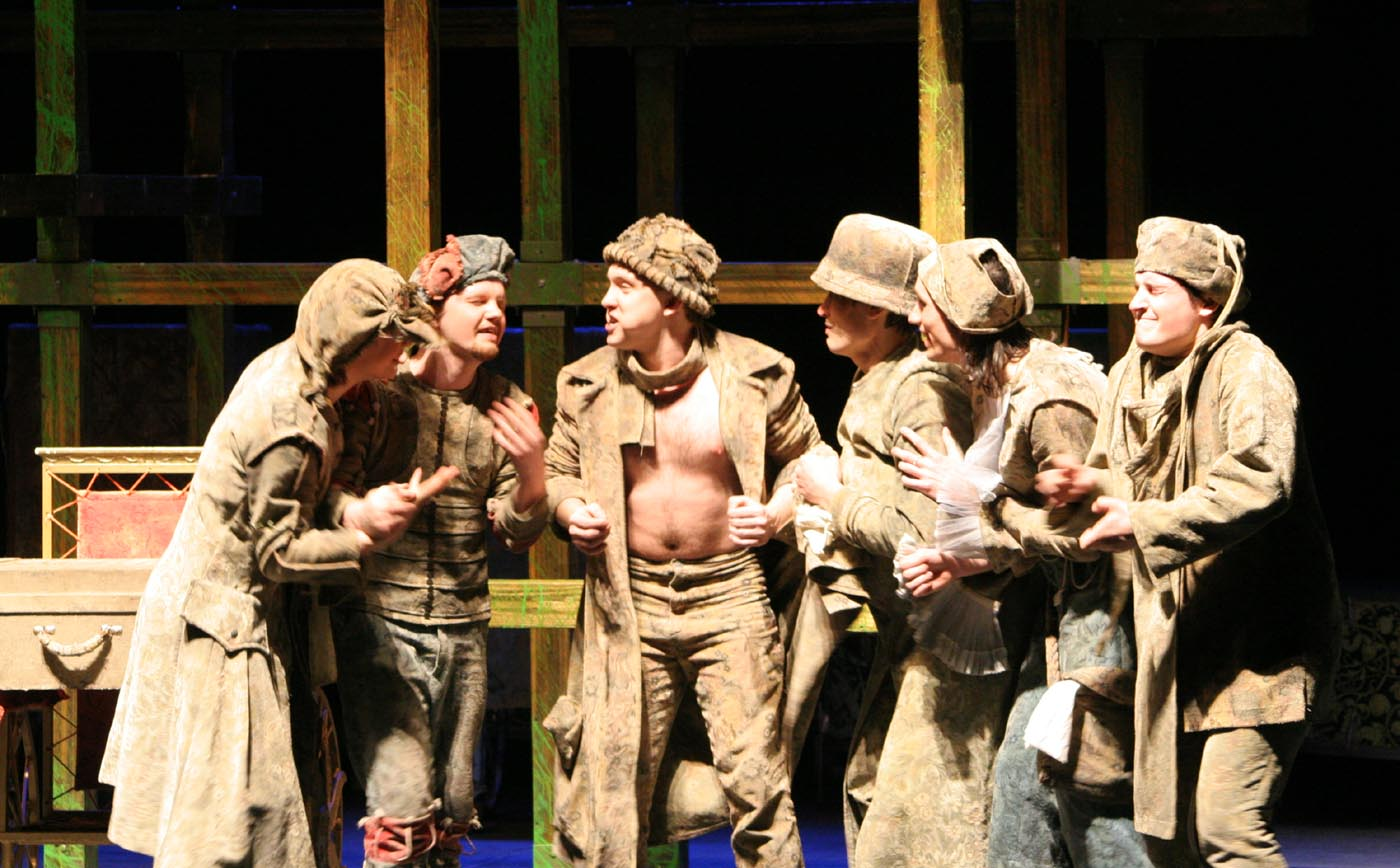
Performance by Saratov Puppet Theatre "Teremok" A Midsummer Night's Dream based on the play by William Shakespeare (2007)

In 1905 Oscar Asche staged a production at the Adelphi Theatre in London with himself as Bottom and Beatrice Ferrar as Puck. Herbert Beerbohm Tree staged a 1911 production which featured "mechanical birds twittering in beech trees, a simulated stream, fairies wearing battery-operated lighting, and live rabbits following trails of food across the stage."

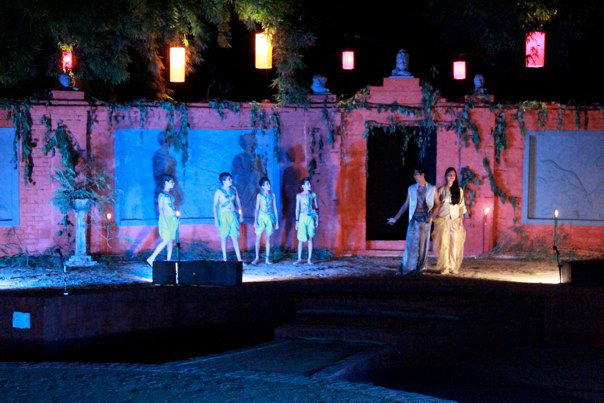
A 2010 production of the play at The Doon School, India

Max Reinhardt staged A Midsummer Night's Dream thirteen times between 1905 and 1934, introducing a revolving set. After he fled Germany he devised a more spectacular outdoor version at the Hollywood Bowl in September 1934. The shell was removed and replaced by a forest planted in tons of dirt hauled in especially for the event, and a trestle was constructed from the hills to the stage. The wedding procession inserted between Acts IV and V crossed the trestle with torches down the hillside. The cast included James Cagney, Olivia de Havilland, Mickey Rooney, Victor Jory, and a corps of dancers that included Butterfly McQueen. The play was accompanied by Mendelssohn's music.

On the strength of this production, Warner Brothers signed Reinhardt to direct a filmed version, Hollywood's first Shakespeare movie since Douglas Fairbanks Sr. and Mary Pickford's Taming of the Shrew in 1929. Jory (Oberon), Rooney (Puck) and De Havilland (Hermia) reprised their roles from the Hollywood Bowl cast. James Cagney starred, in his only Shakespearean role, as Bottom. Other actors in the film who played Shakespearean roles just this once included Joe E. Brown and Dick Powell. Erich Wolfgang Korngold was brought from Austria to arrange Mendelssohn's music for the film. He used not only the Midsummer Night's Dream music but also several other pieces by Mendelssohn. Korngold went on to make a legendary career in Hollywood, remaining in the United States after Nazi Germany annexed Austria.

Director Harley Granville-Barker introduced in 1914 a less spectacular way of staging the Dream: he reduced the size of the cast and used Elizabethan folk music instead of Mendelssohn. He replaced large, complex sets with a simple system of patterned curtains. He portrayed the fairies as golden robotic insectoid creatures based on Cambodian idols.

In 1970, Peter Brook staged the play for the Royal Shakespeare Company in a blank white box, in which masculine fairies engaged in circus tricks such as trapeze artistry. Brook also introduced the subsequently common notion of doubling Theseus/Oberon and Hippolyta/Titania, as if to suggest that the world of the fairies is a mirror version of the world of the mortals. British actors who played roles in Brook's production included Patrick Stewart, Ben Kingsley, John Kane (Puck) and Frances de la Tour (Helena). Recordings documenting this production survive.

A Midsummer Night's Dream has been produced many times in New York, including a production by the Theatre for a New Audience, produced by Joseph Papp at the Public Theater, and also several stagings by the New York Shakespeare Festival at the Delacorte Theatre in Central Park. In 1978, the Riverside Shakespeare Company staged an outdoor production starring Eric Hoffmann as Puck, with Karen Hurley as Titania and Eric Conger as Oberon, directed by company founder Gloria Skurski. There have been several variations since then, including some set in the 1980s.

In 1995 the National Asian American Theater Company staged the play with an all Asian American cast. The Maryland Shakespeare Players at University of Maryland staged a queer production in 2015 in which the lovers were same-sex couples and the mechanicals were drag queens.

The University of Michigan's Nichols Arboretum's programme Shakespeare in the Arb has presented a play every summer since 2001. Shakespeare in the Arb has produced A Midsummer Night's Dream three times. These performances take place in a 123-acre (50 ha) natural setting, with lush woods, a flowing river, and steep hills. The performance takes place in several places, with actors and audience moving together to each setting. "As one critic commented, 'The actors used the vastness of its Arb[oretum] stage to full advantage, making entrances from behind trees, appearing over rises and vanishing into the woods.'"

Artistic director Emma Rice's first production at Shakespeare's Globe in 2016 was a version of the play. While not "a production to please the purists", it received praise. A contemporary reworking, it included gender-switched characters and Bollywood influences.

== Adaptations and cultural references ==
=== Plays ===
Absurda Comica, oder Herr Peter Squentz by Andreas Gryphius, which was probably written between 1648 and 1650 and was published in 1657, is evidently based on the comic episode of Pyramus and Thisbe in A Midsummer Night's Dream.

Ken Ludwig's 2003 comic play, Shakespeare in Hollywood, is set during the production of the 1935 film. Oberon and Puck appear on the scene, and find themselves cast as themselves.

=== Literary ===
Karl Marx quotes from the play in the first volume of his magnum opus Das Kapital.

The play was translated into Esperanto (constructed international auxiliary language) by Louise Briggs in 1920.

W. Stanley Moss used the quotation "Ill met by moonlight" as the title of his Ill Met by Moonlight (1950), a non-fiction book about the kidnap of General Kreipe during WWII. The book was adapted into a film with the same name in 1957.

Botho Strauß's play The Park (1983) is based on characters and motifs from A Midsummer Night's Dream.

Neil Gaiman's comic series The Sandman uses the play in the 1990 issue "A Midsummer Night's Dream". In this story, Shakespeare and his company perform the play for the real Oberon and Titania and an audience of fairies. The play is heavily quoted in the comic, and Shakespeare's son Hamnet appears in the play as the Indian boy. This issue was the first and only comic to win the World Fantasy Award for Best Short Fiction, in 1991.

Terry Pratchett's book Lords and Ladies (1992) is a parody of the play.

Bernard Cornwell's novel Fools and Mortals (2017) is about the creation and first performance of the play, as seen by the young actor, Richard Shakespeare, brother of the playwright.

=== Musical versions ===
The Fairy-Queen is an opera from 1692 by Henry Purcell, based on the play.

In 1826, Felix Mendelssohn composed a concert overture, inspired by the play, that was first performed in 1827. In 1842, partly because of the fame of the overture, and partly because his employer King Friedrich Wilhelm IV of Prussia liked the incidental music that Mendelssohn had written for other plays that had been staged at the palace in German translation, Mendelssohn was commissioned to write incidental music for a production of A Midsummer Night's Dream that was to be staged in 1843 in Potsdam. He incorporated the existing Overture into the incidental music, which was used in most stage versions through the 19th century. The best known of the pieces from the incidental music is the famous Wedding March, frequently used as a recessional in weddings.

Between 1917 and 1939 Carl Orff also wrote incidental music for a German version of the play, Ein Sommernachtstraum (performed in 1939). Given that Mendelssohn's parents had been Jews (and despite the fact that they converted to Lutheranism), his music had been banned by the Nazi regime, and the Nazi cultural officials put out a call for new music for the play: Orff was one of the musicians who responded. He later reworked the music for a final version, completed in 1964.

In 1949, a three-act opera by Marcel Delannoy entitled Puck was premiered in Strasbourg.

"Over Hill, Over Dale", from Act 2, is the third of the Three Shakespeare Songs set to music by the British composer Ralph Vaughan Williams. He wrote the pieces for a cappella SATB choir in 1951 for the British Federation of Music Festivals, and they remain a popular part of British choral repertoire today.

The play was adapted into an opera, with music by Benjamin Britten and libretto by Britten and Peter Pears. This was first performed on 11 June 1960 at Aldeburgh.

In 1964, a musical adaptation debuted on Broadway as Babes in The Wood.

Progressive rock guitarist Steve Hackett, best known for his work with Genesis, made a classical adaptation of the play in 1997. Hans Werner Henze's Eighth Symphony, written in 1993, is also inspired by sequences from the play.

The theatre company Moonwork put on a production of Midsummer in 1999. It was conceived by Mason Pettit, Gregory Sherman and Gregory Wolfe (who directed it). The show featured a rock-opera version of the play within a play, Pyramus & Thisbe, with music written by Rusty Magee. The music for the rest of the show was written by Andrew Sherman.

The Donkey Show is a disco-era experience based on A Midsummer Night's Dream, that first appeared off Broadway in 1999.

In 2011, Opera Memphis, Playhouse on the Square, and contemporary a cappella groups DeltaCappella and Riva, premiered Michael Ching's A Midsummer Night's Dream: Opera A Cappella.

In 2015, the plot of Be More Chill included a version of the play called A Midsummer Nightmare (About Zombies).

=== Ballets ===
- Marius Petipa made a ballet adaptation for the Imperial Ballet of St. Petersburg with additional music and adaptations to Mendelssohn's score by Léon Minkus. The revival premiered 14 July 1876.
- George Balanchine's A Midsummer Night's Dream, his first original full-length ballet, was premiered by the New York City Ballet on 17 January 1962. It was chosen to open the NYCB's first season at the New York State Theater at Lincoln Center in 1964. Balanchine interpolated further music by Mendelssohn into his Dream, including the overture from Athalie. A film version of the ballet was released in 1966.
- Frederick Ashton created The Dream, a short (not full-length) ballet set exclusively to the famous music by Félix Mendelssohn, arranged by John Lanchbery, in 1964. It was created on England's Royal Ballet and has since entered the repertoire of other companies, notably The Joffrey Ballet and American Ballet Theatre.
- John Neumeier created his full-length ballet Ein Sommernachtstraum for his company at the Hamburg State Opera (Hamburgische Staatsoper) in 1977. Longer than Ashton's or Balanchine's earlier versions, Neumeier's version includes other music by Mendelssohn along with the Midsummer Night's Dream music, as well as music from the modern composer György Ligeti, and jaunty barrel organ music. Neumeier devotes the three sharply differing musical styles to the three character groups, with the aristocrats and nobles dancing to Mendelssohn, the fairies to Ligeti, and the rustics or mechanicals to the barrel organ.
- Elvis Costello composed the music for a full-length ballet Il Sogno, based on A Midsummer Night's Dream. The music was subsequently released as a classical album by Deutsche Grammophon in 2004.

=== Film adaptations ===
A Midsummer Night's Dream has been adapted as a film many times. The following are the best known.

- A 1925 German silent film Wood Love directed by Hans Neumann.
- A 1935 film version was directed by Max Reinhardt and William Dieterle. The cast included James Cagney as Bottom, Mickey Rooney as Puck, Olivia de Havilland as Hermia, Joe E. Brown as Francis Flute, Dick Powell as Lysander, Anita Louise as Titania and Victor Jory as Oberon.
- A 1947 TV film version was directed by I. Orr-Ewing. The cast included Iris Baker as Helena, Peter Bell as Demetrius, Vivienne Bennett as Titania, John Byron as Oberon, Andrew Faulds as Lysander, Patricia Hicks as Hermia, Mary Honer as Puck, Desmond Llewelyn as Theseus, Hugh Manning as Bottem, Peter Sallis as Quince, Angela Shafto as Hippolyta.
- Sen noci svatojánské (1959) directed by Czech animator Jiří Trnka is a stop-motion puppet film that follows Shakespeare's story simply with a narrator. The English-language version was narrated by Richard Burton.
- A 1968 film version was directed by Peter Hall. The cast included Paul Rogers as Bottom, Ian Holm as Puck, Diana Rigg as Helena, Helen Mirren as Hermia, Ian Richardson as Oberon, Judi Dench as Titania, and Sebastian Shaw as Quince. This film stars the Royal Shakespeare Company, and is directed by Peter Hall.
- A 1969 film version was directed by Jean-Christophe Averty. The cast included Jean-Claude Drouot as Oberon, Claude Jade as Helena, Christine Delaroche as Hermia, Marie Versini as Hippolyta, Michel Modo as Flute, Guy Grosso as Quinze.
- A Midsummer Night's Sex Comedy (1982) was written and directed by Woody Allen. The plot is loosely based on Ingmar Bergman's Smiles of a Summer Night, with some elements from Shakespeare's play.
- Bottom's Dream (1983) was an animated short directed by John Canemaker, showing events of the play from the point of view of Bottom. The film uses selections of Mendelssohn's music, lines from the play, and surreal imagery to convey Bottom's experience.
- Dead Poets Society features the play as a production for which Neil Perry tries out and wins the role of Puck, in spite of his father's disapproval of his acting aspirations.
- A 1996 adaptation directed by Adrian Noble. The cast included Desmond Barrit as Bottom, Finbar Lynch as Puck, Alex Jennings as Oberon/Theseus, and Lindsay Duncan as Titania/Hippolyta. This film is based on Noble's Royal Shakespeare Company production. Its art design is eccentric, featuring a forest of floating light bulbs and a giant umbrella for Titania's bower.
- A 1996 French film, The Apartment (L'Appartement), directed by Gilles Mimouni, has many references to the play.
- A 1999 film version was written and directed by Michael Hoffman. The cast includes Kevin Kline as Bottom, Rupert Everett as Oberon, Michelle Pfeiffer as Titania, Stanley Tucci as Puck, Sophie Marceau as Hippolyta, Christian Bale as Demetrius, Dominic West as Lysander, Anna Friel as Hermia and Calista Flockhart as Helena. This adaptation relocates the play's action from Athens to a fictional "Monte Athena", located in Tuscany, Italy, although all textual mentions of Athens are retained.
- A 1999 version was written and directed by James Kerwin. The cast included Travis Schuldt as Demetrius. It set the story against a surreal backdrop of techno clubs and ancient symbols.
- Get Over It is a 2001 teen comedy directed by Tommy O'Haver and starring Kirsten Dunst, Ben Foster, Shane West, Martin Short, Colin Hanks, Mila Kunis, and Sisqo. In the film, students prepare for a high school production of A Midsummer Night's Dream as their own lives echo the play's plot.
- The Children's Midsummer Night's Dream (2002), directed by Christine Edzard, was produced by Sands Films at their studio in Rotherhithe, London, using 350 school children from Southwark, between the ages of eight and eleven, all theatrically untrained. The sets and costumes were designed to scale and made on site.
- A Midsummer Night's Rave (2002) directed by Gil Cates Jr. changes the setting to a modern rave. Puck is a drug dealer, the magic flower called love-in-idleness is replaced with magic ecstasy, and the King and Queen of Fairies are the host of the rave and the DJ.
- Were the World Mine (2008) features a modern interpretation of the play put on in a private high school in a small town, where the play's love potion is created and used to help LGBTQ+ students fall in love.
- 10ml Love (2012) by Sharat Katariya reimagines the play in modern-day India.
- A 2018 American independent film relocates the story to modern-day Los Angeles.
- A 2019 UK film version shot in Austria is set in an alternative near future. Directed by Sacha Bennett, it features Robert Lindsay as Oberon, Juliet Aubrey as Titania, Lee Boardman as Bottom, Harry Jarvis as Lysander, Tamzin Merchant as Helena, Holly Earl as Hermia, Tyger Drew-Honey as Demetrius and Florence Kasumba as Hippolyta.

=== TV productions ===
- The "play within a play" from Act V, Scene I, Pyramus and Thisbe, was performed by members of The Beatles on 28 April 1964 for a British television special, Around The Beatles. Paul McCartney appeared as Pyramus, John Lennon as Thisbe, George Harrison as Moonshine, and Ringo Starr as Lion. The performance, before a live audience, was done with great comic intent and included a number of intentional hecklers. This was broadcast in the UK on ITV on 6 May, and in the US on ABC on 15 November.
- The 1981 BBC Television Shakespeare production was produced by Jonathan Miller and directed by Elijah Moshinsky. It starred Helen Mirren as Titania, Peter McEnery as Oberon, Phil Daniels as Puck, Robert Lindsay as Lysander, Geoffrey Palmer as Quince and Brian Glover as Bottom.
- An abbreviated version of A Midsummer Night's Dream was made into an animated short (with the same title) by Walt Disney Television Animation in 1999 as part of the Mickey Mouse Works series. It was featured in a 2002 episode of House of Mouse ("House of Scrooge", Season 3, Episode 34). The star-crossed lovers are played by Mickey Mouse (Lysander), Minnie Mouse (Hermia), Donald Duck (Demetrius), and Daisy Duck (Helena). The character based on Theseus is played by Ludwig Von Drake, and the character based on Egeus by Scrooge McDuck. Goofy appears as an accident-prone Puck. The story ends with the revelation that it was a dream experienced by Mickey Mouse while sleeping at a picnic hosted by Minnie.
- In 2005 ShakespeaRe-Told, the BBC TV series, aired an updated of the play. It was written by Peter Bowker. The cast includes Johnny Vegas as Bottom, Dean Lennox Kelly as Puck, Bill Paterson as Theo (a conflation of Theseus and Egeus), and Imelda Staunton as his wife Polly (Hippolyta). Lennie James plays Oberon and Sharon Small is Titania. Zoe Tapper and Michelle Bonnard play Hermia and Helena.
- In 2006, The Suite Life of Zack & Cody released an episode called "A Midsummer's Nightmare" where the children are preparing to perform Shakespeare's popular work for a school play. This episode was #22 in season two of the show.
- BBC One's 2016 production was a 90-minute TV film adaptation by Russell T Davies directed by David Kerr starring Matt Lucas as Bottom, Maxine Peake as Titania, and with a diverse cast including Nonso Anozie as Oberon, Prisca Bakare as Hermia and Hiran Abeysekera as Puck.

=== Role-playing games ===
Two of the archfeys in The Forgotten Realms adventure setting for Dungeons and Dragons are called Oberon and Titania.

=== Video games ===
A 2026 strategy video game Titanium Court takes place in a faerie court. The court's steward is named Puck. More references become apparent as the game progresses.

=== Astronomy ===
In 1787, British astronomer William Herschel discovered two new moons of Uranus. In 1852 his son John Herschel named them after characters in the play: Oberon, and Titania. Another Uranian moon, discovered in 1985 by the Voyager 2 spacecraft, has been named Puck.

== Gallery ==
A Midsummer Night's Dream in Art

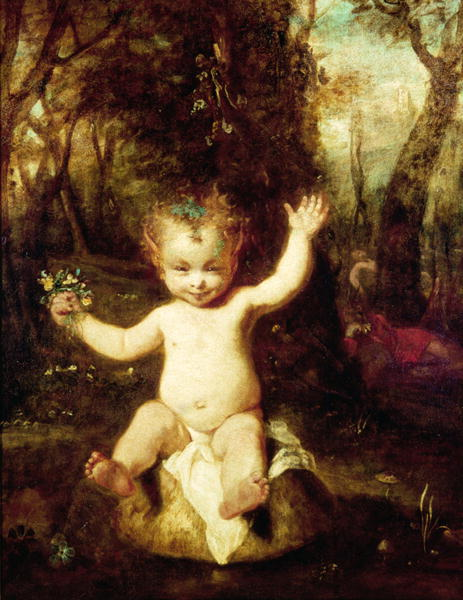
Puck by Joshua Reynolds, 1789

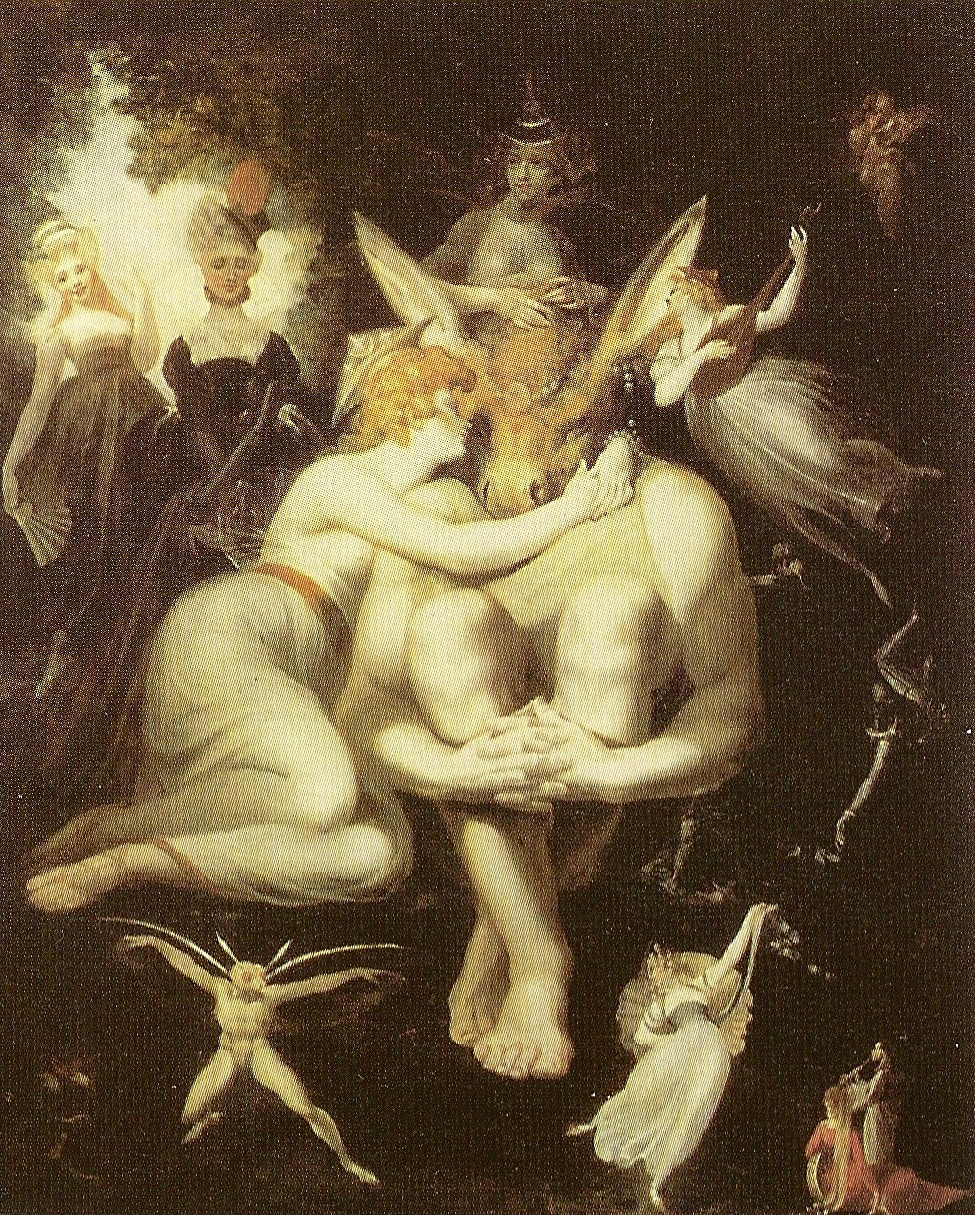
Titania and Bottom by Johann Heinrich Füssli 1793–94

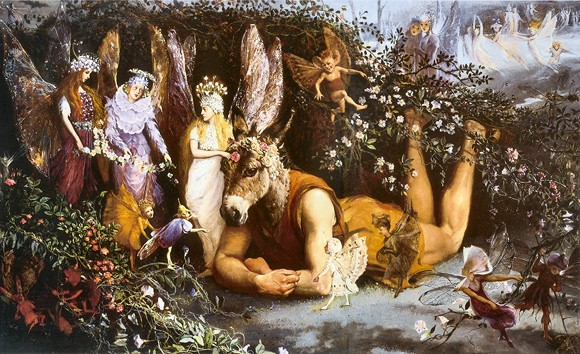
Titania and Bottom by John Anster Fitzgerald

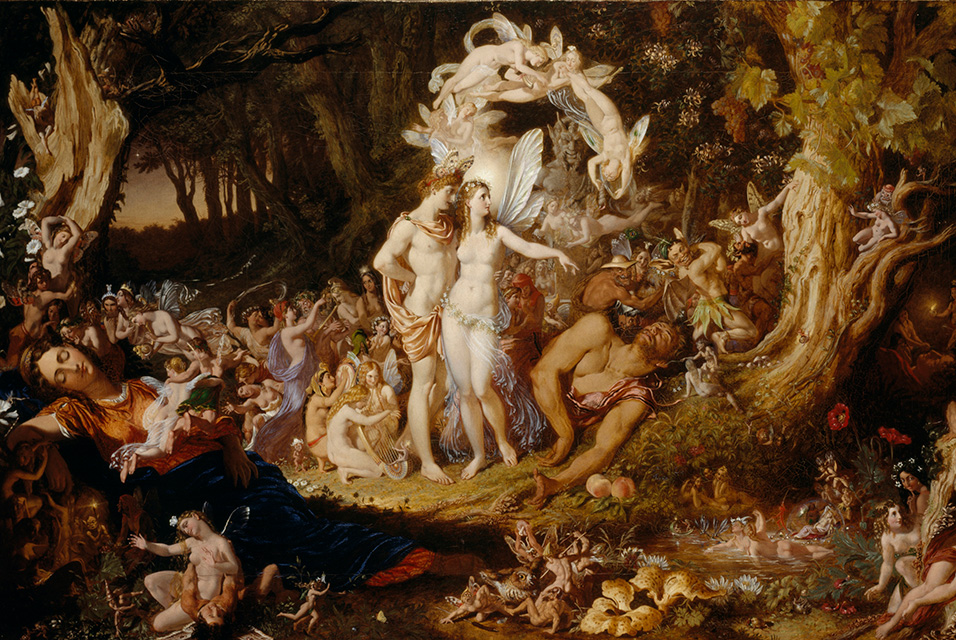
Joseph Noel Paton: The Reconciliation of Titania and Oberon

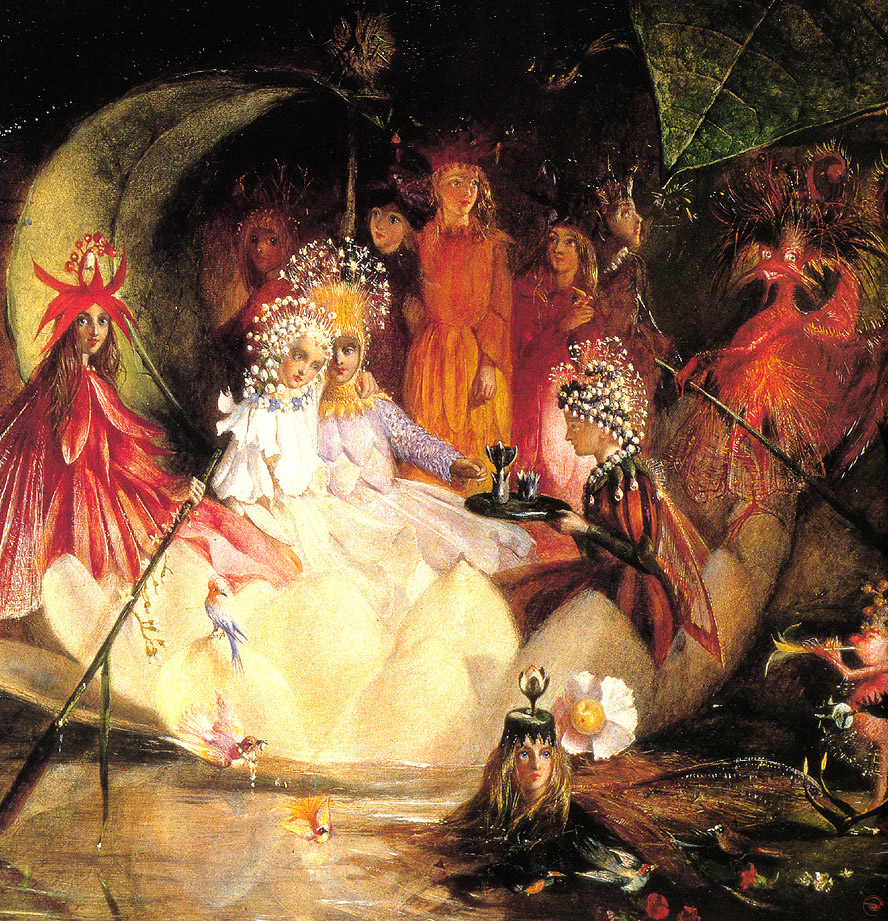
The Marriage of Oberon and Titania by John Anster Fitzgerald

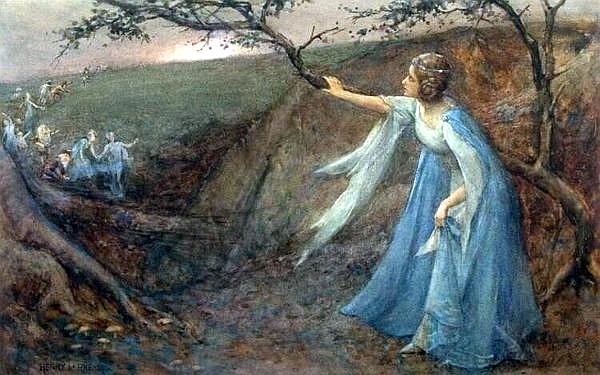
Henry Meynell Rheam: Titania welcoming her fairy brethren

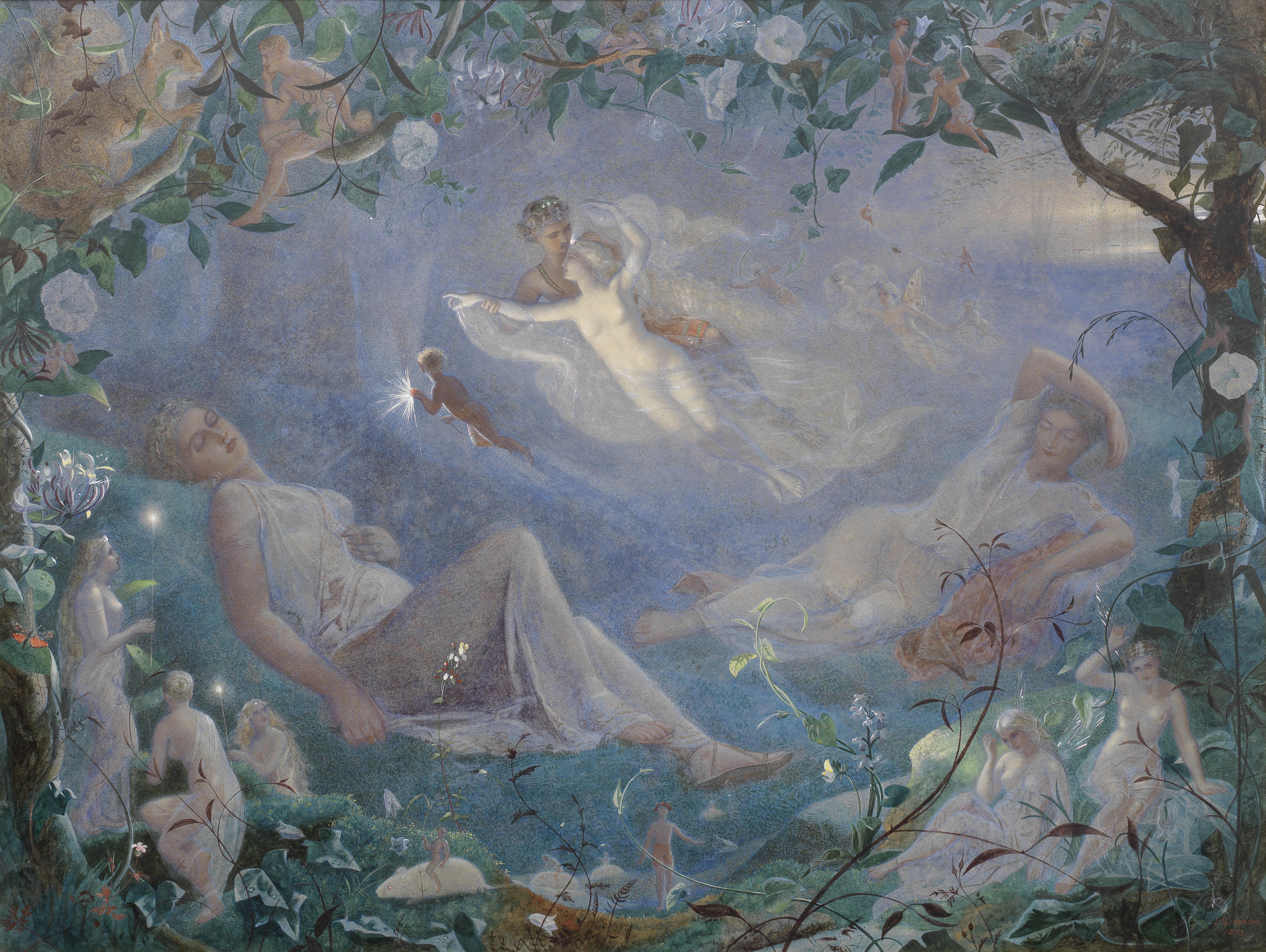
A Midsummer Night's Dream by John Simmons, 1873

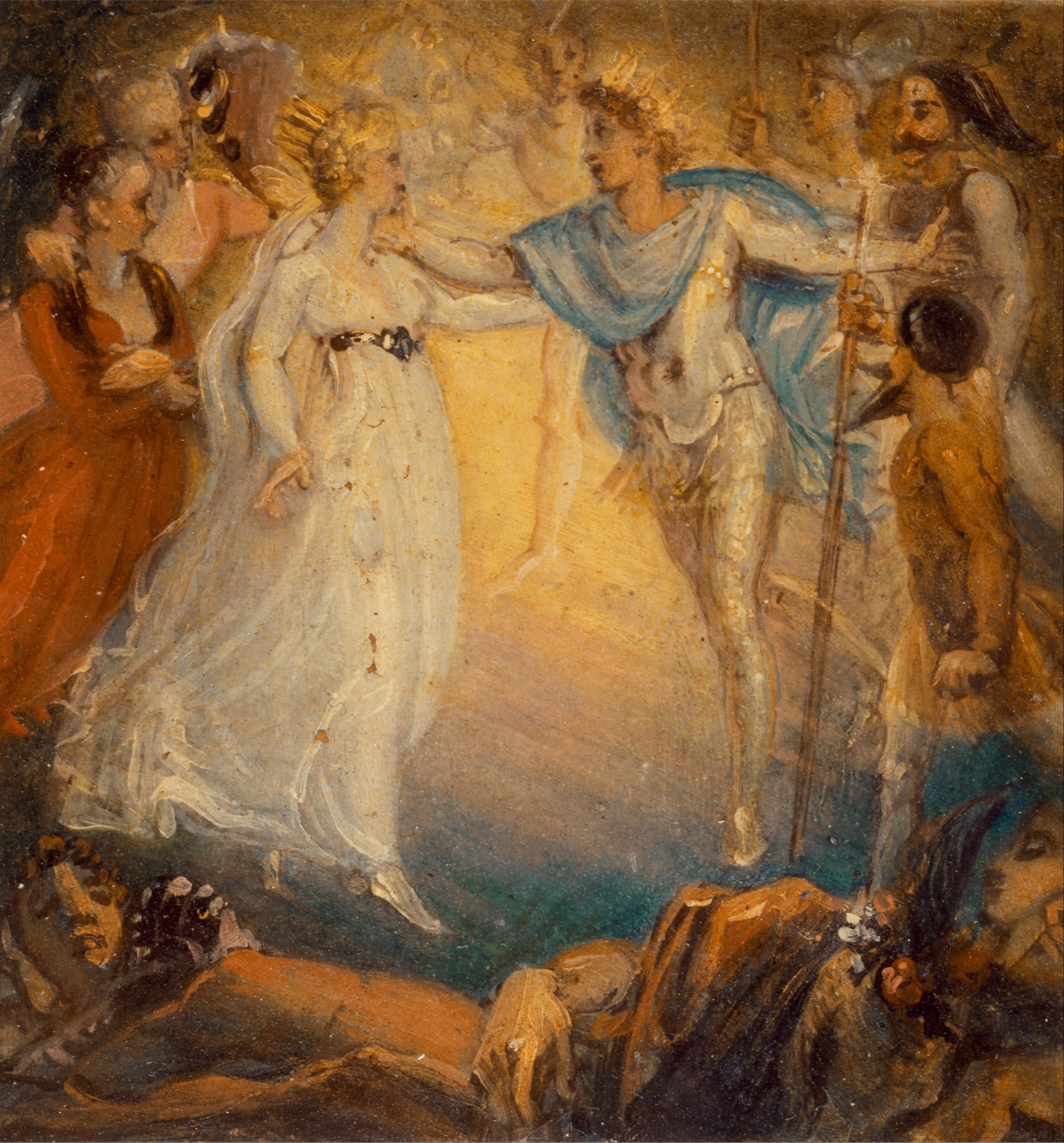
Thomas Stothard – Oberon and Titania from A Midsummer Night's Dream, Act IV, Scene I

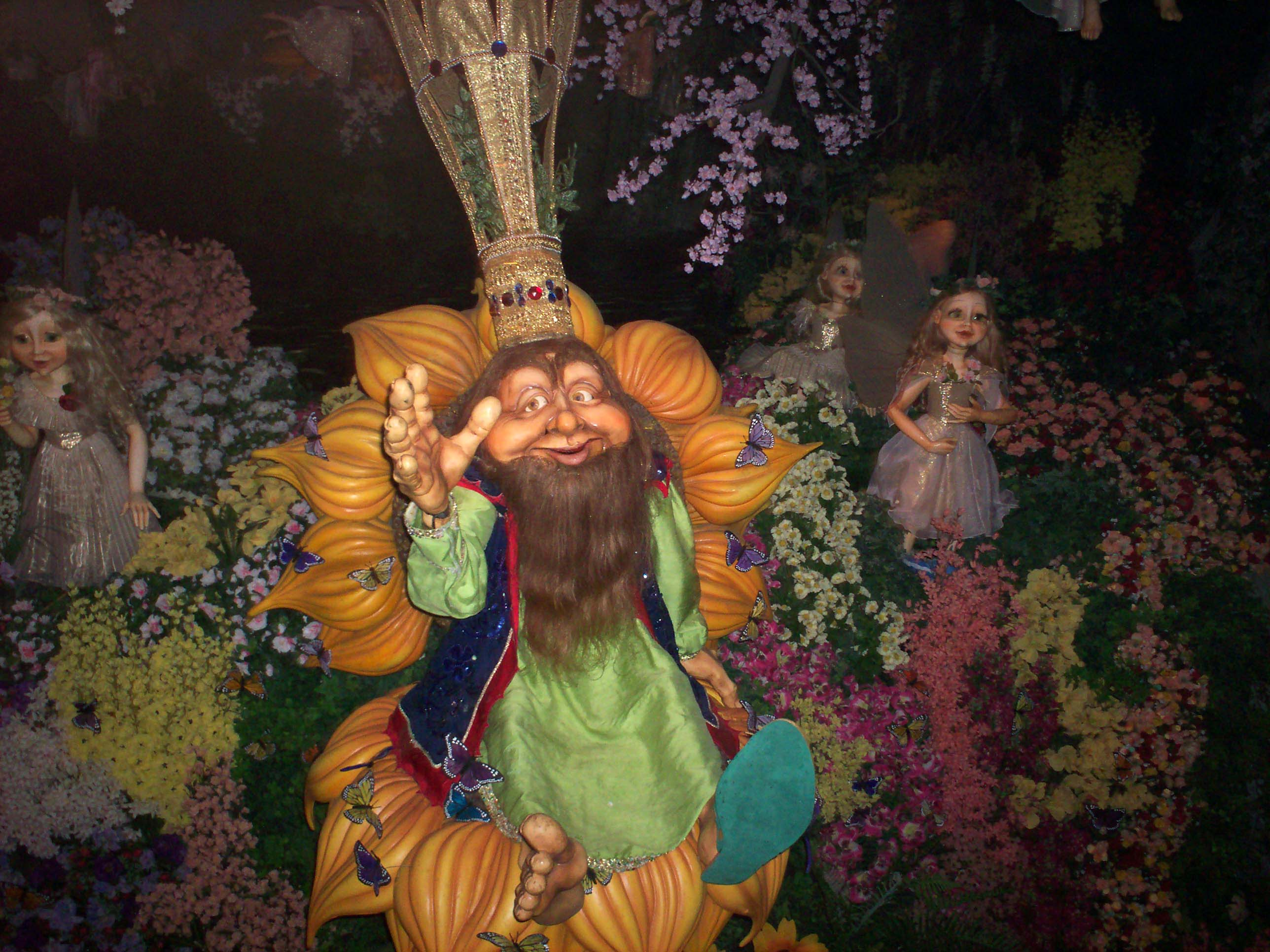
An animatronic depicts the character Oberon, King of the Elves in the Dutch fairytale theme park Efteling, designed by Ton van de Ven.

== See also ==
- Brag (folklore)
- Púca
- Pyramus and Thisbe
- Summer solstice

== Notes and references ==
All references to A Midsummer Night's Dream, unless otherwise specified, are taken from the Arden Shakespeare 2nd series edition. Under their referencing system, which uses roman numerals, III.i.55 means act 3 (Roman numerals in upper case), scene 1 (Roman numerals lower case), line 55.

== Sources ==
=== Editions of A Midsummer Night's Dream ===
- Brooks, Harold F., ed. (1979). A Midsummer Night's Dream. The Arden Shakespeare, 2nd series. Methuen & Co. ISBN 0-415-02699-7.

=== Secondary sources ===
- Ball, Robert Hamilton (2016) [first published 1968]. Shakespeare on Silent Film: A Strange Eventful History. Routledge Library Editions: Film and Literature. Vol. 1. London: Routledge. ISBN 978-1-138-99611-3.
- Barnes, Clive (18 April 1967). "Midsummer Night's Dream: Balanchine Helps Turn Classic into Film". The New York Times. ISSN 0362-4331. OCLC 1645522.
- "A Midsummer Night's Dream". BBC. 28 November 2005.
- Bevington, David (1996). "But We Are Spirits of Another Sort': The Dark Side of Love and Magic in 'A Midsummer Night's Dream'". In Dutton, Richard (ed.). A Midsummer Night's Dream. New York: St. Martin's Press. pp. 24–35. ISBN 978-0-333-60197-6.
- Broich, Ulrich (2006). "Oberon and Titania in the City Park: The Magic of Other Texts as the Subject of Der Park by Botho Strauß". In Jansohn, Christa (ed.). German Shakespeare Studies at the Turn of the Twenty-first Century. International studies in Shakespeare and his contemporaries. Newark, Delaware: University of Delaware Press. pp. 144–60. ISBN 978-0-87413-911-2.
- Cavendish, Dominic (21 June 2014). "10 things you didn't know about A Midsummer Night's Dream". The Telegraph. Archived from the original on 29 September 2016.
- Charles, Gerard (2000). "A Midsummer Night's Dream". BalletMet. Archived from the original on 1 May 2011.
- Forward, Stephanie (1 August 2006). "A reader's guide to Lords And Ladies". The Open University. Archived from the original on 7 October 2016.
- Garner, Shirley Nelson (1998). "A Midsummer Night's Dream: "Jack Shall Have Jill; / Nought Shall Go Ill"". In Kehler, Dorothea (ed.). A Midsummer Night's Dream: Critical Essays. Garland reference library of the humanities. Vol. 1900 (reprint ed.). Psychology Press. pp. 127–44. ISBN 978-0-8153-3890-1.
- Gibson, Gloria J. (1996). "Gone but Never Forgotten: B. McQueen, M. Sinclair, R. Cash and T. Cade Bambara". Black Camera. 11 (1). Indiana University Press: 3–4. eISSN 1947-4237. ISSN 1536-3155. JSTOR 27761473.
- Green, Douglas E. (1998). "Preposterous Pleasures: Queer Theories and A Midsummer Night's Dream". In Kehler, Dorothea (ed.). A Midsummer Night's Dream: Critical Essays. Garland reference library of the humanities. Vol. 1900 (reprint ed.). Psychology Press. pp. 369–400. ISBN 978-0-8153-3890-1.
- Halliday, F. E. (1964). A Shakespeare Companion 1564–1964. Baltimore: Penguin.
- Howard, Jean E. (2003). "Feminist Criticism". In Wells, Stanley; Orlin, Lena Cowen (eds.). Shakespeare: An Oxford Guide. New York: Oxford University Press. pp. 411–23. ISBN 978-0-19-924522-2.
- Hunt, Maurice (1986). "Individuation in "A Midsummer Night's Dream"". South Central Review. 3 (2). The South Central Modern Language Association: 1–13. doi:10.2307/3189362. eISSN 1549-3377. ISSN 0743-6831. JSTOR 3189362.
- "The Donkey Show: A Midsummer Night's Disco". Internet Off-Broadway Database. n.d.
- Kehler, Dorothea (1998). "A Midsummer Night's Dream: A Bibliographic Survey of the Criticism". In Kehler, Dorothea (ed.). A Midsummer Night's Dream: Critical Essays. Garland reference library of the humanities. Vol. 1900 (reprint ed.). Psychology Press. pp. 3–76. ISBN 978-0-8153-3890-1.
- Kiernan, Victor Gordon (1993). Shakespeare, Poet and Citizen. London: Verso. ISBN 978-0-86091-392-4.
- Kimber, Marian Wilson (2006). "Reading Shakespeare, Seeing Mendelssohn: Concert Readings of A Midsummer Night's Dream, ca. 1850–1920". The Musical Quarterly. 89 (2/3). Oxford University Press: 199–236. doi:10.1093/musqtl/gdm002. eISSN 1741-8399. ISSN 0027-4631. JSTOR 25172840.
- MacQueen, Scott (2009). "Midsummer Dream, Midwinter Nightmare: Max Reinhardt and Shakespeare versus the Warner Bros". The Moving Image: The Journal of the Association of Moving Image Archivists. 9 (2). University of Minnesota Press: 30–103. doi:10.1353/mov.2010.0012. eISSN 1542-4235. ISSN 1532-3978. JSTOR 41164591. S2CID 191461112.
- Mancewicz, Aneta (2014). Intermedial Shakespeares on European Stages. Palgrave Studies in Performance and Technology. Springer. ISBN 978-1-137-36004-5.
- Marks, Peter (28 May 1999). "More a Backstage Bacchanal Than a Midsummer Dream". The New York Times. ISSN 0362-4331. Archived from the original on 22 April 2016.
- Marshall, David (1982). "Exchanging Visions: Reading A Midsummer Night's Dream". ELH. 49 (3). The Johns Hopkins University Press: 543–75. doi:10.2307/2872755. eISSN 1080-6547. ISSN 0013-8304. JSTOR 2872755. S2CID 163807169.
- Montrose, Louis (2000). "The Imperial Votaress". In Brown, Richard Danson; Johnson, David (eds.). A Shakespeare Reader: Sources and Criticism. London: Macmillan Press. pp. 60–71. ISBN 978-0-312-23039-5.
- O'Donovan, Gerard (30 May 2016). "Russell T Davies made Shakespeare engaging, fresh and funny". The Telegraph. Archived from the original on 5 August 2016.
- Reynolds, Norman (14 July 2006). "Ein Sommernachtstraum" [A Midsummer Night's Dream]. Ballet.co.uk. Archived from the original on 29 November 2014.
- "Stage History". The Royal Shakespeare Company. n.d. Archived from the original on 13 December 2016.
- "Shakespeare in the Arb". University of Michigan. n.d. Archived from the original on 23 June 2016.
- Slights, William W. E. (1988). "The Changeling in A Dream". SEL: Studies in English Literature 1500–1900. 28 (2, Elizabethan and Jacobean Drama). Rice University: 259–72. doi:10.2307/450551. eISSN 1522-9270. ISSN 0039-3657. JSTOR 450551.
- Tennenhouse, Leonard (1986). Power on Display: The Politics of Shakespeare's Genres. Routledge library editions: Shakespeare. Vol. 48 (reprint ed.). New York: Routledge. ISBN 978-0-415-35315-1.
- Twyning, John (2012). Forms of English History in Literature, Landscape, and Architecture. New York: Springer Nature. ISBN 978-1-137-28470-9.
- "Planet and Satellite Names and Discoverers". USGS. n.d.
- Waleson, Heidi (25 January 2011). "A Remarkably Inventive A Cappella Premiere". The Wall Street Journal. ISSN 0099-9660. OCLC 781541372.
- Watts, Richard W. (1972). "Films of a Moonstruck World". In Eckert, Charles W. (ed.). Focus on Shakespearean Films. Film focus. Prentice-Hall. ISBN 978-0-13-807644-3.
- Whittall, Arnold (1998). "Midsummer Night's Dream, A". In Sadie, Stanley (ed.). The New Grove Dictionary of Opera. The New Grove Dictionary of Opera. Vol. 3 (8 ed.). Macmillan Publishers. ISBN 0-333-73432-7 – via Grove Music Online.
- Wiles, David (2008). "The Carnivalesque in A Midsummer Night's Dream". In Bloom, Harold; Marson, Janyce (eds.). A Midsummer Night's Dream. Bloom's Shakespeare Through the Ages. New York: Bloom's Literary Criticism. pp. 208–23. ISBN 978-0-7910-9595-9.
- Wiles, David (1993). Shakespeare's Almanac: A Midsummer Night's Dream, Marriage and the Elizabethan Calendar. Woodbridge: D.S.Brewer. ISBN 0859913988.
