= A Midsummer Night's Dream (1999 film) =

1999 film by Michael Hoffman

- Theatrical release poster
- Directed by: Michael Hoffman
- Screenplay by: Michael Hoffman
- Based on: A Midsummer Night's Dream; 1600 play by William Shakespeare
- Produced by: Leslie Urdang; Michael Hoffman
- Starring: Rupert Everett; Calista Flockhart; Kevin Kline; Michelle Pfeiffer; Stanley Tucci; Christian Bale; Sophie Marceau; David Strathairn
- Cinematography: Oliver Stapleton
- Edited by: Garth Craven
- Music by: Simon Boswell
- Production company: Regency Enterprises
- Distributed by: Fox Searchlight Pictures
- Release dates: May 14, 1999 (United States); October 21, 1999 (Germany)
- Running time: 116 minutes
- Countries: United States; Germany
- Languages: English; Italian
- Budget: $11 million
- Box office: $16.1 million

A Midsummer Night's Dream is a 1999 fantasy romantic comedy film written, produced, and directed by Michael Hoffman, based on the 1595 play of the same name by William Shakespeare. The ensemble cast features Kevin Kline as Bottom, Michelle Pfeiffer and Rupert Everett as Titania and Oberon, Stanley Tucci as Puck, and Calista Flockhart, Anna Friel, Christian Bale, and Dominic West as the four lovers.

A Midsummer Night's Dream was released by Fox Searchlight Pictures on May 14, 1999 in the United States, and by 20th Century Fox on October 21, 1999 in Germany. The film received positive reviews from critics and grossed $16.1 million against an $11 million budget.

== Plot ==
In 1890s Monte Athena, in the Kingdom of Italy, as Duke Theseus and Hippolyta's wedding banquet preparations are underway, young Hermia's father Egeus approaches him. He requests the Duke support his promise of his daughter's hand to Demetrius, at threat of her death if she does not comply. Theseus gives Hermia four days to choose to marry Demetrius, join a convent or die.

As the lovers Lysander and Hermia are forbidden to marry, the pair make plans to flee to the forest to escape the arrangement. They confide in Hermia's friend Helena, who is in anguish over Demetrius because she is desperately in love with him after they had had an affair.

Meanwhile, theater director Peter Quince assigns parts to his upcoming production based on the tragedy of Pyramus and Thisbe. After the townspeople make a mockery of actor Nick Bottom, the acting troupe decide to take rehearsals to the forest.

Helena informs Demetrius of Hermia and Lysander's plan, then follows him into the woods like a lovesick puppy. He tries to disuade her, but she persists as her love is more of an obsession. Once in the forest, they wander into the fairy world, ruled by Oberon and Titania, King and Queen of the fairies.

Oberon observes them and he and his servant sprite Puck cause mayhem using a potion made of a special flower. It, when applied to the eyes, makes the person fall in love with the first person they see. Oberon puts it on Titania's eyes. Puck uses the magic potion on Lysander while he sleeps, and Helena wakes him, fearing him dead. He suddenly forgets about Hermia, chasing Helena through the woods.

Meanwhile, the acting troupe, preparing the play for the entertainment of the Duke, rehearse in the forest. The mischievous Puck magically enchants Bottom with the head of a donkey and he is then seen by the bewitched Titania. She woos him in her bower, attended by fairies.

Upon Oberon's orders, Puck uses the magic potion on the sleeping Demetrius. He also falls in love with Helena, creating a rift between the four of them that ultimately culminates in a mud-wrestling confrontation.

Oberon tires of the sport and restores order, pairing Lysander back with Hermia using another flower to undo the spell. Demetrius is let be with Helena, and he reconciles with his own queen Titania with the second flower.

Theseus and Hippolyta's riding party comes across the couples sleeping naked in a field. As the couples declare their love, Demetrius with Helena and Lysander with Hermia, the Duke and future bride invite the other couples to also wed in their ceremony, much to Egeus' chagrin.

Bottom also wakes in a field, transformed back into fully human form. What happened with the fairy seems a dream. However, he is left a gold ring that has a woodland appearance.

Bottom and his troupe of "rude mechanicals" perform their amateur play before Duke Theseus, his wife Hippolyta, the other two couples and the court at the wedding celebration, producing a tragedy that unintentionally turns into a comedy. As the newlywed couples consummate their marriages, the fairies bless their unions.

== Cast ==
- Kevin Kline as Nick Bottom
- Michelle Pfeiffer as Titania
- Rupert Everett as Oberon
- Stanley Tucci as Puck
- Calista Flockhart as Helena
- Anna Friel as Hermia
- Christian Bale as Demetrius
- Dominic West as Lysander
- David Strathairn as Theseus
- Sophie Marceau as Hippolyta
- Roger Rees as Peter Quince
- Max Wright as Robin Starveling
- Gregory Jbara as Snug
- Bill Irwin as Tom Snout
- Sam Rockwell as Francis Flute
- Bernard Hill as Egeus
- John Sessions as Philostrate

== Production ==
A Midsummer Night's Dream was shot at Cinecittà Studios in Rome, as well as in Caprarola and Montepulciano, Italy. The action of the play was transported from Athens, Greece, to a fictional Monte Athena, located in the Tuscany region of Italy, although all textual mentions of Athens were retained.

The film made use of Felix Mendelssohn's incidental music for an 1843 stage production (including the famous Wedding March), alongside operatic works from Giuseppe Verdi, Gaetano Donizetti, Vincenzo Bellini, Gioacchino Rossini and Pietro Mascagni.

The score also includes a recording of Renée Fleming singing the aria "Casta diva" from Bellini's opera Norma.

== Home media ==
The film was released on VHS and DVD on November 30, 1999.

== Critical reception ==
On the review aggregator website Rotten Tomatoes, the film holds an approval rating of 67% based on 79 reviews, with an average rating of 6.3/10. The website's critics consensus reads, "Faultless production and shining performances display the Bard's talent propitiously." Metacritic, which uses a weighted average, assigned the film a score of 61 out of 100 based on 24 critics, indicating "generally favorable" reviews. Many critics singled out Kevin Kline and Stanley Tucci for particular praise.

In The New York Times, Janet Maslin wrote:

Michael Hoffman's fussy production of A Midsummer Night's Dream is just such a parade of incongruities, with performances ranging from the sublime to the you-know-what ... Not even Michelle Pfeiffer's commanding loveliness as the fairy queen Titania, and her ability to speak of such things as 'my bower' with perfect ease, can offset the decision to have the actors grapple awkwardly with bicycles ... The hoodwinked characters of A Midsummer Night's Dream are meant to be mismatched much of the time. But not like this. The distraught Helena, played as a hand-waving, eye-rolling ditz by Calista Flockhart, hardly fits into the same film with David Strathairn's reserved Duke Theseus, or with Rupert Everett as a slinky Oberon. Everett, like the inspired Kevin Kline as the ham actor Bottom, is utterly at ease with this material in ways that many other cast members are not ... Though West and especially Ms. Friel approach their roles with gratifying ease, Bale is once again given the cheesecake treatment and little occasion to rise above it. This production tarts up the play any way it can ... The theatrical carryings-on of Bottom and company provide the film's best attempts at comedy. Staging a play about Pyramus and Thisbe with a troupe including Bill Irwin, Roger Rees and Sam Rockwell (as the beauteous heroine), Bottom's acting company delights its late-19th-century audience in ways Hoffman's film can only occasionally manage. In a completely unexpected turn, Rockwell moves the sceptical and bemused audience to tears as he performs Thisbe's scene reacting to the death of Pyramus, proving that he alone among the band of actors has any real talent for the craft.

In the Chicago Sun-Times, Roger Ebert wrote:

Michael Hoffman's new film of William Shakespeare's A Midsummer Night's Dream (who else's?) is updated to the 19th century, set in Italy and furnished with bicycles and operatic interludes. But it is founded on Shakespeare's language and is faithful, by and large, to the original play... It's wonderful to behold Pfeiffer's infatuation with the donkey-eared Bottom, who she winds in her arms as 'doth the woodbine the sweet honeysuckle gently twist'; her love is so real, we almost believe it. Kline's Bottom tactfully humors her mad infatuation, good-natured and accepting. And Tucci's Puck suggests sometimes that he has a darker side, but it not so much malicious as incompetent.

In the San Francisco Chronicle, Peter Stack wrote:

Purists will quibble, but William Shakespeare's A Midsummer Night's Dream is a playful, sexy piece of work - just what the Bard might have conjured up for a movie adaptation of his beloved spring-fever comedy. The film is over the top - and willfully so ... As might be expected, Kevin Kline steals the show with his hearty gifts for comedy ... Kline, a Shakespearean veteran, has that flourish, that golden touch. In his glorious way of overdoing it - turning the very notion of acting into farce - he embodies a supreme comic madness that is audacious yet embracing ... Michelle Pfeiffer plays it regal, pouty and come-hither as Titania. Her seduction of Bottom, turned to an ass under the spell of Puck (Stanley Tucci with horns and impish grin), is riotous ... A real surprise is the sly comic depth of Calista Flockhart's bicycle-riding Helena, miles from Ally McBeal ... Rupert Everett is imperious as Oberon, the jealous fairy king, and Tucci's Puck is amusingly tweaky as he keeps messing up his missions to drop magic nectar into lovers' eyes.

In Time Out New York, Andrew Johnston wrote:

A strangely uneven adaptation of the Bard's most famous comedy, Michael Hoffman's Dream is, if nothing else, admirable for its lack of a contrived gimmick. Yes, the story has been transplanted to Tuscany in the 1890s, and the cast is packed with big names, but Hoffman rightly treats the text as the real star of the show. The film soars when actors who remember that Shakespeare was primarily an entertainer carry the ball, but things get pretty turgid when the focus is on those who seem cowed by appearing in an adaptation of a Major Literary Classic.

In The Washington Post, Jane Horwitz wrote:

Instead of Shakespeare's Athens, Hoffman dreams his Dream in a gorgeous Tuscan hill town at the turn of the century, with production designer Luciana Arrighi and costume designer Gabriella Pescucci creating a luscious milieu of dusty green shutters, olive groves and vineyards reminiscent of the 1986 Merchant-Ivory gem A Room With a View ... some in the cast negotiate Shakespeare's lines better than others. Kevin Kline's stage savvy serves him especially well as a movie-stealing Bottom.

Also in The Washington Post, Desson Howe wrote:

After watching William Shakespeare's 'A Midsummer Night's Dream, Michael Hoffman's adaptation of the romantic comedy, I'm left with more admiration than fairy dust. But it was pleasurable all the same... Kline and Flockhart do most of the pedaling. When Kline gets goofy – as he did in A Fish Called Wanda and In & Out, he's an irresistible, madcap Errol Flynn, twisting his good looks into hilarious contortions. And Flockhart exudes a wonderful vulnerability and sense of comic timing, as she pursues Demetrius, suffering all manner of indignity and incredulity along the way.

In Variety, Emanuel Levy described the film as a "whimsical, intermittently enjoyable but decidedly unmagical version of the playwright's wild romantic comedy ... There is not much chemistry between Pfeiffer and Everett, nor between Pfeiffer and Kline, particularly in their big love scene. Kline overacts physically and emotionally, Flockhart is entertaining in a broad manner, and Pfeiffer renders a strenuously theatrical performance. Overall, the Brits give more coherent and resonant performances, especially Friel and West as the romantic couple, a restrained Everett as Oberon, and Rees as the theatrical manager."

Time Out London wrote that "this Dream is middlebrow and unashamed of it. Injecting the film with fun and pathos, Kline makes a superb Bottom; it's his play and he acts it to the hilt."

== See also ==
- List of William Shakespeare screen adaptations
