= Snug (A Midsummer Night's Dream) =

Character in A Midsummer Night's Dream

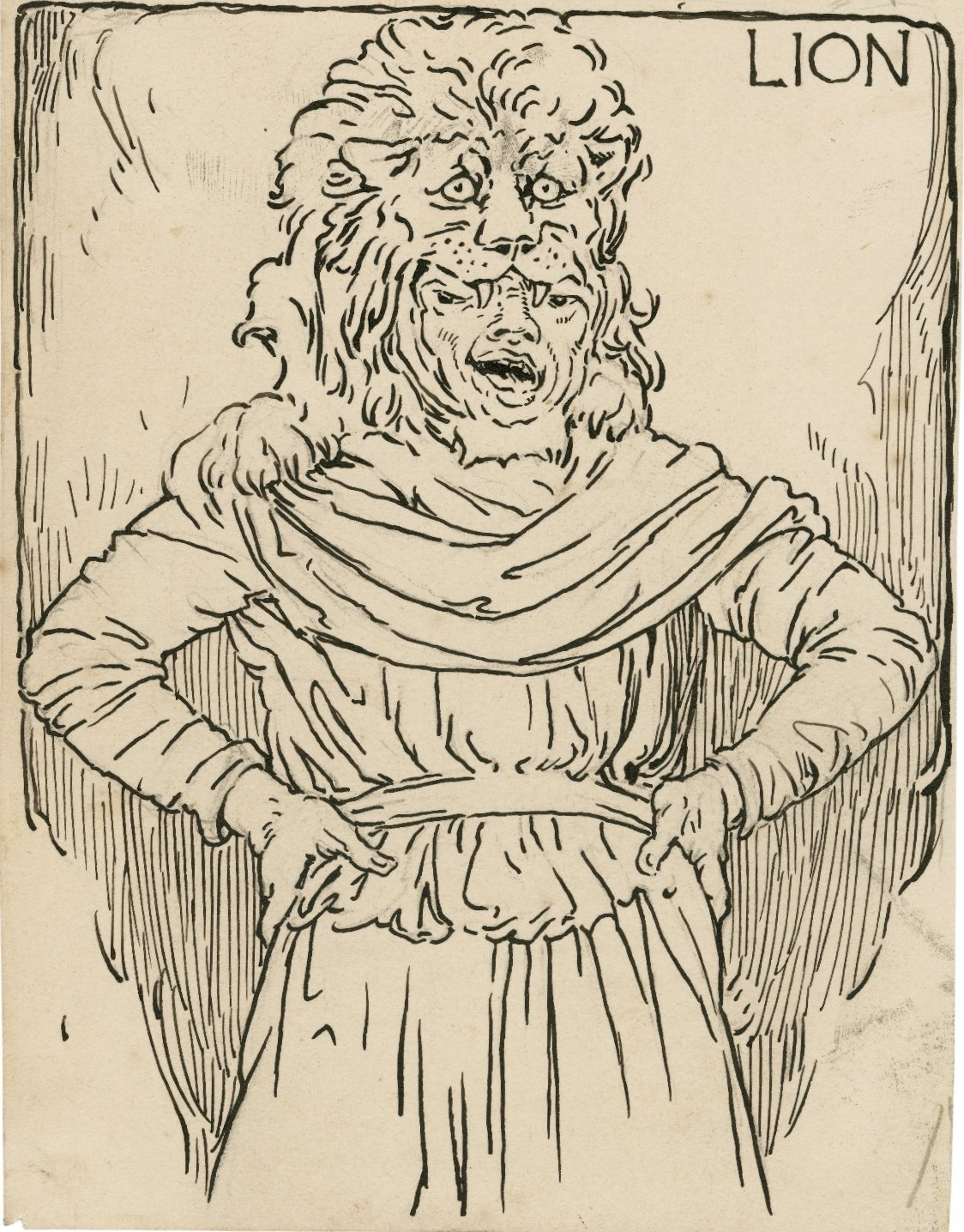
Snug playing the Lion in the play-within-the-play Pyramus and Thisbe, within William Shakespeare's A Midsummer Night's Dream. Illustration by Louis Rhead for an edition of Charles and Mary Lamb's Tales from Shakespeare (1918).

Snug is a minor character from William Shakespeare's play A Midsummer Night's Dream. He is a joiner who comes from Athens who is hired by Peter Quince to play the part of the lion in Pyramus and Thisbe. When he is first assigned the part, he is afraid it may take him a while to finally remember his lines (even though the lion's role was nothing but roaring originally). Bottom offers to play the part of the lion (as he offers to play all other parts), but he is rejected by Quince, who worries (as do the other characters) that his loud and ferocious roar in the play will frighten the ladies of power in the audience and get Quince and all his actors hanged. In the end, the lion's part is revised to explain that he is in fact not a lion and means the audience no harm.

== Portrayal ==
Snug is often played as a stupid man, a manner describing almost all of the Mechanicals.

Snug is the only Mechanical to whom the playwright did not assign a first name.

In Jean-Louis and Jules Supervielle's French adaptation, Le Songe d'une nuit d'été (1959), Snug is renamed Asène to As, where Georges Neveux's 1945 adaptation used the English names.

On the Elizabethan stage, the role of Snug and the other Mechanicals was intended to be doubled with Titania's four fairy escorts: Moth, Mustardseed, Cobweb, and Peaseblossom.

== Sources ==
- Blits, Jan H. (2003). The Soul of Athens: Shakespeare's A Midsummer Night's Dream. Lexington Books. ISBN 9780739106532.
- Brooks, Harold, ed. (1979). A Midsummer Night's Dream. The Arden Shakespeare, second series. London: Bloomsbury Publishing. doi:10.5040/9781408188095.00000022. ISBN 9781408188095.
- Weiner, Andrew D. (1971). "'Multiformitie Uniforme': A Midsummer Night's Dream". ELH. 38 (3). The Johns Hopkins University Press: 329–349. doi:10.2307/2872222. eISSN 1080-6547. ISSN 0013-8304. JSTOR 2872222.
- White, Kenneth S. (1960). "Two French Versions of A Midsummer Night's Dream". The French Review. 33 (4). American Association of Teachers of French: 341–350. ISSN 0016-111X. JSTOR 383649.

== See also ==
- Mechanical (character)
