= Robin Starveling =

Character in A Midsummer Night's Dream

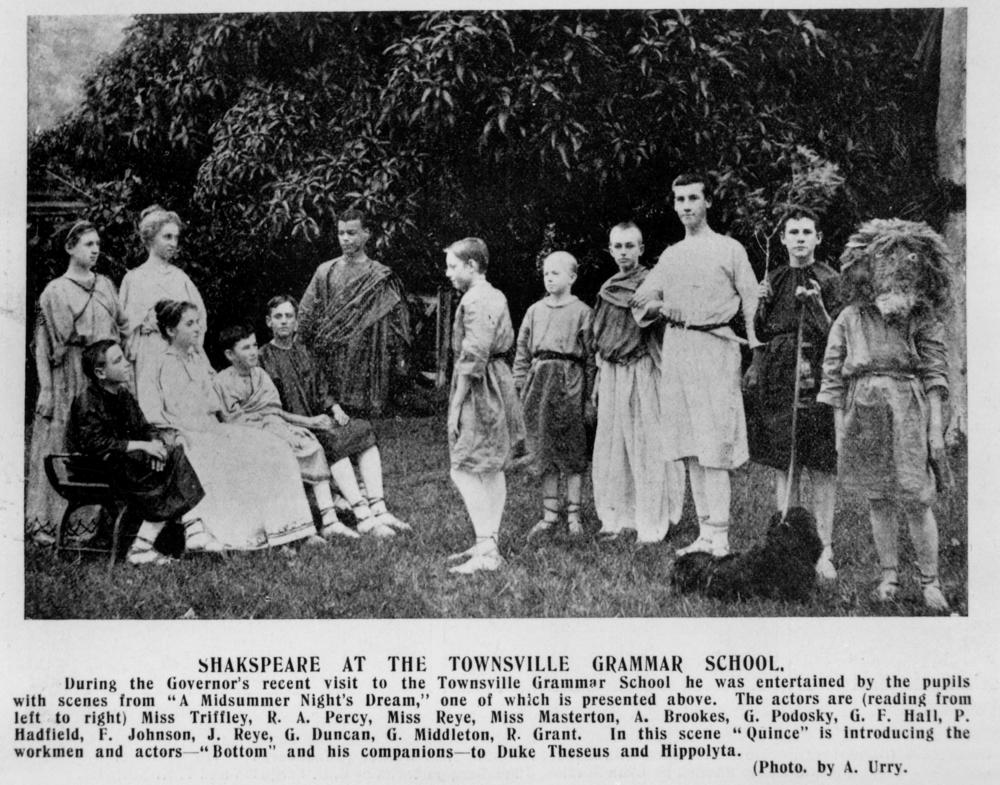
Robin Starveling as Moonshine (second from right), with thorn-bush and dog, in a 1907 student production

Robin Starveling is a character in William Shakespeare's A Midsummer Night's Dream (1596), one of the Rude Mechanicals of Athens who plays the part of Moonshine in their performance of Pyramus and Thisbe. His part is often considered one of the more humorous in the play, as he uses a lantern in a failed attempt to portray Moonshine and is wittily derided by his audience.

== Role in the play ==
In A Midsummer Night's Dream, Theseus, the Duke of Athens, is preparing to marry Hippolyta. Peter Quince decides to entertain her and hires a group of actors nicknamed the Rude Mechanicals to perform Pyramus and Thisbe, a love story. Robin is one of the Rude Mechanicals, the tailor, who gathers with his colleagues to prepare their production. Robin at first is told to play the part of Thisbe's mother, but Peter Quince points out that a love story needs moonlight shining on the lovers to have any real effect on the audience. After Nick Bottom suggests looking in the almanac for a time when the Moon might shine on their performance, the players apparently decide that they will just have Robin act as Moonshine. Robin's role as Moonshine in The Mechanical's performance of Pyramus and Thisbe before Theseus' court is often highlighted by scholars as among the funnier parts of the play. Although the court makes fun of all the players, Starveling is mocked the most by Hippolyta, who is very vocal in her opinion that his attempt to be moonshine is a ridiculous failure, although very humorous. He is also the only mechanical to be cut off in his monologue as opposed to being mocked afterwards, causing him to fluster and summarise his lines rather than giving them. This summary is usually played angrily or irritably, but has also been performed as the climax of Starveling's potential stage fright. Starveling is the member of the group that seems to be afraid of just about anything. Starveling is the most ambiguous in taking sides in the power struggle between Bottom and Quince. While Snout affirms whatever Quince says and Flute always looks to Bottom for the final word on something (Snug is too slow to be bothered), Starveling seems to try to agree completely with both, as impossible as it is to do so.

== Context ==
"Starveling" is a word for a thin or poor person lacking food. "Robin" may have connections to two of Queen Elizabeth's suitors, Robert Dudley, Earl of Leicester, and Robert Devereux, 2nd Earl of Essex. Elizabeth's pet name for both of these men was "Robin", leading scholars to believe that Robin Starveling may be a satiric creation of Shakespeare's in their honour (or dishonour). Another suitor, Duke François ("Francis") Hercule Alençon, may have similar connections with Francis Flute. It may also be a nod to the fact that tailors of the time were usually poor and skinny. In the 1935 Max Reinhardt film, he was played by the chubby, jovial Otis Harlan.

== Analysis ==
"All that I have to say, is, to tell you that the lanthorn [lantern] is the moon; I, the man in the moon; this thorn-bush, my thorn-bush; and this dog, my dog."

— Robin Starveling as Moonshine in A Midsummer Night's Dream

Shakespeare constantly reflects on the problem of synecdoche in his plays, a rhetorical term meaning "the part representing the whole". For example, in Henry V, Shakespeare has the Prologue beg forgiveness of the audience for attempting to portray an entire army with a few men, and for portraying so great a man as the King with a feeble actor. Shakespeare explores these same problems through Robin Starveling. The Mechanicals' decision to use Robin as moonlight in place of actual moonlight delves into the problem of synecdoche, of trying to represent something greater than yourself. Robin's standing there, attempting to be moonshine, does not make him so, even if he is holding a lantern to represent at least a part of the Moon. Similarly, Shakespeare seems to be arguing that no representation of anything in a play can really be completely real or truthful, no matter how hard its players may try. Rather than begging forgiveness of the viewer, he is exaggerating the problem for their entertainment.

The deriding reactions of the members of the upper class watching Robin and his colleagues' performance would have been familiar to even the more professional actors in Shakespeare's day. Some scholars have seen in Theseus' words about the performance a note of sympathy and pleading the cause of the actor: "For never anything can be amiss / when simpleness and duty tender it ..."
