= Wood Love =

1925 film by Hans Neumann

- Directed by: Hans Neumann
- Written by: Klabund; Hans Behrendt; Hans Neumann
- Based on: A Midsummer Night's Dream by William Shakespeare
- Starring: Werner Krauss; Valeska Gert; Alexander Granach; Hans Albers
- Cinematography: Reimar Kuntze; Guido Seeber
- Music by: Hans May
- Production company: Neumann-Filmproduktion
- Distributed by: UFA
- Release date: 10 March 1925
- Running time: 80 minutes
- Country: Germany
- Languages: Silent; German intertitles

Wood Love (German title: Ein Sommernachtstraum) is a 1925 German silent comedy film directed by Hans Neumann and starring Werner Krauss, Valeska Gert and Alexander Granach. It was an adaptation of William Shakespeare's A Midsummer Night's Dream.

Ernö Metzner worked as the film's art director.

== Preservation ==
A Midsummer Night's Dream (Ein Sommernachtstraum) was preserved and restored by the UCLA Film & Television Archive and The Film Foundation from a 35mm nitrate silent tinted print. Restoration funding was provided by Hobson/Lucas Family Foundation. The restoration had its Los Angeles premiere at the 2024 UCLA Festival of Preservation.

== Cast ==
- Werner Krauss as Bottom
- Valeska Gert as Puck
- Alexander Granach as Waldschrat

and in alphabetical order

- Hans Albers as Demetrius
- Charlotte Ander as Hermia
- Theodor Becker as Theseus
- Hans Behrendt
- Wilhelm Bendow as Flaut
- Paul Biensfeldt
- Walter Brandt as Schnock
- Tamara Geva as Oberon
- Ernst Gronau as Squenz
- Armand Guerra as Wenzel
- Paul Günther as Egeus
- Martin Jacob as Schlucker
- Adolf Klein
- Lori Leux as Titania
- André Mattoni as Lysander
- Fritz Rasp as Schnauz
- Rose Veldtkirch
- Barbara von Annenkoff as Helena
- Ruth Weyher as Hippolyta
- Bruno Ziener as Milon

== Bibliography ==
- Kreimeier, Klaus. The Ufa Story: A History of Germany's Greatest Film Company, 1918-1945. University of California Press, 1999.
