= Francis Flute =

Character in A Midsummer day's Dream

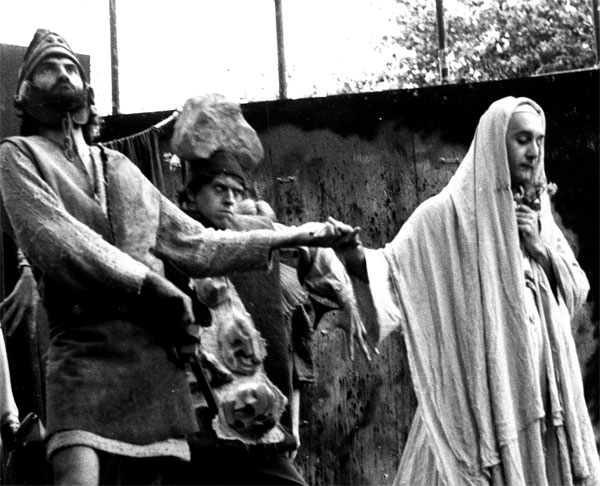
Francis Flute (right) playing Thisbe in a 1978 Riverside Shakespeare Company production

Francis Flute is a character in William Shakespeare's A Midsummer Night's Dream. His occupation is a bellows-mender. He is forced to play the female role of Thisbe in "Pyramus and Thisbe", a play-within-the-play which is performed for Theseus' marriage celebration.

In the play Flute (Thisbe) speaks through the wall (played by Tom Snout) to Pyramus (Nick Bottom).

Flute is a young, excited actor who is disappointed when he finds he is meant to play a woman (Thisbe) in their interlude before the duke and the duchess. He generally is portrayed using a falsetto voice. He is an unsure actor who asks many questions.

Flute is often portrayed as the lowest in status of the Mechanicals, but his performance at the wedding of Theseus and Hippolyta arguably wins them favour at the court of the duke and duchess.

Flute's name, like that of the other mechanicals, is metonymical and derives from his craft: "Flute" references a church organ, an instrument prominently featuring the bellows a bellows-mender might be called upon to repair.

In Jean-Louis and Jules Supervielle's French adaptation, Le Songe d'une nuit d'été (1959), Flute is renamed to Tubulure, where Georges Neveux's 1945 adaptation used the English names.

On the Elizabethan stage, the role of Flute and the other Mechanicals was intended to be doubled with Titania's four fairy escorts: Moth (also spelled Mote), Mustardseed, Cobweb, and Peaseblossom.

== Sources ==
- Blits, Jan H. (2003). The Soul of Athens: Shakespeare's A Midsummer Night's Dream. Lexington Books. ISBN 9780739106532.
- Brooks, Harold, ed. (1979). A Midsummer Night's Dream. The Arden Shakespeare, second series. London: Bloomsbury Publishing. doi:10.5040/9781408188095.00000022. ISBN 9781408188095.
- Weiner, Andrew D. (1971). ""Multiformitie Uniforme": A Midsummer Night's Dream". ELH. 38 (3). The Johns Hopkins University Press: 329–349. doi:10.2307/2872222. eISSN 1080-6547. ISSN 0013-8304. JSTOR 2872222.
- White, Kenneth S. (1960). "Two French Versions of A Midsummer Night's Dream". The French Review. 33 (4). American Association of Teachers of French: 341–350. ISSN 0016-111X. JSTOR 383649.

== See also ==
- Mechanical (character)
