= Philostrate =

Fictional character in A Midsummer Night's Dream

- A Midsummer Night's Dream character
- Created by: William Shakespeare
- Based on: "The Knight's Tale" by Geoffrey Chaucer

Philostrate (/ˈfɪləstreɪt/; meaning "lover of battle") is a fictional character in a number of literary works, including William Shakespeare's A Midsummer Night's Dream (1596). In that play, he is the Master of the Revels at Theseus' court, meaning he is in charge of his lord's entertainments, making recommendations to Theseus, as well as altering the text of some of the plays performed in his court. Shakespeare may have used this character to poke fun at play censorship in London at the time. In early performances of the play, the actor who played this character probably also played the part of Egeus, Hermia's strict father. There is only one scene in act V where both Egeus and Philostrate are present, and in this scene Egeus' character would have taken all of Philostrate's lines as his own.

== Role in the play ==
As Theseus's head guard, Philostrate is asked to defend his Lord and also makes recommendations for plays to help while away the time. He is also the one who chooses plays for Theseus. Theseus rejects all of the plays except "Pyramus and Thisbe", which Philostrate has given a particularly bad review. He advises the betrothed king not to choose "The Mechanicals'" (the workers') play because it is badly rehearsed:

I have heard it over,
And it is nothing, nothing in the world,
Unless you can find sport in their [The Mechanicals'] intents,
Extremely stretched, & conned [learnt] with cruel pain,
To do you service.

Theseus, eager to please his fiancée, Hippolyta, and the rest of his court, chooses Pyramus and Thisbe despite Philostrate's efforts. Because of its amateurishness, the play turns out to be humorous.

== Context ==
Shakespeare is known for borrowing plots and characters from other stories, but the source of A Midsummer Night's Dream has proved difficult to trace. There is no clear parallel to its plot in the literature of his time. However, many of its characters' names and relationships are borrowed from Chaucer's Canterbury Tales and Philostrate is no exception. His name is the pseudonym adopted by Arcite upon covertly returning to Athens in The Knight's Tale to work for Theseus. (A Knight's Tale was dramatised nearly twenty years later by Shakespeare and Fletcher as The Two Noble Kinsmen.) Chaucer himself took the name Philostrate from Boccaccio's poem Il Filostrato, a story about Troilus and Criseyde. Because Chaucer's Arcite adopts this identity to become a servant at Theseus' court, it is possible that the Midsummer Night's Dream character is meant to be the same person in a continuation of the story. However, the two characters have little else in common. Another candidate for the source of Philostrate's character is Philostratus the Elder, the author of Comus, a play which has similarities to Midsummer Night's Dream.

Philostrate's duty in Theseus' court is to examine the play that Nick Bottom and the others are about to perform and to make suggestions for improvement. It is also his duty to advise Theseus on matters of entertainment. Theseus calls him "our usual manager of mirth". The official term for Philostrate's position in the court is the Master of the Revels.

In Shakespeare's day, the queen of England had her own Master of the Revels—appointed to oversee all entertainment in London. Before a play could be performed, its script had to go through him, and whenever the Queen wanted to see a play, he would make recommendations. By 1581 (over a decade before the writing of Dream), all plays had to be approved by the Master of Revels prior to being performed. Shakespeare seems to be poking fun at the profession through Philostrate. At one point, when Theseus asks Philostrate to recommend a play to help pass the time, he lists several which sound ridiculous, such as "the battle with the centaurs to be sung by an Athenian eunuch to the harp". These names are humorous examples of the types of plays that were actually being performed around the time of Dream. They were becoming old however, and, like Theseus, monarchs were searching for something new, refreshing, and sophisticated.

== Performances ==
In original performances of A Midsummer Night's Dream, the actor who played Egeus and the actor who played Philostrate were probably one and the same. This can be gathered through discrepancies between the First Folio and earlier quarto versions of the play. In act V, scene 1, for example, the quartos say "Call Philostrate" in several places where the 1623 Folio says "Call Egeus". This would be an easy mistake to make if one actor had spoken both parts in this scene. One actor filling both roles explains the jumbled dialogue in this scene. Howard Furness, editor of several Shakespeare editions, interprets this a little differently, saying that Shakespeare may not have originally intended both roles to be played by the same person, but that directors combined the roles to save money. In any case, act V, scene 1, is the only scene in which both men are present at the same time. In cases where one actor was playing both roles, Egeus' character would probably have filled both roles in this scene, absorbing Philostrate's lines into his own.

However, during act V, there is no mention of Egeus, nor does he have a speaking role. It is logical, however, that he would have been in attendance since it is also his daughter Hermia's wedding that the group is there to celebrate.
