= Ein Sommernachtstraum =

Ein Sommernachtstraum is the German title of Shakespeare's comedy A Midsummer Night's Dream.

Ein Sommernachtstraum may also refer to:

- A Midsummer Night's Dream (Mendelssohn), music composed by Felix Mendelssohn for the play, titled Ein Sommernachtstraum in German
- Wood Love, a 1925 silent film adaptation, released as Ein Sommernachtstraum in Germany

== See also ==
- (K)ein Sommernachtstraum, a 1985 orchestral composition by Alfred Schnittke
