= Tom Snout =

Character in A Midsummer Night's Dream

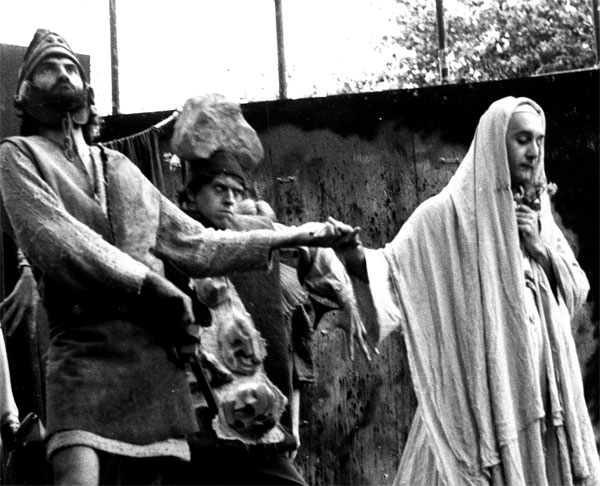
Tom Snout (background) playing Wall in a Riverside Shakespeare Company production

Tom Snout is a character in William Shakespeare's A Midsummer Night's Dream. He is a tinker, and one of the "mechanicals" of Athens, amateur players in Pyramus and Thisbe, a play within the play.

In the play-within-a-play, Snout plays the wall which separates Pyramus' and Thisbe's gardens. In Pyramus and Thisbe, the two lovers whisper to each other through Snout's fingers (representing a gap in the wall). Snout has eight lines under the name of Tom Snout, and two lines as The Wall. He is the Wall for Act V-Scene 1.

Snout was originally set to play Pyramus's father, but the need for a wall was greater, so he discharged The Wall. Snout is often portrayed as a reluctant actor and very frightened, but the other mechanicals (except Nick Bottom and Peter Quince) are usually much more frightened than Tom Snout.

Snout's name, like that of the other mechanicals, is a metonym and derives from his craft: "Snout" means a nozzle or a spout, a feature of the kettles a tinker often mends.

== Sources ==
- Blits, Jan H. (2003). The Soul of Athens: Shakespeare's A Midsummer Night's Dream. Lexington Books. ISBN 9780739106532.
- Brooks, Harold, ed. (1979). A Midsummer Night's Dream. The Arden Shakespeare, second series. London: Bloomsbury Publishing. doi:10.5040/9781408188095.00000022. ISBN 9781408188095.
