= Symphony No. 8 (Henze) =

1992–93 symphony by Hans Werner Henze

The Eighth Symphony by the German composer Hans Werner Henze was composed in 1992–93.

Using Shakespeare's A Midsummer Night's Dream as inspiration, it has a lighter theme than the major work it immediately follows, the Requiem of 1992. Each movement is inspired by a short section of the play: the first derives in part from Puck's line "I'll put a girdle round the earth/ In forty minutes". Henze depicts Puck's global journey in pitch variation: the East is middle C, the South Pole is the lowest notes in the modern symphony orchestra's range, while the North Pole is naturally at the opposite end of the range. The second movement depicts Titania's attempted seduction of Bottom, whilst the Adagio final movement takes Puck's If we shadows have offended speech at the end of the play.

It was premiered by the Boston Symphony Orchestra, who commissioned the piece (and to whom Henze dedicated it) under Seiji Ozawa on 1 October 1993.

== Movements ==
There are three movements:

1. Allegro
2. Allegramente con comodo tenerezza e ballabilità
3. Adagio
