= Mechanical (character) =

Set of six characters in A Midsummer Night's Dream

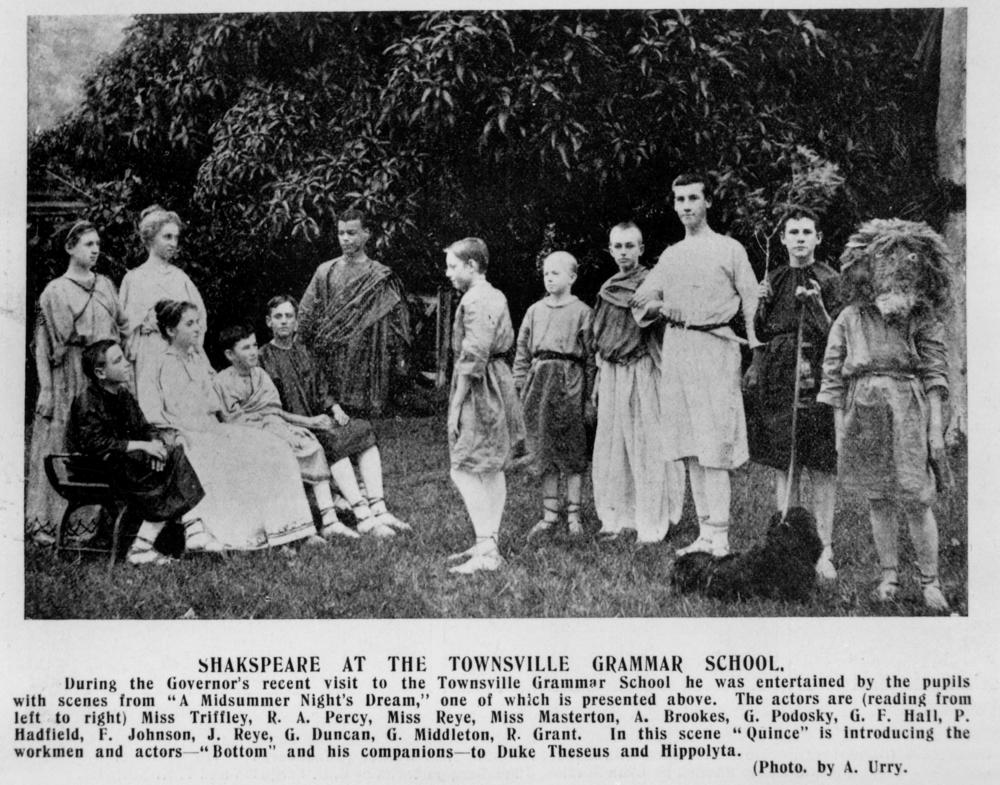
Robin Starveling as Moonshine (second from right), with thorn-bush and dog, in a 1907 student production

The mechanicals are six characters in A Midsummer Night's Dream who perform the play-within-a-play Pyramus and Thisbe. They are a group of amateur and mostly incompetent actors from around Athens, looking to make names for themselves by having their production chosen among several acts as the courtly entertainment for the royal wedding party of Theseus and Hippolyta. The servant-spirit Puck describes them as "rude mechanicals" in Act III, Scene 2 of the play, in reference to their occupations as skilled manual laborers.

The biggest ham among them, Nick Bottom, becomes the unlikely object of interest for the fairy queen Titania after she is charmed by a love potion and he is turned into a monster with the head of an ass by Puck.

The characters' names are Peter Quince, Snug, Nick Bottom, Francis Flute, Tom Snout, and Robin Starveling.

== Peter Quince ==
Peter Quince's name is derived from "quines" or "quoins", which are the strengthening blocks that form the outer corners of stone or brickwork in a building.

=== Playwriting ===
Quince's amateurish playwriting is usually taken to be a parody of the popular mystery plays of the pre-Elizabethan era, plays that were also produced by craftspeople. His metrical preferences are references to vernacular ballads.

Despite Quince's obvious shortcomings as a writer, Stanley Wells argues that he partly resembles Shakespeare himself. Both are from a craftsmanly background, both work quickly and both take secondary roles in their own plays. Robert Leach makes the same point.

In performing the play, Quince recites the prologue but struggles to fit his lines into the metre and make the rhymes. The noble audience makes jocular comments, while the rest of the mechanicals struggle (all except Bottom, who rather confidently improvises).

=== Characterization ===
Traditionally, Peter Quince is portrayed as a bookish character, caught up in the minute details of his play, but as a theatrical organizer. However, in the 1999 film version of A Midsummer Night's Dream, he is portrayed by Roger Rees as a strong character extremely capable of being a director. It is he who leads the search party looking for Nick Bottom in the middle of the play.

=== Cultural references ===
The character is named in the title of a Wallace Stevens poem, "Peter Quince at the Clavier", which is written in the first person as if spoken by Quince.

== Snug ==
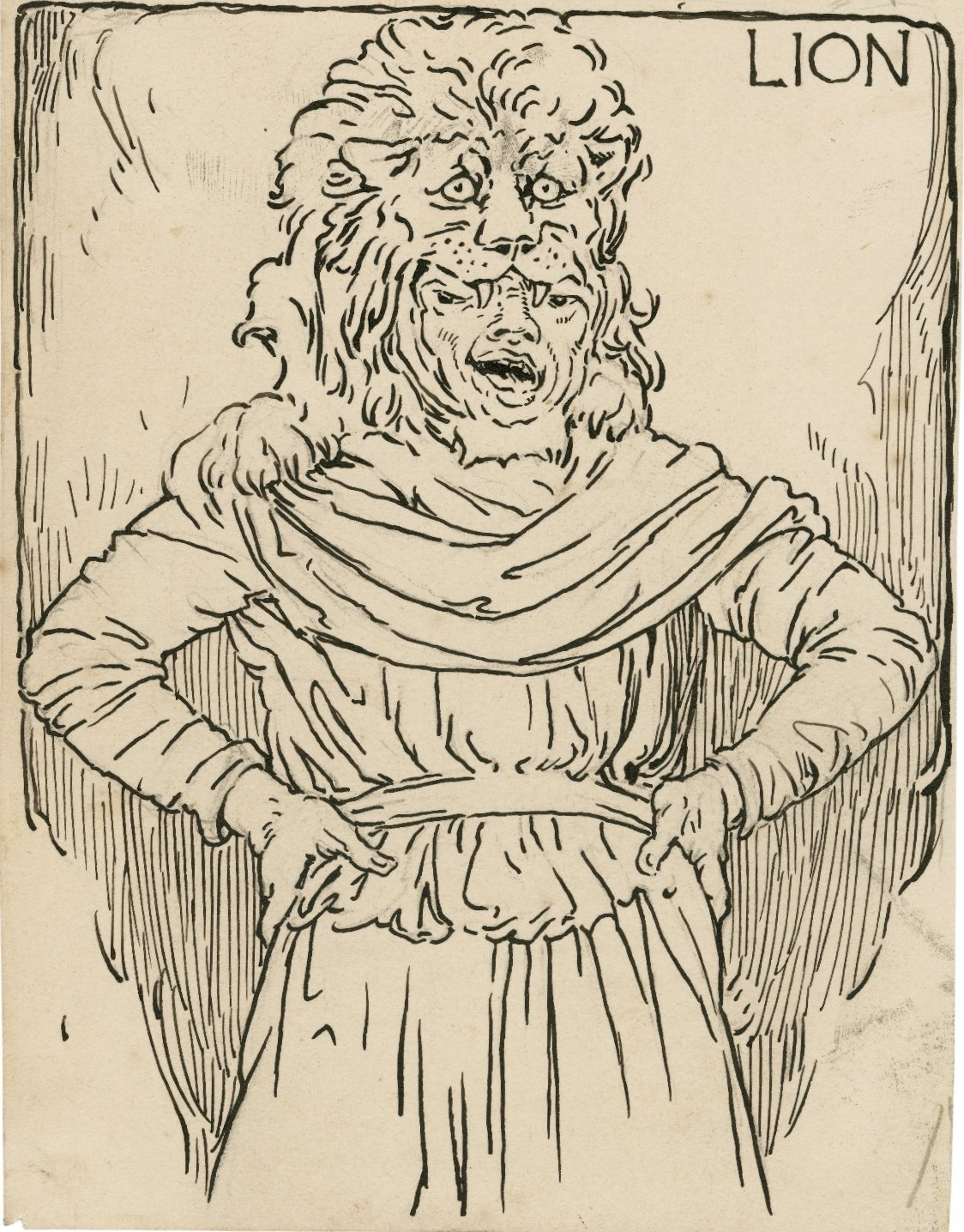
Snug playing the Lion in the play-within-the-play Pyramus and Thisbe, within William Shakespeare's A Midsummer Night's Dream. Illustration by Louis Rhead for an edition of Charles and Mary Lamb's Tales from Shakespeare (1918).

Snug is a minor character in the play. He is a joiner from Athens who is assigned by Peter Quince to play the part of the lion in Pyramus and Thisbe. When he is first assigned the part, he is afraid it may take him a while to finally remember his lines (even though the lion's role was nothing but roaring originally). Bottom offers to play the part of the lion (as he offers to play all other parts), but he is rejected by Quince, who worries (as do the other characters) that his loud and ferocious roar in the play will frighten the ladies of power in the audience and get Quince and all his actors hanged. In the end, the lion's part is revised to explain that he is in fact not a lion and means the audience no harm.

Snug is often played as a stupid man, a manner describing almost all of the Mechanicals.

Snug is the only Mechanical to whom the playwright did not assign a first name.

In Jean-Louis and Jules Supervielle's French adaptation, Le Songe d'une nuit d'été (1959), Snug is renamed to Gatebois, where Georges Neveux's 1945 adaptation used the English names.

On the Elizabethan stage, the role of Snug and the other Mechanicals was intended to be doubled with Titania's four fairy escorts: Mote, Mustardseed, Cobweb, and Peaseblossom.

== Nick Bottom ==
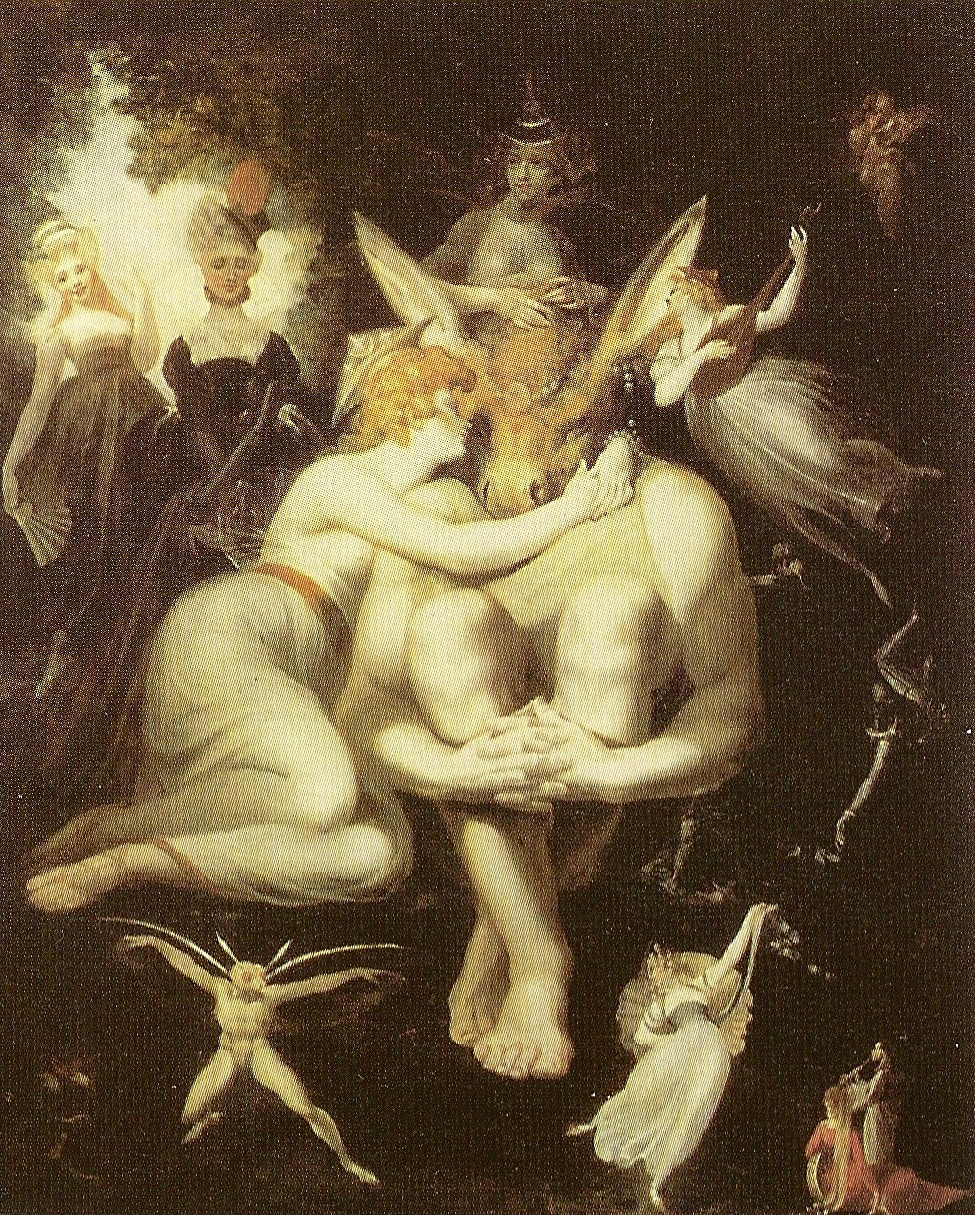
Titania adoring the Ass-headed Bottom. Oil on canvas by Henry Fuseli, c. 1790

Nick Bottom provides comic relief throughout the play. A weaver by trade, he is famously known for getting his head transformed into that of a donkey by the elusive Puck. Bottom and Puck are the only two characters who converse with and progress the three central stories in the whole play. Puck is first introduced in the fairies' story and creates the drama of the lovers' story by messing up who loves whom, and places the donkey head on Bottom's in his story. Similarly, Bottom is performing in a play in his story intending it to be presented in the lovers' story, as well as interacting with Titania in the fairies' story.

== Francis Flute ==
Francis Flute's occupation is a bellows-mender. He is forced to play the female role of Thisbe in "Pyramus and Thisbe", a play-within-the-play which is performed for Theseus' marriage celebration.

In the play, Flute (Thisbe) speaks through the wall (played by Tom Snout) to Pyramus (Nick Bottom).

Flute is a young, excited actor who is disappointed when he finds he is meant to play a woman (Thisbe) in their interlude before the duke and the duchess.

Flute's name, like that of the other mechanicals, is metonymical and derives from his craft: "Flute" references a church organ, an instrument prominently featuring the bellows a bellows-mender might be called upon to repair.

In Jean-Louis and Jules Supervielle's French adaptation, Le Songe d'une nuit d'été (1959), Flute is renamed to Tubulure, where Georges Neveux's 1945 adaptation used the English names.

On the Elizabethan stage, the role of Flute and the other Mechanicals was intended to be doubled with Titania's four fairy escorts: Moth (also spelled Mote), Mustardseed, Cobweb, and Peaseblossom.

== Tom Snout ==
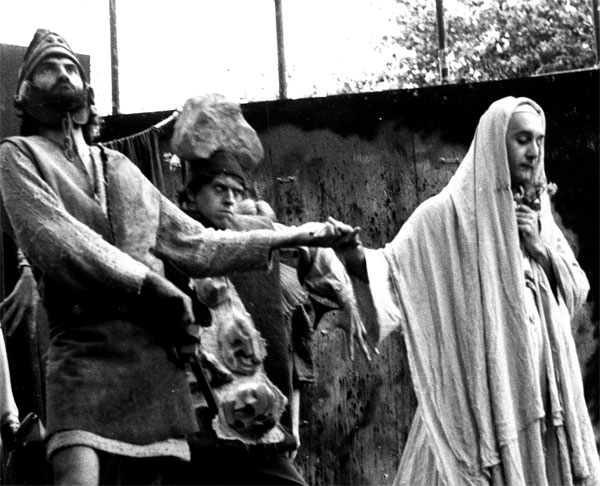
Nick Bottom (left), Francis Flute (right), and Tom Snout (background) playing Pyramus, Thisbe, and Wall in a 1978 Riverside Shakespeare Company production

Tom Snout is a tinker, and one of the Mechanicals of Athens.

In the play-within-a-play, Tom Snout plays the wall which separates Pyramus' and Thisbe's gardens. In Pyramus and Thisbe, the two lovers whisper to each other through Snout's fingers (representing a chink in the wall). Snout has eight lines under the name of Tom Snout, and two lines as The Wall. He is the Wall for Act V-Scene 1.

Tom Snout was originally set to play Pyramus's father, but the need for a wall was greater, so he discharged The Wall. Snout is often portrayed as a reluctant actor and very frightened, but the other mechanicals (except Bottom and Quince) are usually much more frightened than Tom Snout.

Snout's name, like that of the other mechanicals, is metonymical and derives from his craft: "Snout" means a nozzle or a spout, a feature of the kettles a tinker often mends.

== Robin Starveling ==
Robin Starveling plays the part of Moonshine in their performance of Pyramus and Thisbe. His part is often considered one of the more humorous in the play, as he uses a lantern in a failed attempt to portray Moonshine and is wittily derided by his audience. His real job is as a tailor.

== In popular culture ==
In Something Rotten!, Nick Bottom is a struggling playwright who leads an acting troupe. The other members of the troupe do not have names in the original show, but in the Broadway Junior adaptation there are five members who have the same names as the Mechanicals (apart from Nick).

== Sources ==
- Blits, Jan H. (2003). The Soul of Athens: Shakespeare's A Midsummer Night's Dream. Lexington Books. ISBN 9780739106532.
- Shakespeare, William (1979). Brooks, Harold (ed.). A Midsummer Night's Dream. The Arden Shakespeare, second series. London, UK: Bloomsbury Publishing. doi:10.5040/9781408188095.00000022. ISBN 9781408188095 – via Drama Online Library.
- Leach, Robert (2008). Theatre Studies: The basics. Routledge.
- Montrose, Louis Adrian (1996). The Purpose of Playing: Shakespeare and the cultural politics of the Elizabethan theatre. University of Chicago Press.
- Weiner, Andrew D. (1971). "Multiformitie uniforme: A Midsummer Night's Dream". ELH. 38 (3). The Johns Hopkins University Press: 329–349. doi:10.2307/2872222. eISSN 1080-6547. ISSN 0013-8304. JSTOR 2872222.
- Wells, Stanley W. (1990). Shakespeare and the Elizabethans. Cambridge, UK: Cambridge University Press.
- White, Kenneth S. (1960). "Two French versions of A Midsummer Night's Dream". The French Review. 33 (4). American Association of Teachers of French: 341–350. ISSN 0016-111X. JSTOR 383649.
