= Peter Quince at the Clavier =

Poem by Wallace Stevens

"Peter Quince at the Clavier" is a poem from Wallace Stevens's first book of poetry, Harmonium. The poem was first published in 1915 in the "little magazine" Others: A Magazine of the New Verse (New York), edited by Alfred Kreymborg.

Peter Quince at the Clavier

I

Just as my fingers on these keys
Make music, so the self-same sounds
On my spirit make a music, too.

Music is feeling, then, not sound;
And thus it is that what I feel,
Here in this room, desiring you,

Thinking of your blue-shadowed silk,
Is music. It is like the strain
Waked in the elders by Susanna:

Of a green evening, clear and warm,
She bathed in her still garden, while
The red-eyed elders, watching, felt

The basses of their beings throb
In witching chords, and their thin blood
Pulse pizzicati of Hosanna.

II

In the green water, clear and warm,
Susanna lay.
She searched
The touch of springs,
And found
Concealed imaginings.
She sighed,
For so much melody.

Upon the bank, she stood
In the cool
Of spent emotions.
She felt, among the leaves,
The dew
Of old devotions.

She walked upon the grass,
Still quavering.
The winds were like her maids,
On timid feet,
Fetching her woven scarves,
Yet wavering.

A breath upon her hand
Muted the night.
She turned--
A cymbal crashed,
And roaring horns.

III

Soon, with a noise like tambourines,
Came her attendant Byzantines.

They wondered why Susanna cried
Against the elders by her side;

And as they whispered, the refrain
Was like a willow swept by rain.

Anon, their lamps' uplifted flame
Revealed Susanna and her shame.

And then, the simpering Byzantines,
Fled, with a noise like tambourines.

IV

Beauty is momentary in the mind —
The fitful tracing of a portal;
But in the flesh it is immortal.

The body dies; the body's beauty lives,
So evenings die, in their green going,
A wave, interminably flowing.
So gardens die, their meek breath scenting
The cowl of Winter, done repenting.
So maidens die, to the auroral
Celebration of a maiden's choral.

Susanna's music touched the bawdy strings
Of those white elders; but, escaping,
Left only Death's ironic scrapings.

Now, in its immortality, it plays
On the clear viol of her memory,
And makes a constant sacrament of praise.

Peter Quince at the Clavier
A poem from the Harmonium collection

It is a "musical" allusion to the apocryphal story of Susanna, a beautiful young wife, bathing, spied upon and desired by the elders. The Peter Quince of the title is the character of one of the "mechanicals" in Shakespeare's A Midsummer Night's Dream. Stevens' poem titles are not necessarily a reliable indicator of the meaning of his poems, but Milton Bates suggests that it serves as ironic stage direction, the image of "Shakespear's rude mechanical pressing the delicate keyboard with his thick fingers" expressing the poet's self-deprecation and betraying Stevens's discomfort with the role of "serious poet" in those early years.

The poem is very sensual—Mark Halliday calls it Stevens' "most convincing expression of sexual desire". (Honorable mention might go to "Cy Est Pourtraicte, Madame Ste Ursule, et Les Unze Mille Vierges".) But "Peter Quince" has dimensions beyond Susanna's ablutions and the elders' desire.

For instance, the poem's Part IV contains a stunning inversion of Platonism and related theories about universals, such as the universal (property, feature) beauty. Instead of saying that beauty is an abstract unchanging Platonic Form existing perfectly in a world separate from the five senses, or an abstract unchanging concept in the mind, the poem says that, paradoxically, "Beauty is momentary in the mind": only transient beauty in the flesh is immortal. Kessler notes that "Unlike Plato or Kant, Stevens strives to unite idea and image."

Robert Buttel observes that each of the four sections has its "appropriate rhythms and tonalities", reading the poem as "part of the general movement to bring music and poetry closer together". He describes Stevens as "the musical imagist" and credits the musical architecture with organically unifying the poem. Some don't like it. For the New York Times poetry critic writing in 1931, it is a specimen of the "pure poetry" of the age that "cannot endure" because it is a "stunt" in the fantastic and the bizarre.

"Turning of music into words, and words into music, continues throughout the poem," according to Janet Mcann, "becoming metaphor as well as genuine verbal music." She instances the line "Pulse pizzicati of Hosanna" as mimicking the plucking of strings as well as suggesting the sexual itch. Because music is feeling, not sound, the analogy between music and poetry is tight. Poetry is feeling too.

Other commentators bring out Stevens' use of color images: "blue-shadowed silk", "green evening", "in the green water", even the "red-eyed elders". This is a reminder that he insisted also on the analogy between poetry and painting. In The Necessary Angel Stevens speaks of identity rather than analogy: "...it is the identity of poetry revealed as between poetry in words and poetry in paint."

Eugene Nassar explores a more abstract reading (and a more contentious one), according to which the poem is about the poet's "imaginative faculty", and Susanna represents the poem and the creative process of writing it. Laurence Perrine objects that Nassar's reading does violence to the poem and the story it leans on, naively ignoring Stevens" own "violence" in yoking a character from A Midsummer Night's Dream named in the title with a biblical narrative alluded to in The Merchant of Venice. The greatest "violence" that Stevens' poem does, though, is to Susanna's biblical reputation for righteousness.

== Adaptations ==
With all its innate musicality, it is not surprising that the poem has been adapted for music twice. Dominick Argento set it as a "Sonatina for Mixed Chorus and Piano Concertante (1979)," and Gerald Berg set it for bass voice, clarinets, percussion and piano. Both works have been recorded.
