= Helena (A Midsummer Night's Dream) =

Character in A Midsummer Night's Dream

- A Midsummer Night's Dream character
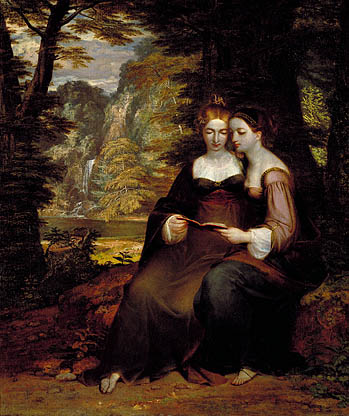
- Washington Allston's 1818 painting Hermia and Helena.
- Created by: William Shakespeare

Helena is one of four young lovers – the others being Demetrius, Lysander, and Hermia – featured in William Shakespeare's play A Midsummer Night's Dream.

== Role in A Midsummer Night's Dream ==
Helena, the daughter of Nedar, is the lifelong friend of Hermia (to whom she often compares herself). Before the events of the play, Helena was betrothed to the nobleman Demetrius, but she was rejected when his affections turned to Hermia. Despite this, Helena maintained an abiding love for Demetrius. Hermia confides in Helena that she plans to elope with a man called Lysander. Helena tells Demetrius of Hermia and Lysander's plans and, together, they follow the eloping lovers.

Though Demetrius is deliberately cruel towards her, Helena remains devoted to him. Her devotion catches the attention of Oberon, the king of the fairies. Oberon commands a spirit, Puck, to enchant Demetrius into falling back in love with Helena. When Puck mistakenly enchants a sleeping Lysander instead, Lysander wakes and falls instantly in love with Helena. He pursues a shocked and hurt Helena, deserting a sleeping Hermia. Oberon, trying to correct Puck's error, enchants Demetrius, who also falls in love with Helena. In the denouement, Helena and Hermia nearly come to blows while Lysander and Demetrius fight over who is more worthy of Helena's affections.

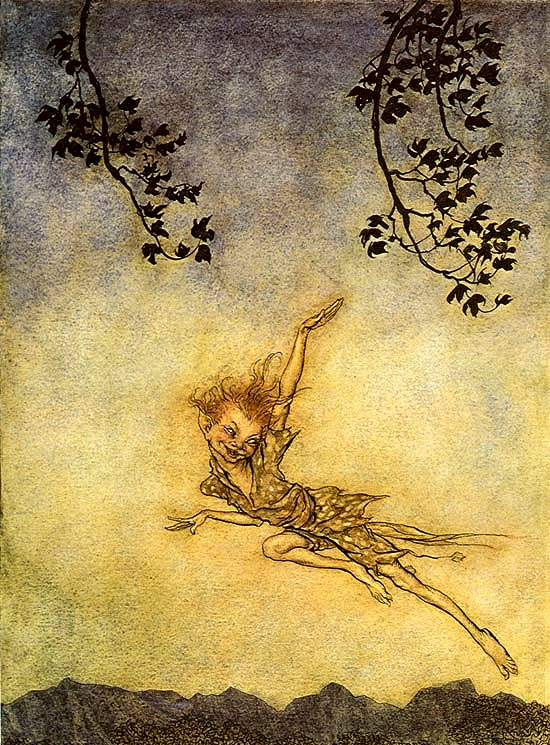
Puck by Rackham

Oberon commands Puck to fix the enchantment mistakenly placed upon Lysander. With dawn approaching, the lovers each go to sleep again, and Puck reverses the enchantment he put upon Lysander. By the time the lovers are discovered in the morning by a hunting Theseus, Hippolyta, and Egeus, all has been put right. Demetrius claims that a metaphorical 'sickness' made him love Hermia, but in health, his love has returned to Helena. The lovers are married in a joint ceremony with Theseus and Hippolyta, and together watch the play put on by the Mechanicals in their honour.

While not the only protagonist of A Midsummer Night's Dream, Helena is one of its most talkative characters. Her dialogue presents a humanist belief in the nature of love and the process of falling in love. She is also the catalyst of the play's drama, as Oberon (in his role as a deus ex machina) is moved to action by her situation.

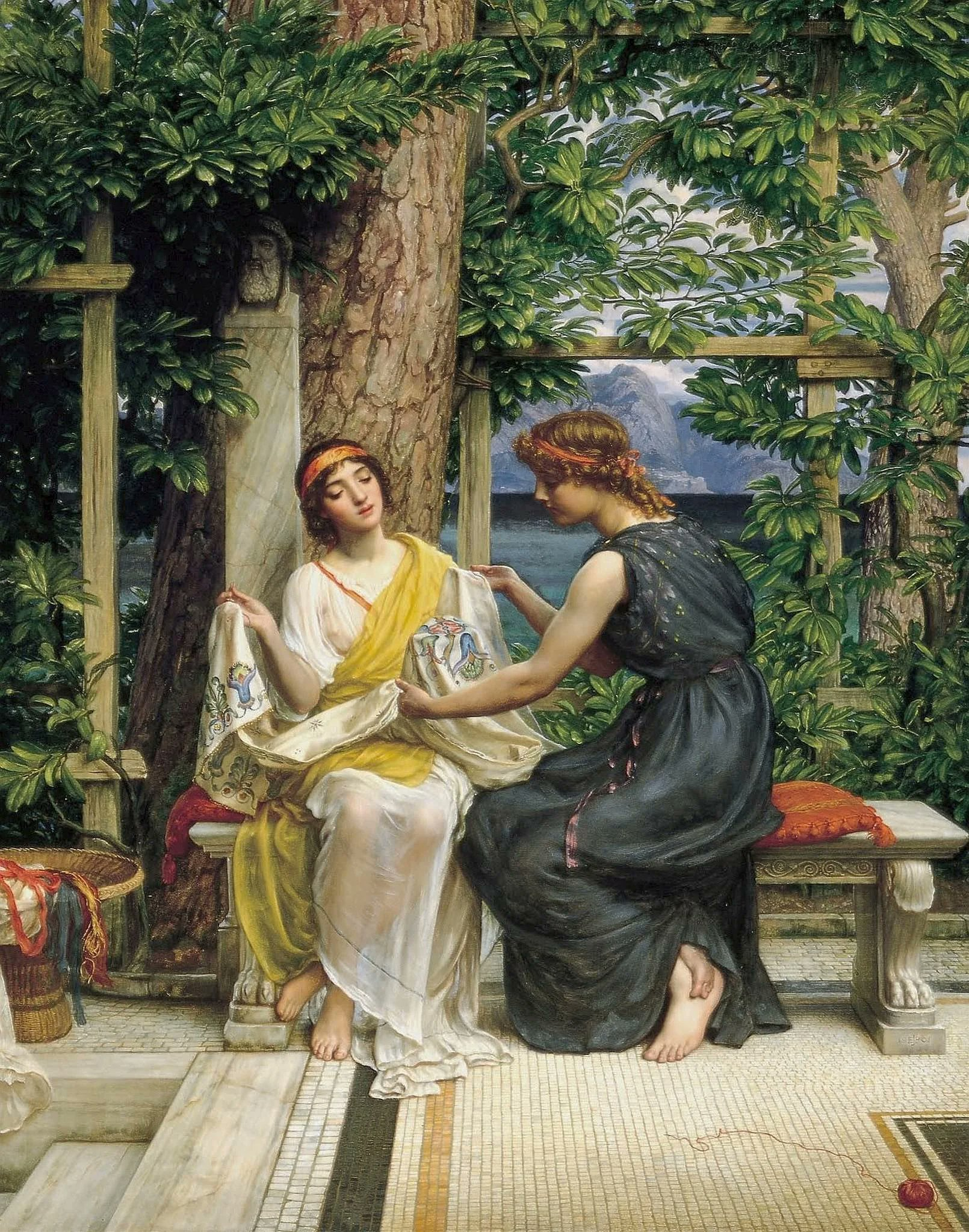
Helena and Hermia, 1901 by Edward Poynter

Helena is never criticized for her unrequited love for Demetrius; her constancy is seen by other characters as a great virtue, compared to their fickle nature. She also demonstrates great platonic love and sisterly devotion to Hermia. Within the cast of the lovers, her role is comparable to Lysander's. Both are more outwardly romantic and thoughtful than their partners, and both speak those lines most pertinent to the play's themes of romantic maturity and the source of lasting love. While Lysander says, "the course of true love ne'er did run smooth," Helena's speech in Act I includes the well-known quote: "Love looks not with the eyes, but with the mind; And therefore, is wing'd Cupid painted blind."

Her name is reminiscent of Helen of Troy, a reference made by Theseus towards the play's end. Her character is similar to that of Shakespeare's Helena in All's Well That Ends Well.

== Portrayals ==
- In the 1925 silent film Wood Love, Helena is portrayed by Barbara von Annenkoff.
- In the 1935 film, Helena is portrayed by Jean Muir.
- In the 1968 film, Helena is portrayed by Diana Rigg.
- In the 1969 film, Helena is portrayed by Claude Jade.
- In the 1981 BBC Television Shakespeare production, produced by Jonathan Miller, Helena was portrayed by Lynn Redgrave.
- In the 1996 film directed by Adrian Noble, Helena is portrayed by Emily Raymond.
- In the 1999 film, Helena is portrayed by Calista Flockhart.
- In another 1999 film directed by James Kerwin, Helena is portrayed by Regan Kerwin.
- In the 2002 film A Midsummer Night's Rave, the character Elena, who is portrayed by Lauren German, corresponds to Helena.
- In the 2012 Indian romcom film 10ml Love by Sharat Katariya, the character Minnie, who is portrayed by Koel Purie, corresponds to Helena.
- In Emma Rice's 2016 production at Shakespeare's Globe in London, the gay hero Helenus was played by Ankur Bahl.
