= Peter Quince =

Character in A Midsummer Night's dream

Peter Quince is a character in William Shakespeare's A Midsummer Night's Dream. He is one of the six mechanicals of Athens who perform the play which Quince himself authored, "The Most Lamentable Comedy and Most Cruel Death of Pyramus and Thisbe" for the Duke Theseus and his wife Hippolyta at their wedding. Titania's Fairies also watch from a distance: Moth, Peaseblossom, Cobweb and Mustardseed. His name is derived from "quines" or "quoins", which are interlocked oversized corner blocks used by masons to add extra strength at corners and edges of stone walls.

== Characterization ==
Quince's amateurish playwriting is usually taken to be a parody of the popular mystery plays of the pre-Elizabethan era, which were also produced by craftspeople. His metrical preferences refer to vernacular ballads. Despite Quince's obvious shortcomings as a writer, Stanley Wells argues that he partly resembles Shakespeare himself. Both are from a craftsmanly background, both work quickly and both take secondary roles in their own plays. Robert Leach makes the same point.

In performing the play Quince recites the prologue but struggles to fit his lines into the meter and make the rhymes. The noble audience makes jocular comments, whilst the rest of the mechanicals struggle (except for Bottom, who rather confidently improvises).

Traditionally, Peter Quince is portrayed as a bookish character, caught up in the minute details of his play, but as a theatrical organizer. However, in the 1999 film version of A Midsummer Night's Dream, he is portrayed by Roger Rees as a strong character extremely capable of being a director. It is he who leads the search party looking for Nick Bottom in the middle of the play.

== Cultural references ==
The character is named in the title of a Wallace Stevens poem, "Peter Quince at the Clavier", which is written in the first person as if spoken by Quince.

Peter Quince is mentioned in Johann von Goethe's Faust (Part II, Act IV).

Peter Quince is a major character and antagonist in the 2019 video game Elsinore, alongside characters mostly taken from William Shakespeare's Hamlet.

A minor character in the 2015 Shakespeare-based musical comedy Something Rotten! is named after Peter Quince.

== Bibliography ==
- Bates, Milton J. (1985). Wallace Stevens: a mythology of self. University of California Press.
- Montrose, Louis Adrian (1996). The Purpose of Playing: Shakespeare and The Cultural Politics of The Elizabethan Theatre. University of Chicago Press.
- Wells, Stanley W. (1990). Shakespeare and the Elizabethans. Cambridge: Cambridge University Press.
- Leach, Robert (2008). Theatre Studies: The Basics. Routledge.
