= American Association of Teachers of French =

American teachers' association

The American Association of Teachers of French (AATF) is a professional organization for teachers of French in the United States founded in 1927. Teachers who join this association may be involved in primary, secondary, or university-level French education. Additionally, retired and student teachers are also welcome. Currently there are about 10,000 members. As the interest in French has declined in the United States since the 1980s, the organization has held annual conventions to bring together teachers and educators to find ways to promote French outside the traditional curriculum.

The AATF's official publication is called The French Review, which has the largest circulation of any scholarly journal on the French language. Carine Bourget, Professor of French and Francophone Studies at the University of Arizona, is its editor in chief. Michel Gueldry of Missouri Science and Technology is the current managing editor.

== National French Contest ==
The National French Contest was established in 1936 by the Executive Council of AATF to help determine the relative student achievement in the learning of French in the United States. Originally the contest was called Le Grand Concours National de Français but was later shortened to Le Grand Concours.

The annual contest currently has around 100,000 participants from elementary schools to high schools in all chapters nationwide. There are seven levels. The first level called FLES is for elementary school students. Levels 01, and 1 to 5 are for grades 7 to 12. In each level, there are divisions A to E to separate students based on prior exposure to French. About 0.1% of all participants receive gold medals for National Rank 1. About 0.7% receive silver medals for National Ranks 2 to 3. About 8% receive bronze medals for National Ranks 4 to 10.

== See also ==
- American Council on the Teaching of Foreign Languages
- American Association of Teachers of German
