= Jan Blits =

American academic

Jan H. Blits
- Born: April 6, 1943 (age 82)
- Education: St. John's College, New School for Social Research
- Awards: Lynde and Harry Bradley Foundation's Jeane Kirkpatrick Academic Freedom Award (2011)
- Scientific career
- Fields: Education
- Institutions: University of Delaware
- Thesis: All the sway of earth: the politics of Shakespeare's Julius Caesar (1975)

Jan H. Blits (born April 6, 1943) is an American educational researcher and professor emeritus in the University of Delaware School of Education. He is also the president of the Delaware chapter of the National Association of Scholars (NAS). He received the Prometheus Award from the Foundation for Individual Rights in Education in 2009, and the Jeane Kirkpatrick Academic Freedom Award from the Lynde and Harry Bradley Foundation in 2011. Along with his colleague Linda Gottfredson he helped to shut down a Residence Life Program at the University of Delaware in 2007, which the NAS had described as an "indoctrination center". Blits also worked with Gottfredson during the university's attempts to prevent them from receiving research funding from the eugenics-related Pioneer Fund in the early 1990s. Blits and Gottfredson succeeded, and were allowed to accept funds from the organization.
