= Titania (A Midsummer Night's Dream) =

Character in Shakespeare's play

- A Midsummer Night's Dream character
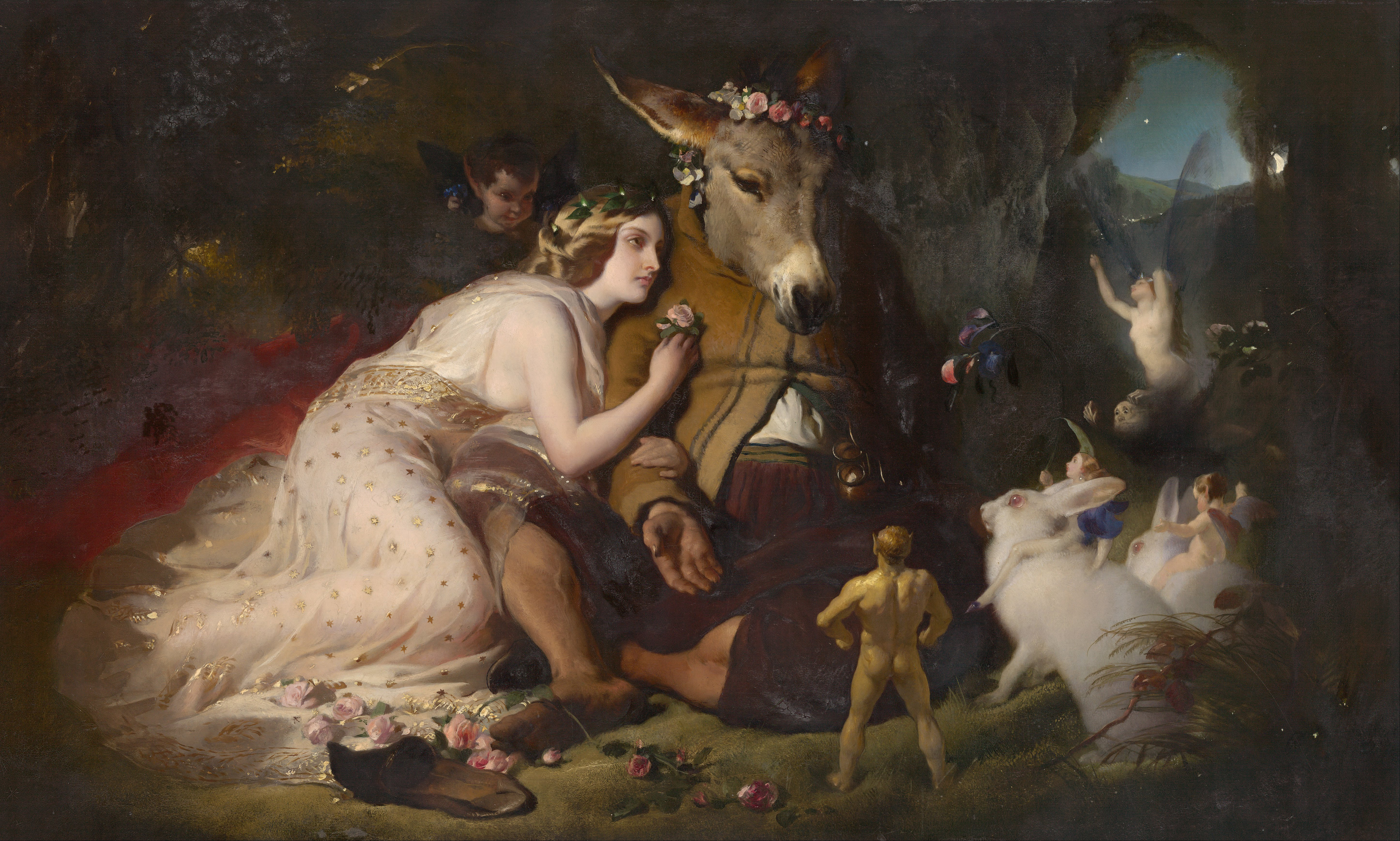
- Titania, Bottom and fairies in Scene from A Midsummer Night's Dream, painted by Edwin Landseer
- First appearance: c.1595
- Created by: William Shakespeare

In-universe information
- Spouse: Oberon

Titania (/tɪˈtɑːniə/) is a character in William Shakespeare's 1595–1596 play A Midsummer Night's Dream.

In the play, she is the Queen of the fairies and wife of the Fairy King, Oberon. The pair are depicted as powerful natural spirits who together guarantee the fertility or health of the human and natural worlds. Yet their falling out has severely disrupted both worlds, as Titania explains at length in Act 2 Scene 1, ending "And this same progeny of evils comes From our debate, from our dissension."

== Origins ==
The names Titania and Oberon may both sound vaguely classical, but neither is a figure from classical mythology. Survivals of homegrown English paganism were sometimes denounced as witchcraft; but Shakespeare folds his pagan fairies into the more accepted mythology of Greco-Roman literature, associating Titania and Oberon with the legend of Theseus.

Shakespeare likely took the name Titania from Ovid's Metamorphoses, where it is an appellation given to the daughters of Titans. In traditional folklore, the fairy queen has no name. Due to Shakespeare's influence, later fiction has often used the name Titania for fairy-queen characters.

== Role in the play ==
Shakespeare's Titania has a major role to play in one of A Midsummer Night's Dream's subplots.

Titania is a proud creature and as much of a force to contend with as her husband, Oberon. She and Oberon are engaged in a marital quarrel over which of them should have the keeping of an Indian changeling boy. It is this quarrel which drives the plot, creating the mix-ups and confusion of the other characters in the play.

Due to an enchantment cast by Oberon's servant Puck, Titania magically falls in love with a "rude mechanical" (a labourer), Nick Bottom the weaver, who has been given the head of a donkey by Puck, who feels it is better suited to his character. While under the spell, Titania loses the powerful attributes she previously held and becomes fawning instead.

After Oberon and Puck have had enough of watching Titania make a fool of herself to woo "a monster", Oberon reverses the spell and the two reunite after Titania pronounces "what visions have I seen! Methought I was enamour'd of an ass." At the play's conclusion, Titania and Oberon lead a fairy blessing of the marriages of the play's protagonists.

== Analysis ==
Paul A. Olson argues that Titania falling in love with Bottom is an inversion of the ancient Circe story from Greek mythology. In this case, the tables are turned on the character and rather than the sorceress turning her lovers into animals, she is made to love a donkey after Bottom has been transformed.

== Legacy ==
Titania has appeared in many other paintings, poems, plays and other works. In perhaps the earliest citation, Johann Wolfgang von Goethe included the figures from Shakespeare's work in Faust I in the 1770s, where she and her husband are celebrating their golden wedding anniversary.

Carl Maria von Weber then used the characters of Titania, Oberon and Puck in his opera with spoken dialogue composed in 1825–26, Oberon, but this time set during the reign of Charlemagne.

Alfred, Lord Tennyson's 1892 play The Foresters, a Robin Hood story, includes a brief segment with Titania, Queen of the Fairies.

Titania, one of Uranus's moons, was named after Shakespeare's character. All of its moons (including Oberon) are named for characters from the works of William Shakespeare or Alexander Pope.

Titania also appears in the cartoon Gargoyles, produced by Walt Disney Television Animation, which originally aired from October 24, 1994, to February 15, 1997. Oberon and Titania have been divorced for 1,001 years, but remarry during the course of the series. She is also revealed to be the true identity of Anastasia Renard, mother of the recurring antagonist Fox. Titania/Anastasia is voiced by Kate Mulgrew.

In the 1999 film adaptation of the play, Titania is played by Michelle Pfeiffer.

In 2016 Titania was added to the free-to-play action role-playing third-person shooter online game Warframe as the namesake of one of the titular Warframes, featuring razor-butterflies and assorted fairy-themed abilities.

In the manga and anime The Ancient Magus' Bride (魔法使いの嫁 Mahō Tsukai no Yome), which aired from October 2017 to March 2018, the Queen of the Fairies is named Titania. Her husband is also named Oberon.

In the manga and anime Fairy Tail, which was serialised from August 2006 to July 2017 and broadcast as a series from 2009 to 2019, the character Erza Scarlet carries the title of "Titania, Queen of the Fairies" because of her status as one of the most powerful of the female wizards in the Fairy Tail guild.

In the light novel and anime Sword Art Online, Asuna is forced to assume the role of "Fairy Queen Titania" in the series' "Fairy Dance" arc.

In the 2016 BBC adaptation for television, Titania is played by Maxine Peak. The version became known for the kiss between Titania and Hippolyta.

Titania is one of the bases for one of the bosses in Mega Man Zero 4, a video game which was created in 2005. The character is called Sol Titanion, alongside a butterfly.

Titania is the Queen of the Summer Court of fairies in Jim Butcher's The Dresden Files series, the first installment of which was published in 2000.

In Dark Princess by W. E. B. Du Bois, the author dedicates the book: "To Her High Loveliness Titania XXVII By Her Own Grace Queen of Faerie."

In Final Fantasy XIV: Shadowbringers, released on July 2, 2019, Titania appears as an opponent during the course of the story. In the fiction, the name "Titania" is actually a title held by the ruler of the faeries rather than being an individual name in and of itself.

Titania also appears in the Shin Megami Tensei series of video games as a recruitable Demon alongside her spouse Oberon.

In a production by the Bridge Theatre, Titania, played by Gwendoline Christie, switches roles with Oberon. For example, Titania is the one who places the love spell instead onto Oberon, who falls in love with Bottom.

In Vertigo Comics' The Sandman, which ran for 75 issues from January 1989 to March 1996, Titania rules Faerie with her mate Auberon and is a rumored one-time lover of the titular Lord of Dreams. One issue recounts that William Shakespeare created A Midsummer Night's Dream as a commission piece for Dream—who presents it to Titania as a gift to Faerie, so that the fey folk should not be forgotten in the Waking World.
