= Pyramus and Thisbe =

Pair of ill-fated lovers from Greek mythology

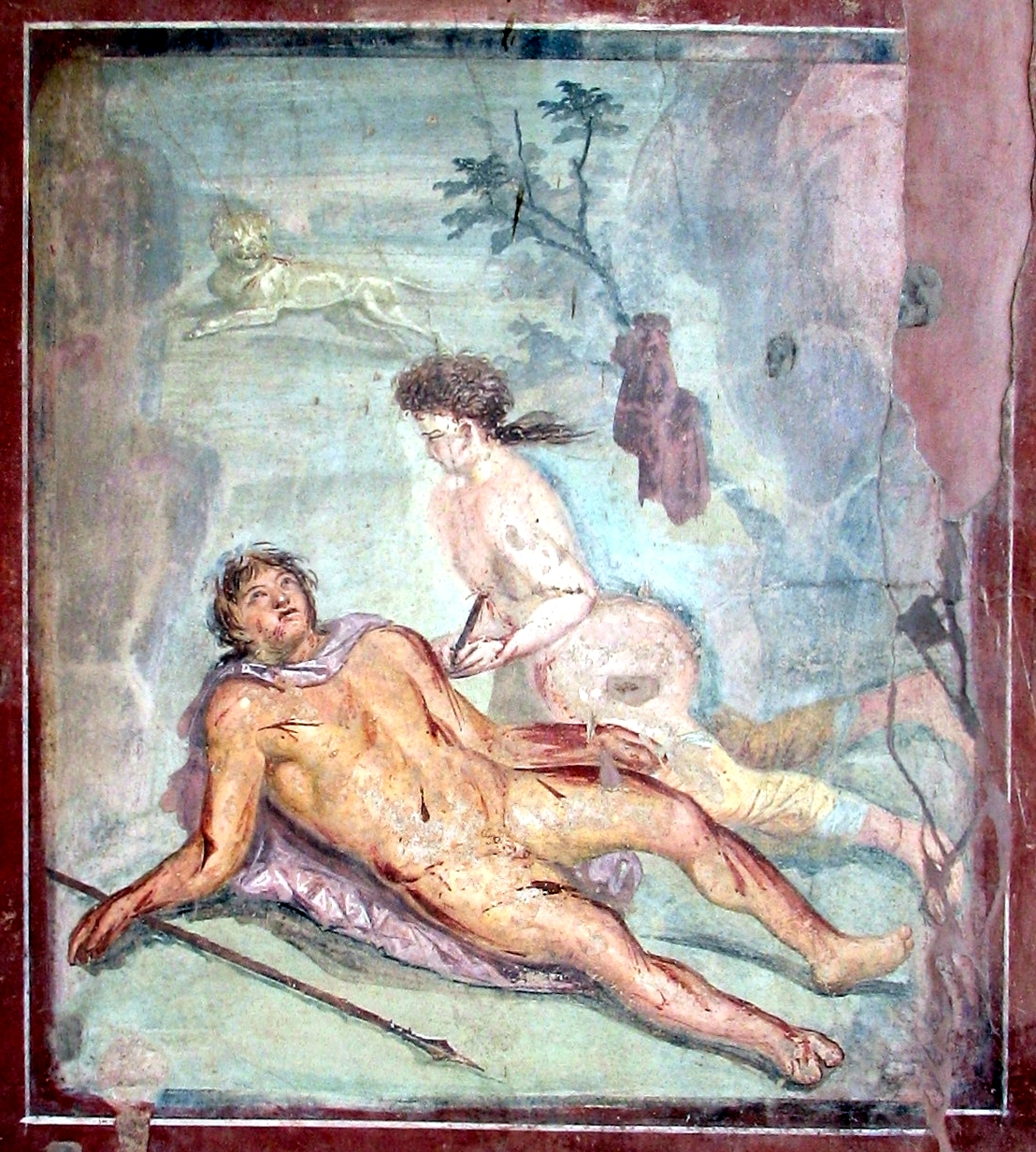
Pyramus and Thisbe from a Roman fresco in Pompeii.

In Roman mythology, Pyramus and Thisbe (Ancient Greek: Πύραμος καὶ Θίσβη, romanized: Púramos kaì Thísbē) are a pair of ill-fated lovers from Babylon, whose story is best known from Ovid's narrative poem Metamorphoses. The tragic myth has been retold by many authors.

Pyramus and Thisbe's parents, driven by rivalry, forbade their union, but they communicated through a crack in the wall between their houses. They planned to meet under a mulberry tree, but a series of tragic misunderstandings led to their deaths: Thisbe fled from a lioness, leaving her cloak behind, which Pyramus found and mistook as evidence of her death. Believing Thisbe was killed by the lioness, Pyramus died by suicide, staining the mulberry fruits with his blood. Thisbe, upon finding Pyramus dead, also killed herself. The gods changed the color of the mulberry fruits to honor their forbidden love.

Ovid's version is the oldest surviving account, but the story is likely to have originated from earlier myths in Cilicia. The tale has been adapted in various forms, inspiring works such as Shakespeare's Romeo and Juliet and A Midsummer Night's Dream, as well as modern adaptations in literature, opera, and popular culture. The story is depicted in works of art from ancient Roman mosaics to Renaissance paintings.

== Mythology ==
=== Ovid ===
Pyramus and Thisbe are two lovers in the city of Babylon who occupy connected houses. Their respective parents, driven by rivalry, forbid them to wed. Through a crack in one of the walls they whisper their love for each other. They arrange to meet near a tomb under a mulberry tree and state their feelings for each other. Thisbe arrives first, but upon seeing a lioness with a bloody mouth from a recent kill, she flees, leaving behind her cloak. When Pyramus arrives, he is horrified at the sight of Thisbe's cloak: the lioness had torn it and left traces of blood behind, as well as its tracks. Assuming that a wild beast had killed her, Pyramus kills himself, falling on his sword, a typical Babylonian way to commit suicide, and in turn splashing blood on the white mulberry leaves. Pyramus' blood stains the white mulberry fruits, turning them dark. Thisbe returns, eager to tell Pyramus what had happened to her, but she finds Pyramus' dead body under the shade of the mulberry tree. Thisbe, after praying to their parents and the gods to have them buried together and a brief period of mourning, stabs herself with the same sword. In the end, the gods listen to Thisbe's lament, and forever change the color of the mulberry fruits into the stained color to honor forbidden love. Her wish to be buried together with Pyramus is also granted; the lovers' ashes are preserved in one urn. Pyramus and Thisbe are models of love that is faithful to the very end.

=== Origins and other versions ===
Ovid's is the oldest surviving version of the story, published in 8 AD, but he adapted an existing aetiological myth. While in Ovid's telling Pyramus and Thisbe lived in Babylon, and Ctesias had placed the tomb of his imagined king Ninus near that city, the myth probably originated in Cilicia (part of Ninus' Babylonian empire) as Pyramos is the historical Greek name of the local Ceyhan River. The metamorphosis in the primary story involves Pyramus changing into this river and Thisbe into a nearby spring. A 2nd-century mosaic unearthed near Nea Paphos on Cyprus depicts this older version of the myth. This alternative version also survives in the progymnasmata, a work by Nicolaus Sophista, a Greek sophist and rhetor who lived during the fifth century AD.

Ovid's rendition of the tale seems to have been inspired by an earlier genre of Greek tragic love stories in which a woman is killed accidentally or indirectly by a man, and following that he dies or commits suicide in grief; such examples include Anthippe and Cichyrus and Cyanippus and Leucone.

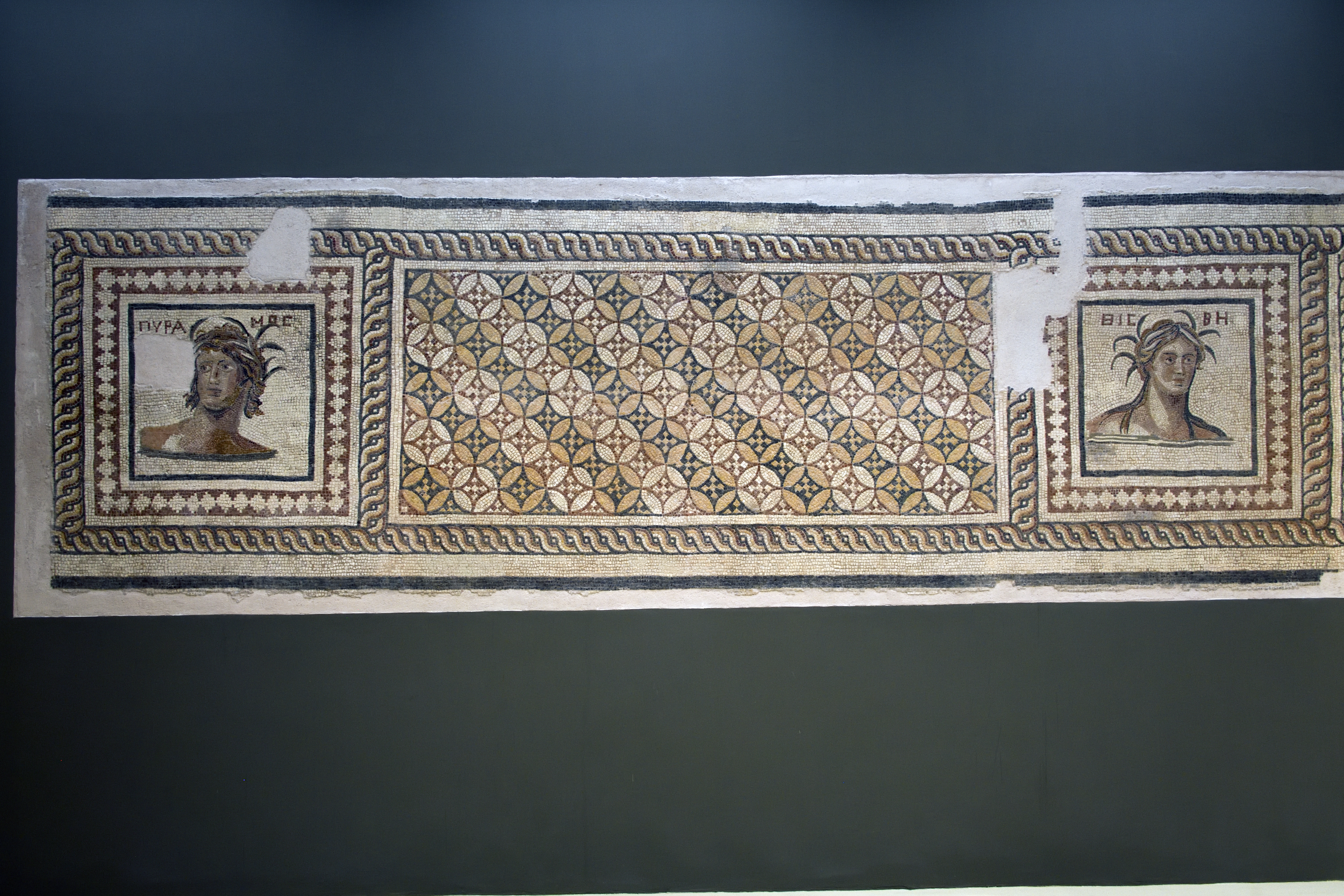
Pyramus and Thisbe depicted as fresh water deities on a Roman mosaic from Antioch.

== Adaptations ==
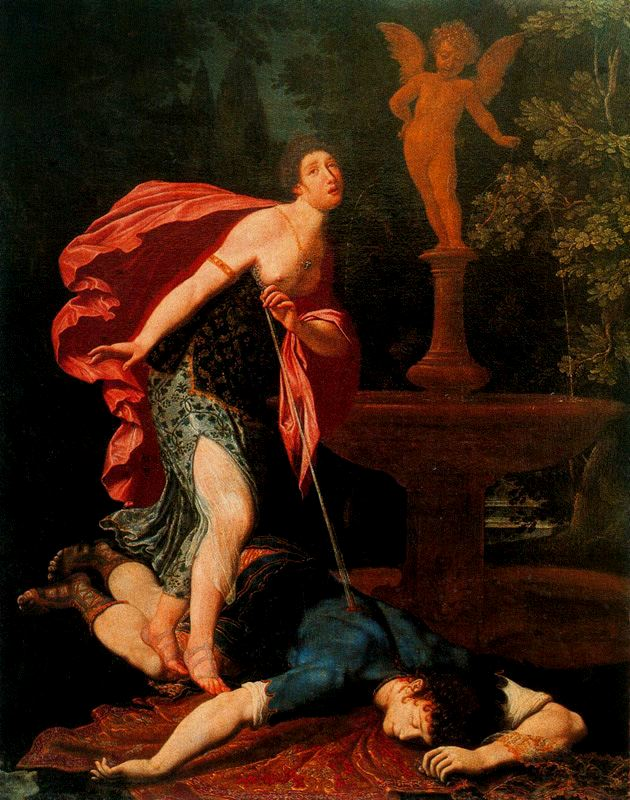
Pyramus and Thisbe by Gregorio Pagani. Uffizi Gallery.

The story of Pyramus and Thisbe appears in Giovanni Boccaccio's On Famous Women as biography number twelve (sometimes thirteen) and in his Decameron, in the fifth story on the seventh day, where a desperate housewife falls in love with her neighbor, and communicates with him through a crack in the wall, attracting his attention by dropping pieces of stone and straw through the crack.

In the 1380s, Geoffrey Chaucer, in his The Legend of Good Women, and John Gower, in his Confessio Amantis, were the first to tell the story in English. Gower altered the story somewhat into a cautionary tale. John Metham's Amoryus and Cleopes (1449) is another early English adaptation.

The tragedy of Romeo and Juliet ultimately sprang from Ovid's story. Here the star-crossed lovers cannot be together because Juliet has been engaged by her parents to another man and the two families hold an ancient grudge. As in Pyramus and Thisbe, the mistaken belief in one lover's death leads to consecutive suicides. The earliest version of Romeo and Juliet was published in 1476 by Masuccio Salernitano, while it mostly obtained its present form when written down in 1524 by Luigi da Porto. Salernitano and Da Porto both are thought to have been inspired by Ovid and Boccaccio's writing. Shakespeare's most famous 1590s adaptation is a dramatization of Arthur Brooke's 1562 poem The Tragical History of Romeus and Juliet, itself a translation of a French translation of Da Porto's novella.

In Shakespeare's A Midsummer Night's Dream (Act V, sc 1), a comedy written in the 1590s, a group of "mechanicals" enact the story of "Pyramus and Thisbe". Their production is crude and, for the most part, badly done until the final monologues of Nick Bottom, as Pyramus and Francis Flute, as Thisbe. The theme of forbidden love is also present in the main plot of A Midsummer Night's Dream (albeit in a less tragic and dark representation) in that a girl, Hermia, is not able to marry the man she loves, Lysander, because her father Egeus despises him and wishes for her to marry Demetrius, and meanwhile Hermia and Lysander are confident that Helena is in love with Demetrius.

The Beatles performed a humorous performance of "Pyramus and Thisbe" on the 1964 television special Around the Beatles. Primarily based around William Shakespeare's adaptation in A Midsummer Night's Dream, the performance featured Paul McCartney as Pyramus, John Lennon as his lover Thisbe, George Harrison as Moonshine, and Ringo Starr as Lion, with Trevor Peacock in the role of Quince.

Spanish poet Luis de Góngora wrote a Fábula de Píramo y Tisbe in 1618, while French poet Théophile de Viau wrote Les amours tragiques de Pyrame et Thisbée, a tragedy in five acts, in 1621.

In 1718 Giuseppe Antonio Brescianello wrote his only opera, La Tisbe, for Württemberg court. François Francoeur and François Rebel composed Pirame et Thisbé, a lyric tragedy in five acts and a prologue, with libretto by Jean-Louis-Ignace de La Serre; it was played at the Académie royale de musique, on October 17, 1726. The story was adapted by John Frederick Lampe as a "Mock Opera" in 1745, containing a singing "Wall" which was described as "the most musical partition that was ever heard." In 1768 in Vienna, Johann Adolph Hasse composed a serious opera on the tale, titled Piramo e Tisbe.

Edmond Rostand adapted the tale, making the fathers of the lovers conspire to bring their children together by pretending to forbid their love, in Les Romanesques, whose 1960 musical adaptation, The Fantasticks, became the world's longest-running musical.

Pyramus and Thisbe were featured in The Simpsons 2012 episode "The Daughter Also Rises". Nick and Lisa's misunderstood love was compared to Thisbe and Pyramus' forbidden love. Much like the crack in the wall, Lisa and Nick met through a crack between two booths in an Italian restaurant. Lisa and Nick are portrayed as the two characters during a later portion of the episode. They go to finish off their story and head for the tree under which Pyramus and Thisbe's fate presented itself.

Bolu Babalola adapted the story of Pyramus and Thisbe in her 2020 anthology Love in Color: Mythical Tales from Around the World, Retold. In this version Pyramus and Thisbe are college students living next door to each other in an old college dorm with a crack in the wall. Unlike in the original myth, their story ends with them happily together.

== In art ==
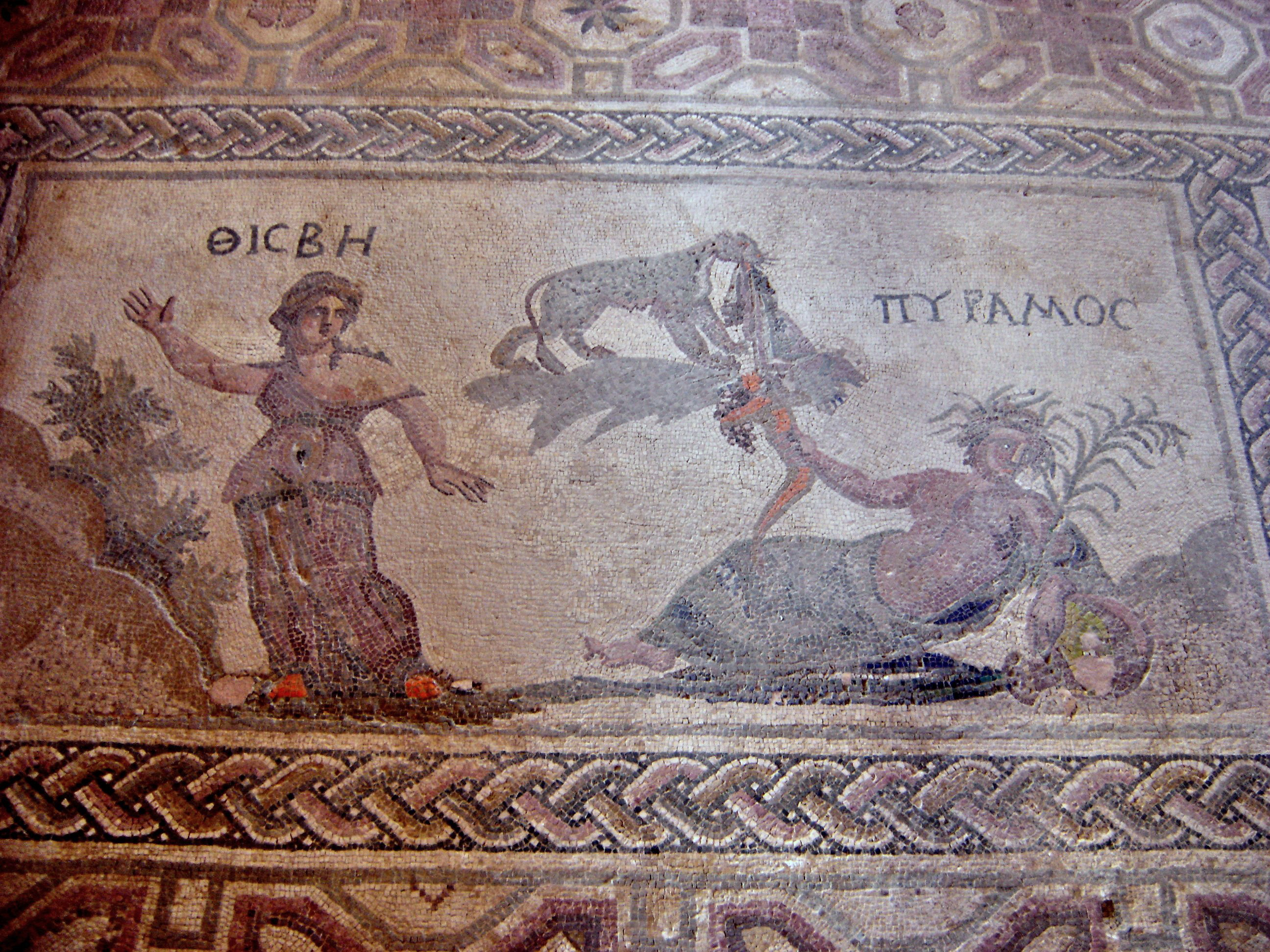
Roman mosaic at Paphos, Cyprus

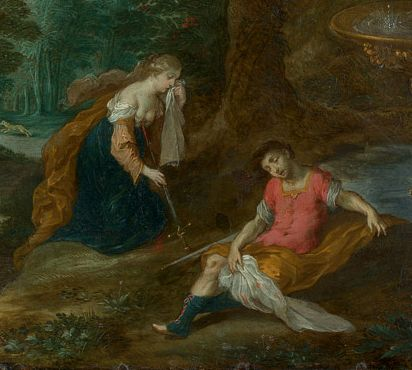
Painting attributed to Jasper van der Laanen (1585–1634)

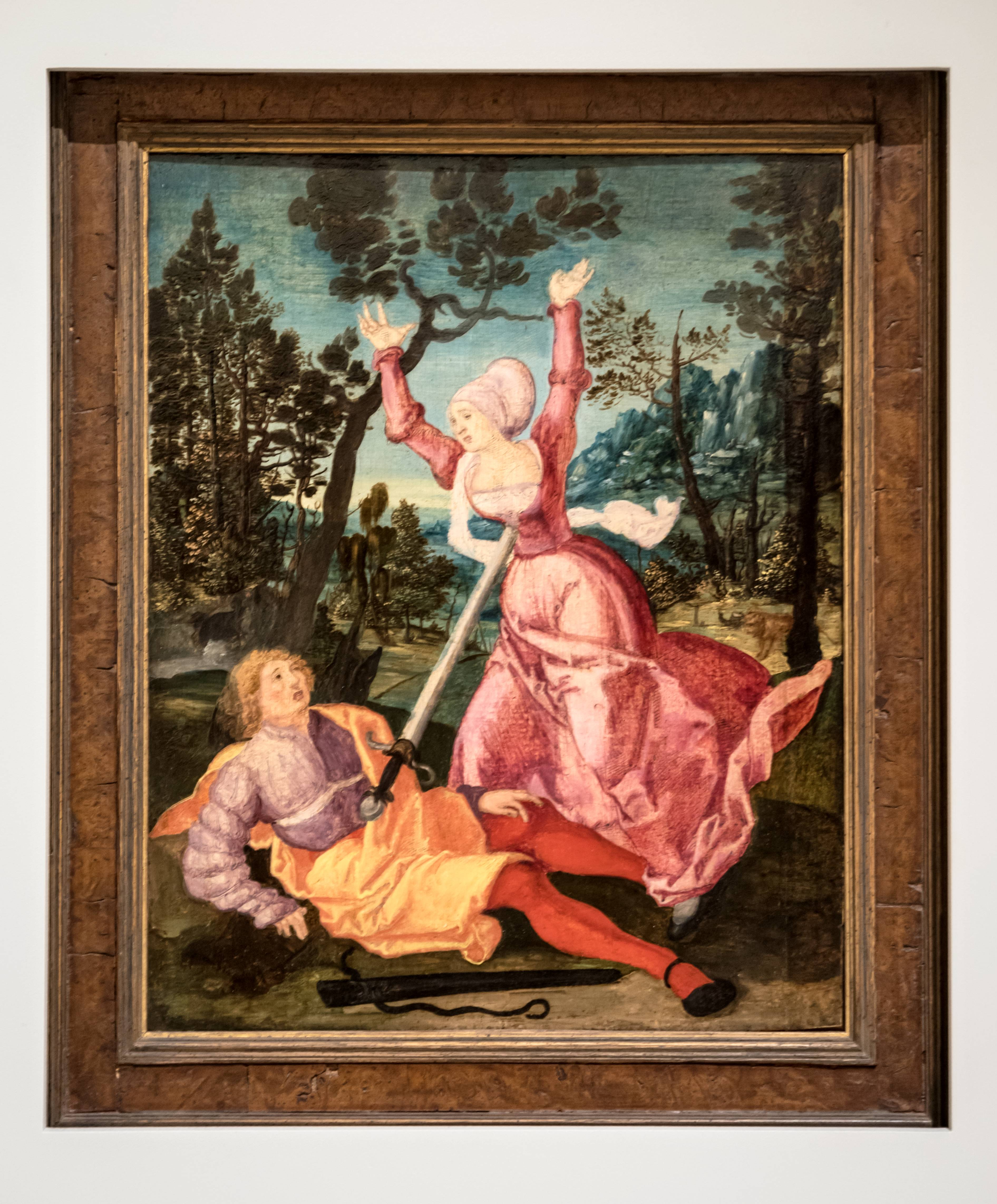
16th century, Unterlinden Museum Colmar

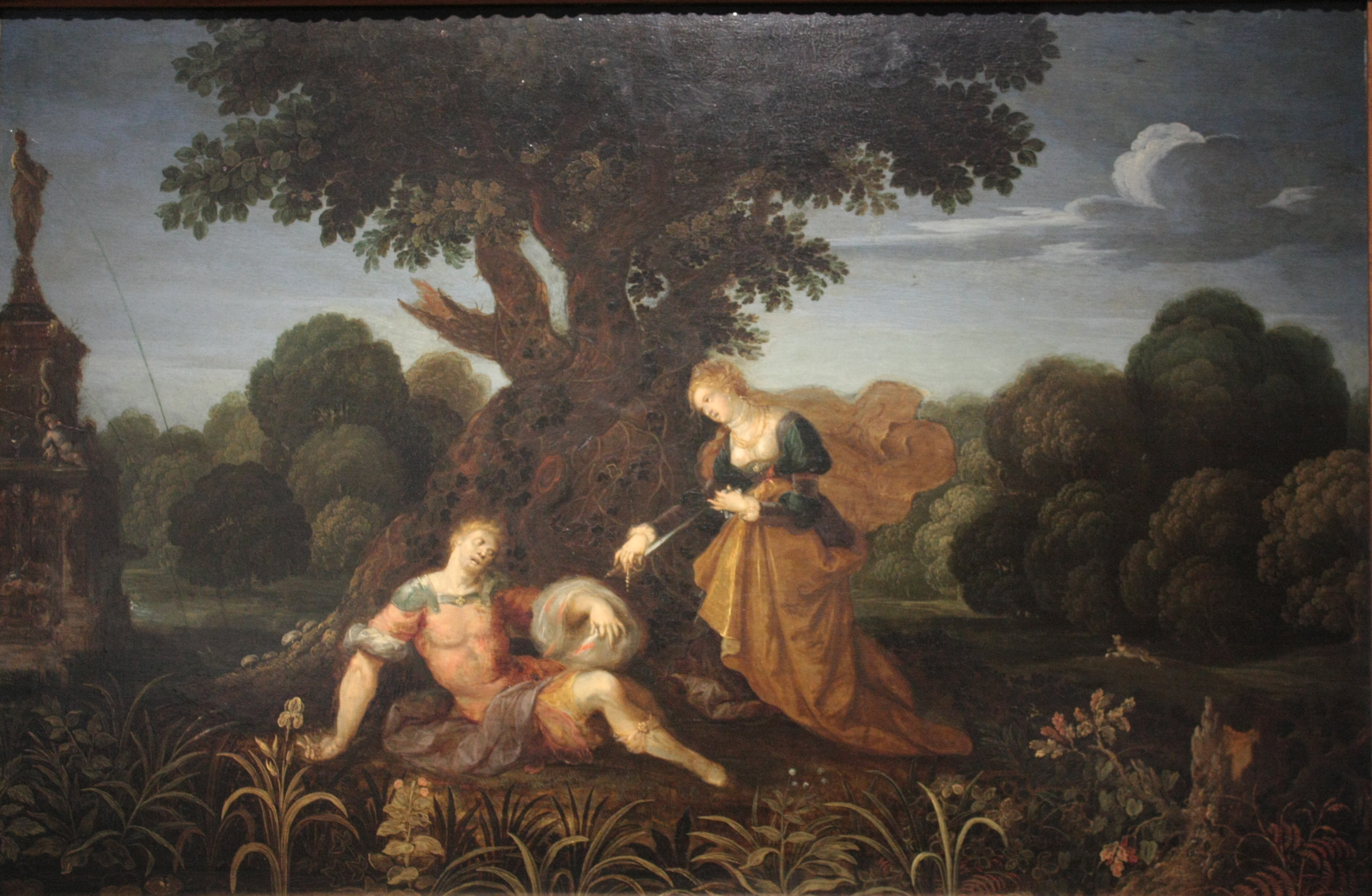
Nicolaus Knüpfer, early 17th century

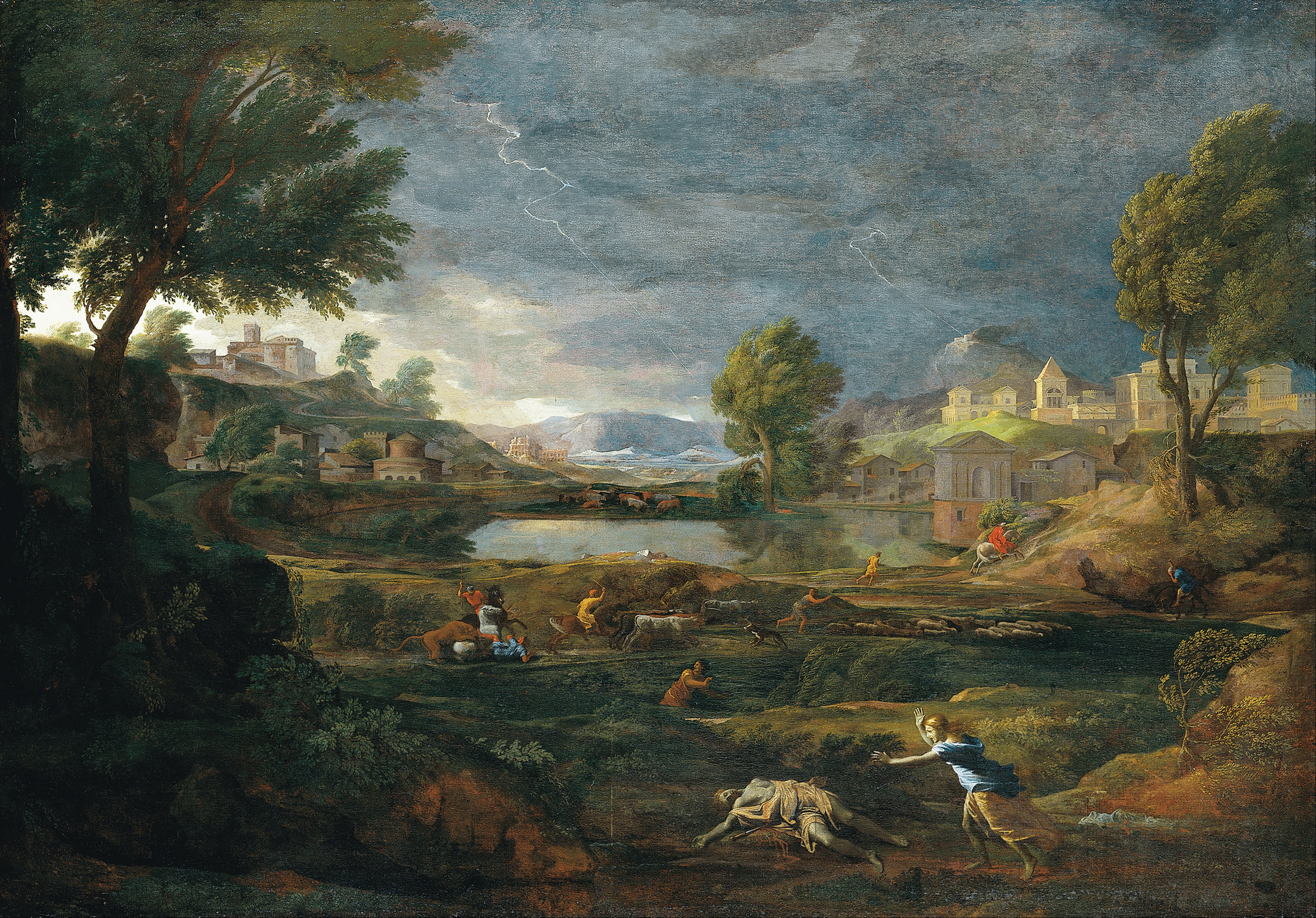
Nicholas Poussin, 1651

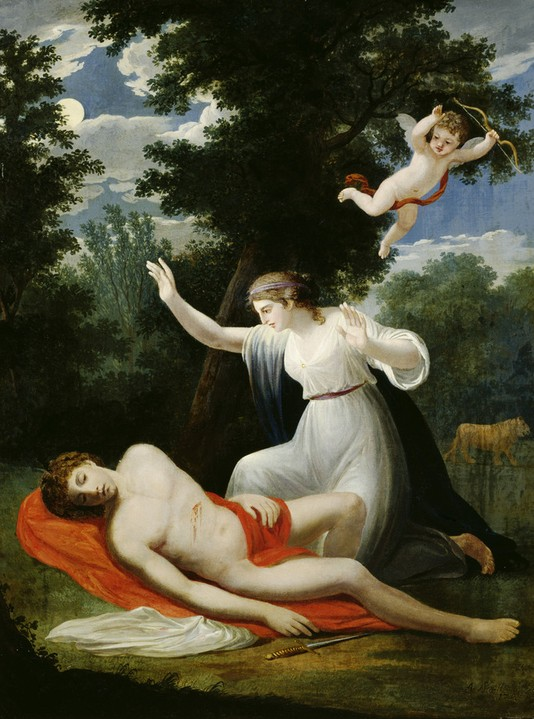
Andreas Nesselthaler, 1795

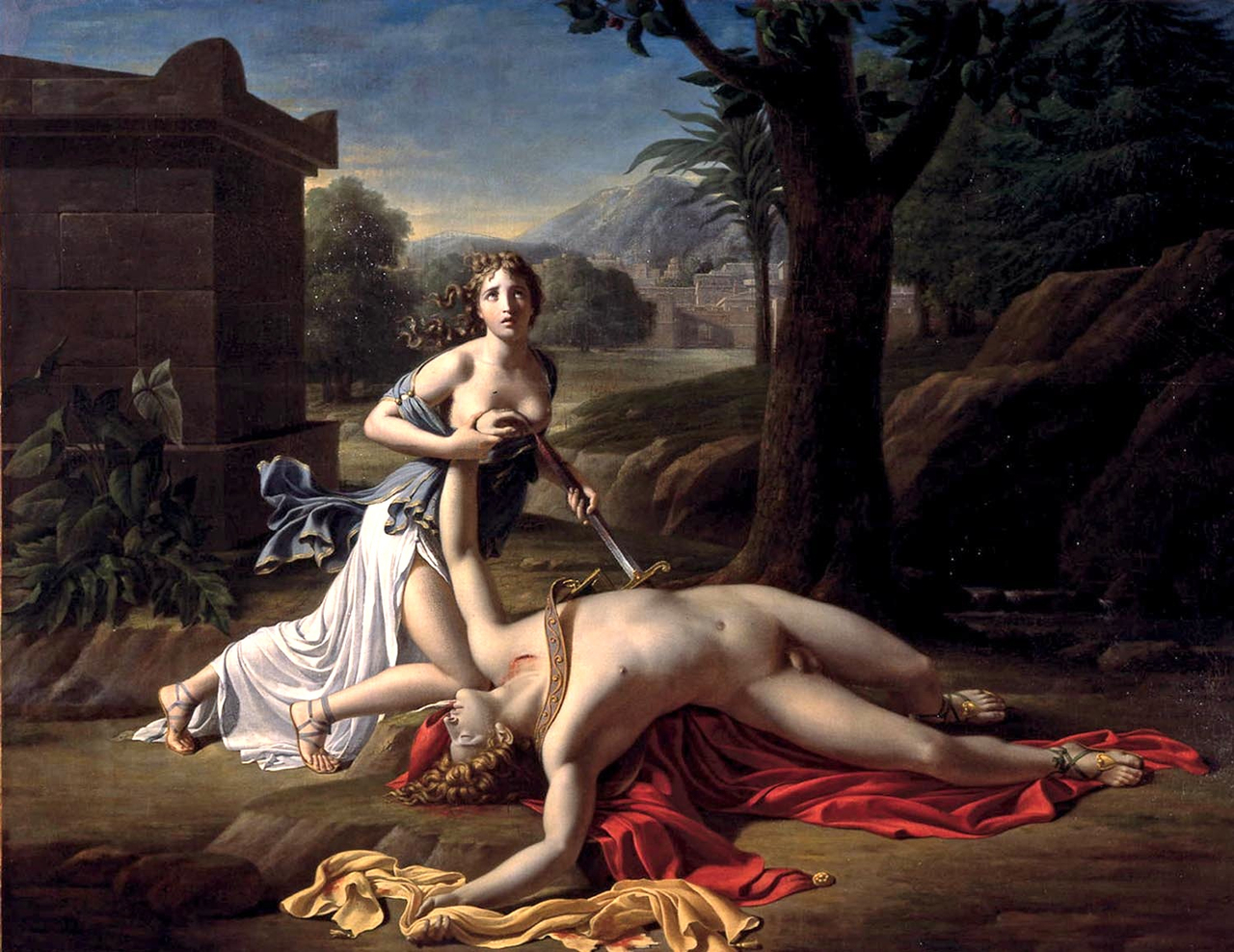
Pierre Gautherot, 1799

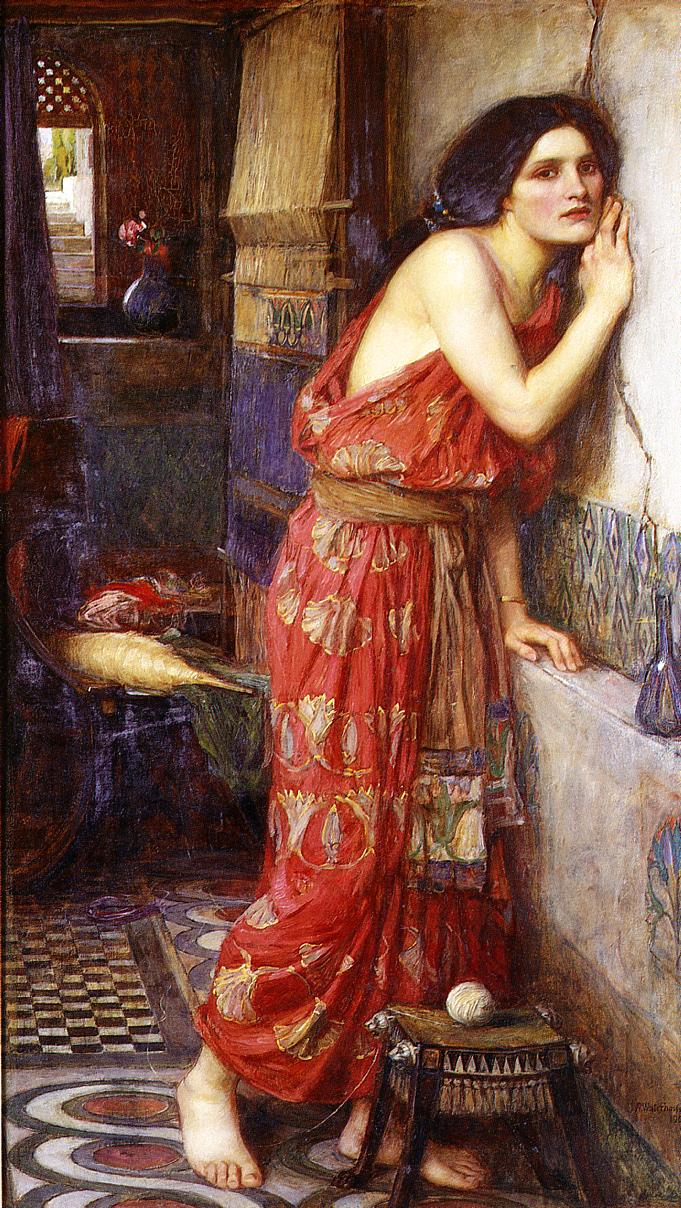
Thisbe, by John William Waterhouse, 1909.

== See also ==
- The Cowherd and the Weaver Girl
- Tristan and Iseult
- Antony and Cleopatra
- Romeo and Juliet
- Latin literature
- Pyramus and Thisbe Club, a UK organisation concerned with party wall legislation

== General references ==
=== Primary sources ===
- Ovid, Metamorphoses iv.55–166

=== Secondary sources ===
- Bulfinch, Thomas, The Age of Fable; Or, Stories of Gods and Heroes (2nd ed.), Sanborn, Carter, and Bazin, 1856
