= Nick Bottom =

Character in A Midsummer Night's Dream

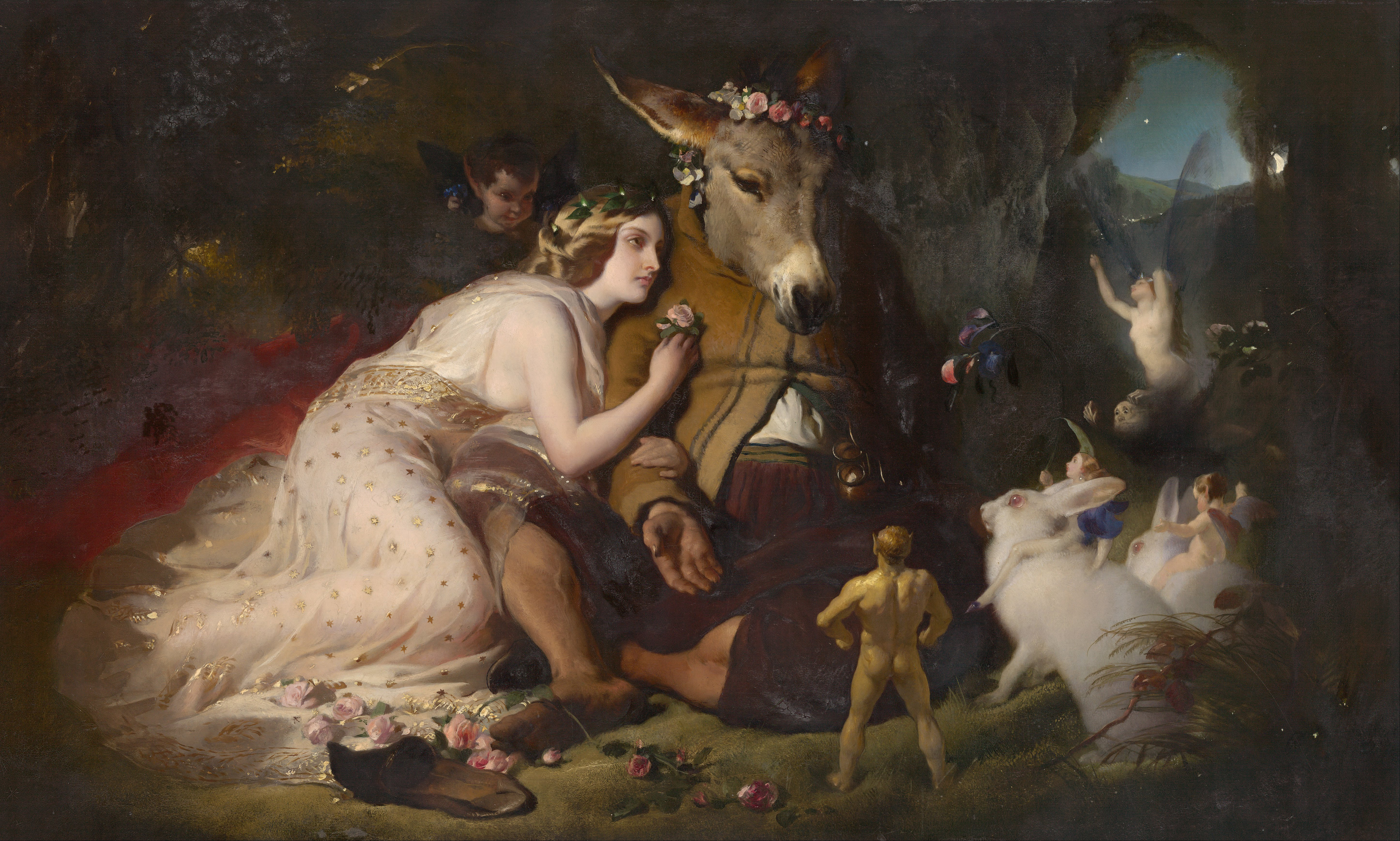
Edwin Landseer, Scene from A Midsummer Night's Dream (1851)

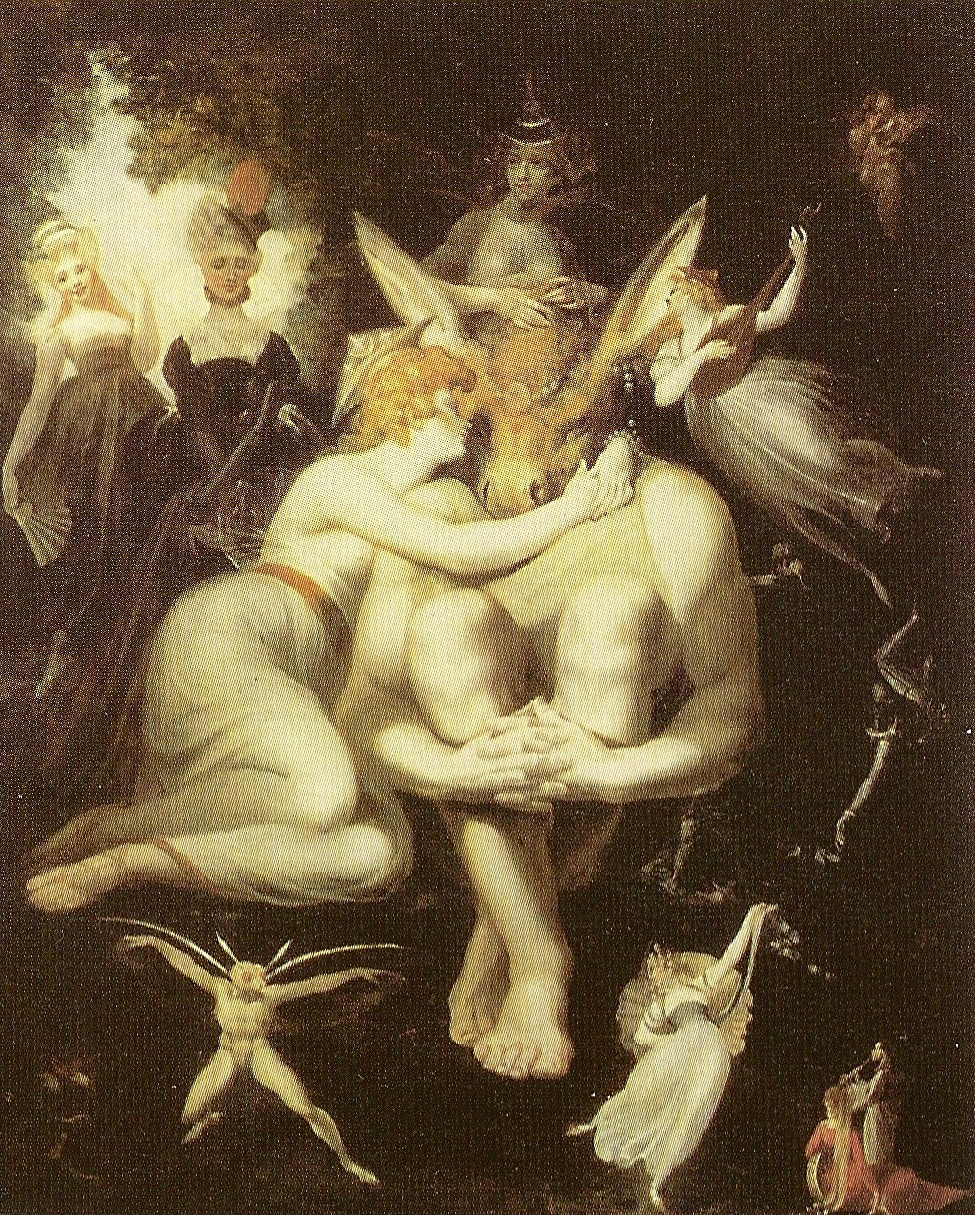
Titania adoring Bottom. Oil on canvas by Henry Fuseli, c. 1790

Nick Bottom is a character in Shakespeare's A Midsummer Night's Dream who provides comic relief throughout the play. A weaver by trade, he is famously known for getting his head transformed into that of a donkey by the elusive Puck. Bottom and Puck are the only two characters who converse with and progress the three central stories in the whole play. Puck is first introduced in the fairies' story and creates the drama of the lovers' story by messing up who loves whom, and places the donkey head on Bottom's in his story. Similarly, Bottom is performing in a play in his story intending it to be presented in the lovers' story, as well as interacting with Titania in the fairies' story.

== Overview ==
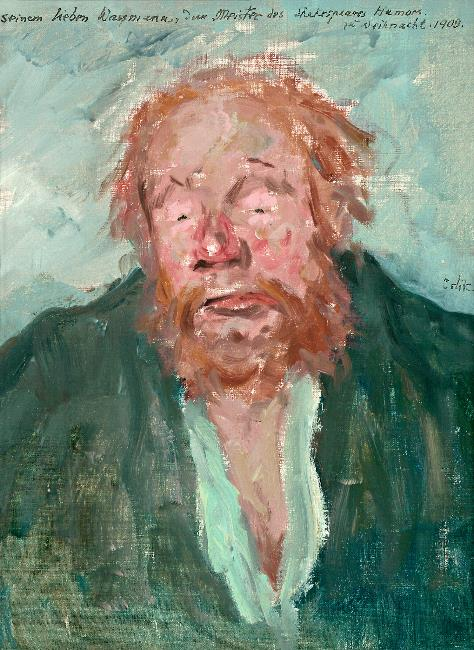
Hans Wassmann as Bottom, by Emil Orlik, 1909

While they are in the woods rehearsing a play for the Duke, the fairy Puck, a mischievous sprite and minion of Oberon, king of the fairies, happens upon their rehearsal. He decides to have some fun with them, carrying out part of Oberon's orders in the process, and when Bottom exits the stage, he transforms his head into a donkey's. When Bottom returns, unaware of his own transformation, his fellow actors run away from him with Quince screaming, "We are haunted!" Bottom believes they are playing a prank on him, proclaiming, "This is to make an ass of me, to fright me if they could." So he stays in the forest by himself and sings loudly to show them he isn't afraid. The Fairy Queen Titania is awakened by Bottom's song. She has been enchanted by a love potion, which will cause her to fall in love with the first living thing that she sees when she wakes (no matter who, or what it is), made from the juice of a rare flower, once hit by Cupid's arrow, that her husband, Oberon, King of the Fairies, spread on her eyes in an act of jealous rage. During his enchantment over her, he utters "Wake when some vile thing is near." The first thing she sees when she wakes is the transformed Bottom, and she immediately falls in love with him. She even commands her fairy minions to serve and wait upon him. Titania kisses Bottom and when he sleeps, they put their arms around each other. Bottom is happy that he is being treated like royalty and Titania loves him so much she puts flowers in his hair. Oberon is amused that Titania has fallen in love with a ridiculous mortal. Later, Oberon finally releases Titania from her enchantment. After being confronted with the reality that her romantic interlude with the transformed Bottom was not just a dream, she is disgusted with the very image of him and also seems very suspicious of how "these things came to pass." After Oberon instructs Puck to return Bottom's head to his human state, which Puck reluctantly does, the fairies leave him sleeping in the woods, nearby the four Athenian lovers, Demetrius, Helena, Hermia, and Lysander.

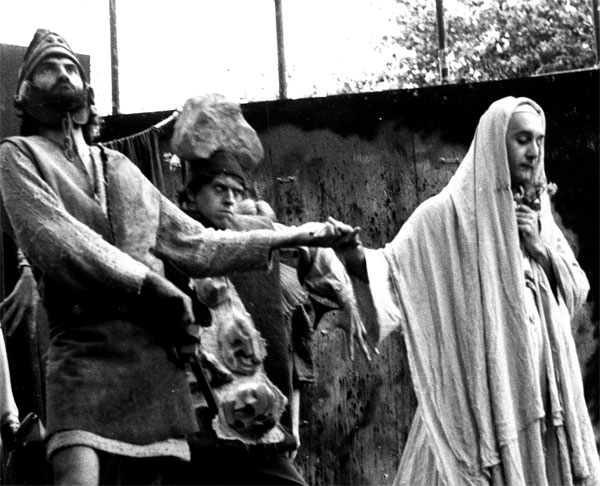
Bottom (left) playing Pyramus in a Riverside Shakespeare Company production

He wakes up after the lovers leave. His first thought is that he has fallen asleep in the woods during rehearsal and has missed his cue. He quickly realizes he has had "a most rare vision". He is amazed by the events of this dream, and soon begins to wonder if it was in fact a dream at all. He quickly decides that he will "get Peter Quince to write a ballad of this dream", and that "it shall be called 'Bottom's Dream,' because it hath no Bottom". Upon being reunited with his friends, he is not even able to utter what has happened and says "For if I tell you, I am no true Athenian".

Theseus ends up choosing Pyramus and Thisbe as the performance for his amusement, now also the wedding day of the young Athenian lovers. The play is poorly written and poorly acted, though obviously performed with a great deal of passion. Bottom performs the famous Pyramus death scene in the play within the play, one of the most comedic moments in the play.

In performance, Bottom, like Horatio in Hamlet, is the only major part that can't be doubled, i.e. that can't be played by an actor who also plays another character, since he is present in scenes involving nearly every character.

== Analysis ==
Bottom's discussion of his dream is considered by Ann Thompson to have emulated two passages from Chaucer's The Book of the Duchess.

Critics have commented on the profound religious implications of Bottom's speech on his awakening without the ass's head in act 4 of A Midsummer Night's Dream:

"[. . .] The eye of
man hath not heard, the ear of man hath not seen,
man's hand is not able to taste, his tongue to conceive,
nor his heart to report, what my dream was. I
will get Peter Quince to write a ballad of this
dream: it shall be called 'Bottom's Dream', because
it hath no bottom; and I will sing it in the latter end
of a play, before the Duke. Peradventure, to make it the
more gracious, I shall sing it at her death." (4.1.209–216)

This speech seems to be a comically jumbled evocation of a passage from the New Testament's 1 Corinthians 2.9–10:

"The things which
eye hathe not sene, nether eare hath heard,
nether came into man's heart, are, which
God hathe prepared for them that love him.
But God hathe reveiled them unto us by
his Spirit: for the Spirit searcheth all
things, yea, the deepe things of God."

Steven Doloff also suggests that Bottom's humorous and foolish performance at the end of "A Midsummer Night's Dream" mimics a passage from the previous chapter of Corinthians:

"For seing the worlde by wisdome knewe
not God in the wisdome of God, it pleased
God by the foolishnes of preaching
to save them that believe:
Seing also that the Jewes require a signe,
and the Grecians seke after wisdome.
But we preache Christ crucified : unto
the Jewes, even a stombling blocke, & unto
the Grecians, foolishnes:
But unto them which are called, bothe
of the Jewes & Grecias we preache Christ,
the power of GOD, and the wisdome of God.
For the foolishnes of God is wiser the men [. . .]." (1 Corinthians 1.21–25)

This passage's description of the sceptical reception Christ was given by his Greek audience appears to be alluded to in Bottom's performance. Just as Christ's preaching is regarded as "foolishness", Bottom's audience perceives his acting (as well as the entirety of the play he is a part of) as completely without value, except for the humor they can find in the actors' hopelessly flawed rendering of their subject matter. Doloff writes that this allusion is especially likely because, in both texts, the sceptical audience of the "foolish" material is composed of Greeks, as the spectators of Bottom et al. are Theseus, the duke of Athens, and his court.

== Scholarly debates ==
The origin of Bottom's farewell to Peter Quince in Act I, scene 2 has become the topic of some disagreement among Shakespeare scholars. Parting with Quince, Bottom instructs his fellow actor to be at the next rehearsal, saying: "Hold or cut bowstrings." The debate is centred on whether this phrase arose from military or civilian life.

George Capell is the first to have offered an explanation of the origin of this phrase. He states that it is a proverbial saying and "was born in the days of archery". When an archery contest was planned, 'assurance of meeting was given in the words of that phrase'. If an archer did not keep the promised meeting, then the other archers might cut his bowstring, that is, 'demolish him for an archer'. From this 'particular usage, the phrase had an easy transition among the vulgar to that general application which Bottom makes of it.'

However, W.L. Godshalk refutes this theory, stating that no subsequent scholars have been able to confirm Capell's ideas. Godshalk also states that it is unlikely that this was a common civilian phrase, as there are no other examples of this exact form of the phrase in the work of any author besides Shakespeare.

Godshalk further cites the work of George Steevens, who was able to find two vaguely parallel examples in seventeenth-century drama. In George Chapman's The Ball, Scutilla asks Lady Lucina, 'have you devices / To jeer the rest?' Lucina answers, 'All the regiment of 'em, or I'll break my bow-strings' (II.ii.127-9). Godshalk argues that the context implied by 'regiment' is important, as it implies that the breaking (or cutting) of bowstrings should be seen in terms of military rather than civilian archery. Steeven's other example is from Anthony Brewer's The Covntrie Girle: A Comedie: 'Fidler, strike. / I strike you else; – and cut your begging bowstrings'. Godshalk writes that "the first 'strike' means 'to play upon' the fiddle; the second 'strike' may again suggest a military context for the cutting of bowstrings, though any reference to military archery is comic since the 'bow' in this case is the fiddler's bow."

Godshalk argues that, just as these examples indicate a military context, this must also be done with Bottom's "hold or cut bow-strings." He further cites Jean Froissart's account of the Battle of Crecy, which supports the military origin of Bottom's line: "When the Genoese felt the arrows piercing through their heads, arms, and breasts, many of them cast down their crossbows, and cut their strings, and resumed discomfited." Archers would cut their bowstrings, thus destroying their weapons, in the midst of a retreat so that the enemy could not use their own instruments against them. It is the equivalent of striking artillery, rendering the equipment useless. With this understanding, Bottom's phrase can be interpreted as a military expression for "hold your position, or give up and retreat." In the context of the play, Bottom is being comically pretentious, saying: "Be present at the rehearsal, or quit the troupe." it ends with the two main characters

== Notable interpretations ==
Actors who have played the role on film include Paul Rogers, James Cagney and Kevin Kline. In the BBC Television Shakespeare version, he is played by Brian Glover. In BBC One's ShakespeaRe-Told, he is played by comedian Johnny Vegas.

Croatian actor Ozren Grabarić portrayed Bottom in a noted and award-winning performance at the Gavella Drama Theatre's cult production of the comedy, directed by Macedonian theatre practitioner Aleksandar Popovski.

At the Czech Theatre of Fidlovačce, Bottom was performed in an alternation between Ctirad Götz and Jakub Slach.

== Cultural depictions ==
Bottom has been the subject of several paintings. German composer Felix Mendelssohn musically referenced Bottom in his overture inspired by A Midsummer Night's Dream, with the strings mimicking an ass's bray on two occasions in the piece. Later German composer Hans Werner Henze has used Bottom twice as an inspiration: in the second sonata which comprises his Royal Winter Music and in his Eighth Symphony.

Nick Bottom is also the main character of the Tony-winning 2015 musical Something Rotten!, in which he competes as a playwright against an antagonistic portrayal of William Shakespeare. It is implied that this version of Shakespeare wrote the character of Bottom as a direct insult.
