= John Hallam filmography =

John Hallam (1941–2006) was a British character actor who appeared prolifically in minor roles on stage, television and in film, with occasional major roles such as Thomas Mallen in the Granada series The Mallens. This article lists all the films and television productions in which Hallam has appeared and the roles he played.

== Filmography ==
=== Film ===
Year	Title	Role	Notes
1968	The Charge of the Light Brigade	Officer	Film debut
1968	Carry On Up the Khyber	Burpa on Rooftop	Uncredited
1969	The Assassination Bureau	Bureau Member	Uncredited
1969	Where's Jack?	The Captain	
1969	A Walk with Love and Death	Sir Meles	
1971	Murphy's War	Ellis	
1971	The Last Valley	Geddes	
1971	Villain	Terry	
1971	Quest for Love	Jonathan Keene	
1971	Nicholas and Alexandra	Nagorny	
1972	The Offence	Panton	
1972	Antony and Cleopatra	Thidias	
1973	Hitler: The Last Ten Days	Guensche	
1973	The Wicker Man	P.C. Hugh McTaggert	Longer version
1975	Hennessy	Boyle	
1976	Trial by Combat	Sir Roger	
1977	The People That Time Forgot	Chung-Sha	
1979	The Saint and the Brave Goose	Bernadotti	
1979	Love and Bullets	Cerutti	
1980	Flash Gordon	Luro	
1981	Dragonslayer	Tyrian	
1985	King David	Philistine Armour Bearer	
1985	Lifeforce	Lamson	
1985	Santa Claus	Grizzard	
1989	When the Whales Came	Treve Pender	
1991	Robin Hood: Prince of Thieves	Red-Headed Baron	
1997	Kull the Conqueror	Mandara	
1998	The Incredible Adventures of Marco Polo	Ali Ben Hassad	
2003	The Selfish Giant	Giant	Final film, Voice

=== Television ===
Year	Title	Role	Notes
1967	Much Ado About Nothing	Watchman #5	TV movie
1968	A Man of our Times	Curate	Episode: Someone I Knew
1968	Armchair Theatre		Episode: "Home Movies"
1968	Softly, Softly	Abel Jackson	Episode: For a Rainy Day
1969	Judge Dee	Nee	Episode: Traitors in High Places
1969	Department S	Doug Martin	Episode: The Man in the Elegant Room
1970	Randall and Hopkirk (Deceased)	Johnny Crackan	Episode: It's Supposed to Be Thicker Than Water
1970	A Family at War	Lieutenant Prideaux	Episode: A Lesson in War
1972	Jason King	John Hewlett	Episode: A Thin Band of Air
1972	The Regiment	Lt James Willoughby	7 episodes
1973	The Adventures of Black Beauty	Roger Carlisle	Episode: The Barge
1973	Moonbase 3	Dr. Peter Conway	3 episodes
1973	Murder Must Advertise	Mr. Ingleby	3 episodes
1974	The Pallisers	Lord Chiltern	8 episodes
1975	Public Eye	Brian Hart	Episode: How About It, Frank?
1975	Thriller	Roscoe	Episode: Murder Motel
1976	Dominic	Captain Beever	8 episodes
1976	Wings	Harry Farmer	TV movie
1976	Arnhem: The Story of an Escape	Colonel Graeme Warrack	TV movie
1977	Crown Court	Alan Clennell	Episode: One for the Road: Part 1
1977	Raffles	Von Heumann	Episode: The Gift of the Emperor
1977	The Mackinnons	Squadron Leader Roger Wayman	Episode: A New Life
1977-1978	Wings	Harry Farmer	10 episodes
1978	The Four Feathers	Sergeant Major	TV movie
1978	The Devil's Crown	Robert Fitzwalter	2 episodes
1979	Return of the Saint	Bernadotti	2 episodes
1979	Dick Turpin	Colonel Tobias Moat	Episode: The Whipping Boy
1979	The Last Giraffe	Guy Atherton	TV movie
1979	The Mallens	Thomas Mallen	4 episodes
1981	Smuggler	Roach	Episode: Forced Run
1982	Ivanhoe	Herald	TV movie
1982	Minder	Gypsy Joe	Episode: In
1982	The Professionals	Tug Willis	Episode: Lawson's Last Stand
1983	Under Capricorn	Samson Flusky	Miniseries
1983	The Black Adder	Sir Wilfred Death	Episode: The Black Seal
1984	The Master of Ballantrae	Captain Harris	TV movie
1986	Lytton's Diary	Guadix	Episode: The Ancien Régime
1986	Prospects	Tubby Rawlinson	Episode: Running All the Way: Part 2
1986	Return to Treasure Island	Captain Parker	5 episodes
1987	Agatha Christie's Miss Marple: 4:50 from Paddington	Cedric Crackenthorpe	TV movie
1987	One by One	Major Jenks	Episode: Remember the Humble Guinea-Pig
1987	Knights of God	Commanding Officer, Weatherby	1 episode
1987	Casualty	Big Ted	Episode: Peace, Brother
1988	White Peak Farm	John Tanner	3 episodes
1988	The Fortunate Pilgrim	Hooperman	1 episode
1988-1990	EastEnders	Barnsey	6 episodes
1989	Doctor Who	Light	Episode: Ghost Light: Part Three
1989	Prince Caspian and the Voyage of the Dawn Treader	Captain Drinian	4 episodes
1990	Emmerdale	Terry Prince	2 episodes
1990	She-Wolf of London	Fergus	Episode: The Bogman of Letchmoor Heath
1990	A Season of Giants	Ludovico Buonarotti	TV movie
1991	Bergerac	Jacques Le Rozier	Episode: The Evil That Men Do
1992	Zorro	Captain Dominguez	Episode: Silk Purses and Sow's Ears
1992	Forever Green	Kazik Zawadzki	1 episode
1993	Grange Hill	Mr. Macarthy	3 episodes
1993	Rides	Matthew	1 episode
1993	Lovejoy	Roderick Frew	Episode: Who Is the Fairest of Them All?
1993	A Haunting Harmony	Staunton	TV movie
1994	The Memoirs of Sherlock Holmes	Gorgiano	Episode: "The Red Circle"
1994	Good King Wenceslas	Gomon	TV movie
1995	99-1	Mark Wise	4 episodes
1995	The Famous Five	Rooky	Episode: Five Get into Trouble
1996	Cadfael	Lord Rhysart	Episode: A Morbid Taste for Bones
1997	Wycliffe	Lionel Penmore	Episode: Bad Blood
1997	All Quiet on the Preston Front	Mr. Lomax	2 episodes
2000	The 10th Kingdom	Queen's Talking Mirror	3 episodes
2000	Arabian Nights	Demon	1 episode
