= List of Shakespearean characters (L–Z) =

Characters appearing in the plays of William Shakespeare whose names begin with the letters L to Z include the following.

Characters who exist outside Shakespeare are marked "(hist)" where they are historical, and "(myth)" where they are mythical. Where that annotation is a link (e.g. (hist)), it is a link to the page for the historical or mythical figure. The annotation "(fict)" is only used in entries for the English history plays, and indicates a character who is fictional.

== L ==
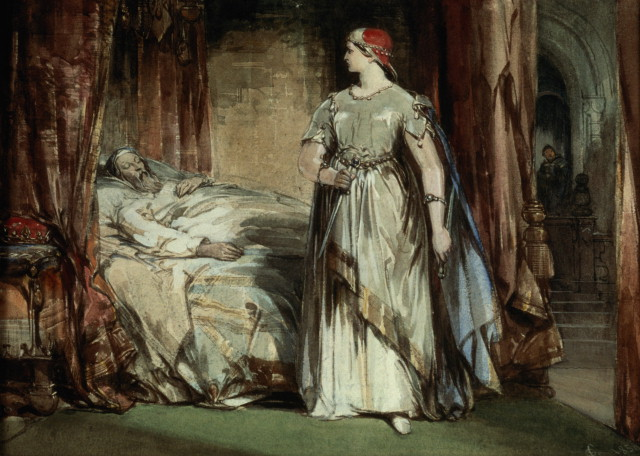
Lady Macbeth by George Cattermole.

- Lady (title):
  - Lady Anne (hist) is the widow of Prince Edward, wooed by Richard over the corpse of her late father-in-law (Henry VI) in Richard III.
  - Lady Bona (hist) is King Lewis's sister-in-law, whose hopes to marry Edward are thwarted, in Henry VI, Part 3.
  - Lady Capulet is Juliet's mother in Romeo and Juliet.
  - Lady Faulconbridge (hist) confesses to her son, the Bastard, that Richard the Lionheart, and not her husband, was his true father, in King John.
  - For Lady Grey see Queen Elizabeth.
  - Lady Macbeth (hist), wife to the protagonist in Macbeth, is a central character who conspires with her husband to murder Duncan. She later goes mad and dies, possibly through suicide.
  - Lady Macduff, wife to Macduff, is murdered, with her children, in Macbeth.
  - Lady Montague is Romeo's mother in Romeo and Juliet.
  - Lady Mortimer (hist), daughter of Glendower and wife of Edmund Mortimer (1), sings in Welsh in Henry IV, Part 1.
  - Lady Northumberland (hist) is the Earl of Northumberland's wife, who dissuades him from joining the rebels at Gaultree Forest in Henry IV, Part 2.
  - Lady Percy (hist) (sometimes called Kate) is Hotspur's wife, later his widow, in Henry IV, Part 1 and Henry IV, Part 2.
  - An Old Lady (fict) is a rather worldly friend of Anne Bullen, in Henry VIII.
  - Two ladies attend on the Queen, in Richard II.
  - Some ladies corroborate Cornelius' report of the Queen's dying words, in Cymbeline.
  - Several ladies dance in a masque, in Timon of Athens.
  - For "Lady" in Cymbeline, see Helen.
- Laertes is the son of Polonius and the brother of Ophelia in Hamlet. He fights with Hamlet in the famous fencing scene in the final act.
- Lafew is a French lord in All's Well That Ends Well.
- Lancaster:
  - John of Gaunt, Duke of Lancaster (hist) is uncle to King Richard and father to Bolingbroke in Richard II.
  - Prince John of Lancaster (hist) is the younger brother of Hal in Henry IV, Part 1, Henry IV, Part 2, and Henry V. He is also the Duke of Bedford who is Regent of France in Henry VI, Part 1.
  - See also Bolingbroke (Henry IV), Henry V, Henry VI, Queen Margaret, Prince Edward and Lady Anne, all of whom are either "Duke of Lancaster" or "of the House of Lancaster".
- Titus Lartius and Cominius are leaders of the Roman forces against the Volscians in Coriolanus.
- Launce is a clownish servant of Proteus, in The Two Gentlemen of Verona. He and his dog, Crab, have a tendency to steal the show.
- Launcelot Gobbo is a clown in The Merchant of Venice, a servant to Shylock, and later to Lorenzo.
- Friar Laurence is confessor and confidant to Romeo in Romeo and Juliet. He instigates the unsuccessful plot involving the potion drunk by Juliet.
- Lavatch is a clown in the service of the Countess of Rousillion, in All's Well That Ends Well.
- Lavinia is the daughter of Titus in Titus Andronicus. She is raped by Chiron and Demetrius, her tongue is cut out and her hands cut off.
- For Lawrence see Laurence.
- A Lawyer plucks a white rose, in the rose-plucking scene in Henry VI, Part 1.
- King Lear (hist) is the central character in King Lear. He divides his kingdom among his two elder daughters, is rejected by them, runs mad, and dies.
- Monsieur LeBeau is a courtier in As You Like It.
- Monsieur LeFer is a French soldier. Pistol hopes to ransom him in Henry V.
- Legate:
  - A Legate confers Winchester's Cardinalship (apparently obtained through bribery) in Henry VI, Part 1.
  - See also Pandulph.
- Popilius Lena, a senator, briefly frightens the conspirators into a belief that their plot may have been discovered, with his line "I wish your enterprise today might thrive", in Julius Caesar.
- Lennox is a thane in Macbeth.
- Leonardo is Bassanio's servant in The Merchant of Venice.
- Leonato is the governor of Messina, and the father of Hero, in Much Ado About Nothing.
- Leonatus:
  - Posthumus Leonatus (usually just "Posthumus") is the exiled husband of Imogen, in Cymbeline. Persuaded she has been unfaithful, he orders Pisanio to kill her.
  - Sicilius Leonatus, father of Posthumus in Cymbeline, appears as a ghost, and pleads to Jupiter to resolve Posthumus' troubles.
  - The mother of Posthumus and two brothers of Posthumus appear as ghosts in Cymbeline, and plead to Jupiter to resolve Posthumus' troubles.
- Leonine is ordered to kill Marina, by Dionyza, in Pericles, Prince of Tyre. She is captured by pirates before he can do so.
- Leontes is the king of Sicilia in The Winter's Tale. He wrongly suspects his wife, Hermione, of infidelity.
- Marcus Aemilius Lepidus (hist) is one of the Triumvirs, the three rulers of Rome after Caesar's death, in Julius Caesar and Antony and Cleopatra.
- Lewis:
  - King Lewis XI of France (hist), insulted by Edward IV's marriage to Lady Grey, allies himself with Warwick and Margaret in Henry VI, Part 3.
  - Lewis (hist) is the Dauphin in King John. He marries John's niece, Blanche, to cement an alliance with England. Later he leads forces against John.
  - Note that "Lewis" in Shakespeare is equivalent to an historical "Louis".
- Lieutenant:
  - A Lieutenant (fict) hands over the Duke of Suffolk to Walter Whitmore, and therefore to his death, in Henry VI, Part 2.
  - A Lieutenant of the Tower of London appears as Henry's jailer in Henry VI, Part 3.
  - A Volscian Lieutenant to Aufidius questions Aufidius about his alliance in Coriolanus.
  - A Roman Lieutenant has one half-line in Coriolanus.
  - See also Brackenbury, who is Lieutenant of the Tower of London in Richard III.
  - Numerous characters hold (or purport to hold) the rank of Lieutenant, including Michael Cassio and Bardolph.
- Caius Ligarius (hist) is one of the conspirators against Caesar in Julius Caesar.
- Limoges (hist) is the Duke of Austria in King John. He is intimidated – and eventually beheaded in battle – by the Bastard.
- The Bishop of Lincoln (hist) speaks in favour of Henry's divorce, in the trial scene of Henry VIII.
- For Lion see Snug.
- For Litio see Hortensio, who calls himself Litio in his disguise as a music master.
- Lodovico is a kinsman of Brabantio in Othello.
- For Friar Lodowick in Measure for Measure see Vincentio.
- London:
  - The Lord Mayor of London (hist) is fooled by Richard and Buckingham, and supports Richard's succession, in Richard III.
  - The Mayor of London must make peace between the fighting servants of Gloucester and Winchester, in Henry VI, Part 1.
- Longaville (hist), with Berowne and Dumaine, is one of the three companions of The King of Navarre in Love's Labour's Lost.
- Lord (title):
  - A Lord initiates the practical joke on Christopher Sly in the induction to The Taming of the Shrew.
  - A Lord helps with the preparations for the fencing in Hamlet.
  - A Lord attends on the Princess of France in Love's Labour's Lost.
  - A Lord conspires with Lennox in Macbeth.
  - A Lord of Tarsus reports the approach of Pericles' ships, in Pericles, Prince of Tyre.
  - A Lord of Mytilene, in Pericles, Prince of Tyre, appears in the shipboard reconciliation scene between Pericles and Marina.
  - A Lord speaks four words ("It is, my lord") in Much Ado About Nothing.
  - A Lord who fled from the battle between the Romans and the Britons meets Posthumus, in the battle's aftermath, in Cymbeline.
  - Two Lords, together with Amiens, report Jaques' encounter with the deer in As You Like It.
  - Two Lords are followers of Duke Frederick in As You Like It.
  - Two Lords attend on the bragging Cloten, in Cymbeline.
  - Two Lords, the brothers Dumaine, attend the King of France before departing to the wars in All's Well That Ends Well, and play an important part in the mock-interrogation of Parolles.
  - Three Lords of Tyre lead a revolt (of sorts) in Pericles, Prince of Tyre: insisting that they will make Helicanus their ruler if Pericles does not return to Tyre within one year.
  - Three Lords of Pentapolis comment on Pericles' unimpressive appearance prior to the tournament, in Pericles, Prince of Tyre.
  - Three Lords are among the flatterers, and false friends, of Timon in Timon of Athens.
  - Four Lords in All's Well That Ends Well (two of whom may be the brothers Dumaine described as "Two Lords", above) attend the King of France after he is cured, and are considered as potential husbands for Helena.
  - A number of Volscian Lords, three of them speaking roles, appear in the concluding scene of Coriolanus, and witness Coriolanus' death.
  - The Lord Chamberlain, in Henry VIII (hist & hist) is a conflation of two historical Lords Chamberlain, one of them Lord Sandys, who is also a character in the play.
  - The Lord Chancellor (hist) – historically Sir Thomas More, although not identified as such in the play – is among the Privy Counsellors who accuse Cranmer in Henry VIII.
  - The Lord Chief Justice (hist) is a dramatic foil to Falstaff in Henry IV, Part 2.
  - The Lord Mayor of London (hist) is fooled by Richard and Buckingham, and supports Richard's succession, in Richard III.
  - For Lord Rivers see Earl Rivers.
  - "Lord" is a common designation for supernumerary characters at the royal and ducal courts.
- Lorenzo is a Christian in The Merchant of Venice who elopes with Shylock's daughter, Jessica.
- For Louis see Lewis.
- Lovell:
  - Lord Lovell (hist) is a henchman of Richard in Richard III.
  - Sir Thomas Lovell (hist) is a courtier of King Henry, in Henry VIII.
- Luce:
  - Luce is a tarty servant to Adriana in The Comedy of Errors.
  - See also countrywomen.
- Lucentio falls in love with Bianca, and disguises himself as a Latin master in order to woo her. They marry at the end of The Taming of the Shrew.
- Lucetta is Julia's maid in The Two Gentlemen of Verona.
- Luciana in The Comedy of Errors is shocked to be importuned by her brother-in-law's twin, who she believes to be her sister's husband.
- For Lucianus, see Third Player.
- Lucilius:
  - Lucilius is a servant of Timon in Timon of Athens. He loves the daughter of the Old Athenian, and Titus provides him with a fortune, to make him her equal.
  - Lucilius is a soldier of Brutus' and Cassius' party in Julius Caesar. He pretends to be Brutus during the battle at Philippi.
- Lucio, a friend of Claudio, frequently slanders the duke in Measure for Measure, and is eventually forced to marry Kate Keepdown.
- Lucius:
  - Caius Lucius is the Roman ambassador in Cymbeline, and the leader of the Roman forces.
  - Lucius, a boy, is a servant attending on Brutus, in Julius Caesar.
  - Lucius is a lord in Timon of Athens, who flatters Titus but proves a false friend.
  - Lucius is the son of Titus in Titus Andronicus. He ends the play as Emperor of Rome, following the death of most major characters.
  - Young Lucius, son of Luicus in Titus Andronicus, and usually cast as a child, plays a part in exposing his aunt's rapists.
  - For Lucius' Servant (in Timon of Athens), see servant.
- Lucullus:
  - Lucullus is a lord in Timon of Athens, who flatters Titus but proves a false friend.
  - For Lucullus' Servant, see servant
- Sir William Lucy (fict) is a soldier and messenger for the English in France in Henry VI, Part 1.
- Lychorida is Thaisa's nurse, then (after Thaisa's supposed death in childbirth) Marina's nurse, in Pericles, Prince of Tyre.
- Lysander loves Hermia in A Midsummer Night's Dream. For a period in the middle of the play, under the influence of love in idleness, he rejects her and loves Helena.
- Lysimachus is the governor of Mytilene, in Pericles, Prince of Tyre. He is converted from debauchery by Marina, and eventually reunites her with her father, Pericles.

== M ==
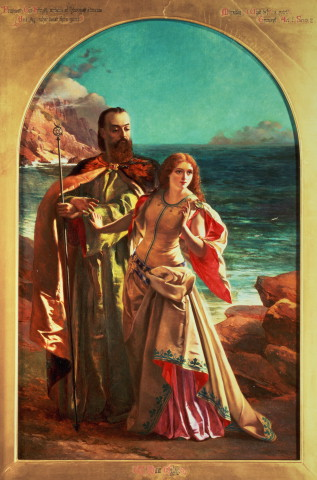
Miranda with Prospero by William Maw Egley

- Macbeth:
  - Macbeth (hist) is the central character in Macbeth. Influenced by the prophecies of three witches, he murders Duncan to take his place as king of Scotland.
  - Lady Macbeth (hist), wife to Macbeth, is a central character who conspires with her husband to murder Duncan. She later goes mad and dies, possibly through suicide.
- Macduff:
  - Macduff is the Thane of Fife in Macbeth. Not being "born of woman", he fights on Malcolm's side at the end of the play, and kills Macbeth.
  - Lady Macduff, wife to Macduff, is murdered, with her children, in Macbeth.
  - Macduff's Son is murdered on Macbeth's orders.
- Macmorris (fict) is an Irish captain in Henry V. He is said to be Shakespeare's only Irish character.
- Maecenas (hist) is a follower of Caesar in Antony and Cleopatra.
- Malcolm (hist) is the eldest son of Duncan in Macbeth.
- Malvolio is steward to, and secretly in love with, Olivia in Twelfth Night. He is gulled by Maria, Sir Toby Belch, Feste, Fabian and Sir Andrew Aguecheek, and is imprisoned as a madman.
- Mamillius is the young son of Leontes and Hermione whose death is reported in the trial scene of The Winter's Tale.
- Man:
  - A Man, Troilus' Servant, has one line in Troilus and Cressida.
  - An Old Man is Gloucester's tenant, who helps with his escape, in King Lear.
  - An Old Man reports the supernatural happenings on the night of Duncan's murder to Ross, in Macbeth.
  - The banter of a Porter and a Porter's Man introduces the finale – Elizabeth's christening – in Henry VIII.
  - Man is occasionally a designation for supernumerary characters.
- Marcade, a French messenger brings the Princess of France the news that her father, the king, has died, in Love's Labour's Lost.
- Marcellus and Barnardo are soldiers who invite Horatio to see the ghost of Old Hamlet, in Hamlet.
- Marcus:
  - Marcus Aemilius Lepidus (hist) is one of the Triumvirs, the three rulers of Rome after Caesar's death, in Julius Caesar and Antony and Cleopatra.
  - Marcus Andronicus is the brother of Titus Andronicus.
  - Marcus Brutus (hist) (usually just Brutus) is a central character of Julius Caesar, who conspires against Caesar's life and stabs him.
  - See also Mark, especially in the context of the Roman plays, where the two are often interchangeable. Mark Antony, for example, was historically "Marcus Antonius".
- Mardian is a eunuch attending on Cleopatra in Antony and Cleopatra.
- Margarelon is a bastard son of Priam who spares the life of Thersites in Troilus and Cressida.
- Margaret:
  - Margaret is a maid, and an unknowing accomplice in the plot against Hero, in Much Ado About Nothing.
  - Queen Margaret (hist) appears as a naive girl in Henry VI, Part 1 and as an embittered old woman in Richard III. She is a central character of the two intervening plays, Henry VI, Part 2 and Henry VI, Part 3, in which she is the wife of Henry VI, and a leader of his armies. In her most notable scene she supervises the murder/execution of Richard Duke of York.
- Maria:
  - Maria is a maid to Olivia, and the instigator of the plot against Malvolio, in Twelfth Night.
  - Maria is a lady attending on the Princess of France in Love's Labour's Lost. She becomes romantically entangled with Longaville.
- Mariana:
  - Mariana is the jilted fiancée of Angelo, who sleeps with him in the "bed trick" in Measure for Measure.
  - Mariana is a friend of the Widow in All's Well That Ends Well.
- Marina is the virtuous daughter of the hero in Pericles, Prince of Tyre. Sold into a brothel, she converts her customers from their lives of debauchery.
- Mariners:
  - A number of mariners are supernumerary characters in The Tempest.
  - See also Sailors.
- Mark:
  - Mark Antony (hist) (Often just Antony, and sometimes Marcus Antonius) turns the mob against Caesar's killers and becomes a Triumvir in Julius Caesar. His romance with Cleopatra drives the action of Antony and Cleopatra.
  - See also Marcus
- Marquess:
  - The Marquess of Montague (hist) is a follower of Warwick (his brother) in Henry VI, Part 3.
  - For Marquess of Suffolk see Duke of Suffolk. William De La Pole held both titles during the period dramatised by Shakespeare.
- The Marshal of the tournament at Pentapolis is a minor character in Pericles, Prince of Tyre.
- Sir Oliver Martext is a foolish priest in As You Like It.
- Martius:
  - Caius Martius Coriolanus (hist) is the central character of Coriolanus, who earns the title "Coriolanus" in recognition of his skill at smiting Volscians in Coriolai.
  - For Young Martius in Coriolanus, see Boy.
  - Martius and Quintus, two sons of the title character in Titus Andronicus, have the same story: returning from the wars they sacrifice one of Tamora's sons. They defy their father over Saturninus' claim to the hand of Lavinia. They are framed and executed for Bassianus' murder.
- Marullus and Flavius are tribunes of the people, dismayed by the enthusiasm of the commoners for the return of Caesar, in the opening scene of Julius Caesar.
- Master:
  - A Master captains Alonso's ship, in The Tempest.
  - A Master (fict) ransomes a gentleman in Henry VI, Part 2.
  - For Master Brook see Master Ford.
  - Master Ford is a central character in The Merry Wives of Windsor. He suspects his wife of infidelity with Sir John Falstaff. He tests Falstaff in disguise, calling himself Master Brook.
  - The Master Gunner of Orleans leaves his boy in charge of the artillery, in Henry VI, Part 1.
  - The Master Gunner's Boy kills Salisbury, in Henry VI, Part 1.
  - Master Page is the husband of Mistress Page and the father of Anne and William in The Merry Wives of Windsor. He plans to have Anne married to Slender.
  - See also Captain.
- A Mate (fict) ransomes a gentleman in Henry VI, Part 2.
- Matthew Gough (hist) is an enemy of Jack Cade's rebels in Henry VI, Part 2.
- For Maudlin, see Countrywomen.
- Mayor:
  - The Lord Mayor of London (hist) is fooled by Richard and Buckingham, and supports Richard's succession, in Richard III.
  - The Mayor of London (hist) must make peace between the fighting servants of Gloucester and Winchester, in Henry VI, Part 1.
  - The Mayor of St. Albans appears briefly in the "Simpcox" episode in Henry VI, Part 2.
  - The Mayor of York (hist) reluctantly supports the Yorkists in Henry VI, Part 3.
- Meg:
  - See Mistress Page, who is sometimes addressed as "Meg".
  - See also Margaret.
- Melun (hist) is a French lord who fights for the Dauphin's party, in King John.
- Menas (hist) a follower of Pompey, suggests cutting loose the boat where the Triumvirs are feasting, in Antony and Cleopatra.
- Menecrates (hist) is a follower of Pompey in Antony and Cleopatra.
- Menelaus (myth), king of Sparta and husband of the captured Helen, is one of the Greek leaders in Troilus and Cressida.
- Menenius Agrippa is a friend and supporter of Coriolanus in his political struggles, in Coriolanus.
- Menteth is a thane in Macbeth.
- Merchant:
  - A merchant speaks well of Timon, in the opening scene of Timon of Athens.
  - Three merchants, one of whom is named Balthasar, add to the confusion in The Comedy of Errors.
- Mercutio is the witty friend of Romeo, and kinsman to the Prince, in Romeo and Juliet. He is killed by Tybalt.
- Messala is one of the senior soldiers of Brutus' and Cassius' party, in Julius Caesar.
- Messenger:
  - A messenger reports the escape of Antipholus of Ephesus and Dromio of Ephesus to Adriana, in The Comedy of Errors.
  - A messenger brings a letter from Angelo to the Provost, ordering Claudio's death that night, in Measure for Measure.
  - A messenger reports Pericles flight from Antioch to Antiochus, in Pericles, Prince of Tyre.
  - A messenger brings news of a Turkish fleet to the Venetian Senate, in Othello.
  - A messenger delivers the heads of Quintus and Martius, and Titus' own severed hand, to Titus Andronicus.
  - A messenger from Bertram briefly visits the brothers Dumaine in All's Well That Ends Well.
  - A messenger (fict) gets a dressing-down from Katherine and Griffith for his abrupt manner, in Henry VIII.
  - A messenger to the Roman leaders brings news of the preparations for battle against the Volsces, in Coriolanus.
  - Two messengers to Claudius in Hamlet (or possibly one messenger appearing twice) bring news of Laertes' rebellious approach, and Hamlet's letter delivered by the sailors.
  - Two messengers appear in The Two Noble Kinsmen. One has a lengthy speech describing Arcite's first knight.
  - Two messengers in Cymbeline (or possibly one messenger appearing twice) bring news of the Roman Ambassador's approach, and the disappearance of Imogen.
  - Three messengers bring bad news to the English lords at Henry V's funeral, in Henry VI, Part 1.
  - Three messengers, two to Albany and the other to Cordelia, appear in King Lear.
  - Three messengers are minor characters in Timon of Athens: one negotiates Ventidius' bail, another announces Alcibiades arrival at Timon's first feast with companions, the third announces Alcibiades approach towards Athens with soldiers.
  - Three messengers, two English bringing messages to Talbot and York, and one French bringing a message to Talbot, appear in Henry VI, Part 1.
  - Four messengers bring (mostly) bad news to Richard, in Richard III.
  - Several messengers appear in Much Ado About Nothing: one of them is an important figure in the opening scene.
  - Numerous messengers appear in Antony and Cleopatra:
    - A messenger brings "News, my good lord, from Rome" in the opening scene. Antony refuses to hear him.
    - Three messengers bring news to Antony of various military defeats, and of Fulvia's death.
    - Two messengers bring news to Caesar of Pompey's (and his allies') naval preparations.
    - One messenger is a mid-sized role: the unfortunate carrier of the message to Cleopatra that Antony has married Octavia, and who later reports (unflatteringly) on Octavia's looks and bearing.
    - A messenger brings Antony news that Caesar has taken Toryne.
    - A messenger summons Canidius to Antony.
    - A messenger informs Caesar that Antony is come into the field.
- Metellus Cimber (hist) is one of the conspirators in Julius Caesar.
- Michael:
  - Michael (fict) is a follower of Jack Cade in Henry VI, Part 2.
  - Michael Cassio is a lieutenant in Othello. Iago persuades Othello that Cassio is having an affair with Othello's wife, Desdemona.
  - Michael Williams (fict) (notably played by Michael Williams in Kenneth Branagh's film version) is a soldier who challenges the disguised Henry to a duel, in Henry V.
  - Sir Michael is a minor character, a follower of the Archbishop of York, in Henry IV, Part 1.
- The Duke of Milan is patron to both Valentine and Proteus, and is the father of Silvia, in The Two Gentlemen of Verona.
- Baptista Minola is the father of Katherine and Bianca in The Taming of the Shrew.
- Miranda is the 15-year-old daughter of Prospero in The Tempest. She falls in love with Ferdinand.
- For Monmouth see Hal, who is sometimes called Monmouth or Harry Monmouth, after his place of birth.
- Monsieur:
  - Monsieur LeBeau is a courtier in As You Like It.
  - Monsieur LeFer is a French soldier. Pistol hopes to ransom him in Henry V.
- Montague:
  - Montague is Romeo's father, an enemy of Capulet, in Romeo and Juliet.
  - Lady Montague is Romeo's mother in Romeo and Juliet.
  - The Marquess of Montague (hist) is a follower of Warwick (his brother) in Henry VI, Part 3.
  - See also Romeo and Benvolio.
- Montano is the Governor of Cyprus in Othello.
- Sir John Montgomery (historically Thomas Montgomery) is a minor Yorkist character in Henry VI, Part 3.
- Montjoy (fict) is the French herald in Henry V.
- For Moonshine see Robin Starveling.
- Mopsa and Dorcas are shepherdesses, usually portrayed as rather tarty, in The Winter's Tale.
- Morgan (real name Belarius) steals the two infant sons of the king in Cymbeline, and raises them as his own.
- The Prince of Morocco is an unsuccessful suitor to Portia in The Merchant of Venice.
- Mortimer:
  - Edmund Mortimer (1) (hist) is a claimant to the English throne, and a leader of the rebel forces, in Henry IV, Part 1.
  - Edmund Mortimer (2) (hist) explains the Yorkist claim to the crown to Richard Duke of York (1), in Henry VI, Part 1.
  - Lady Mortimer, daughter of Glendower and wife of Edmund Mortimer (1), sings in Welsh in Henry IV, Part 1.
  - Sir Hugh Mortimer (hist) is an uncle of Richard Duke of York (1) in Henry VI, Part 3.
  - Sir John Mortimer (hist) is an uncle of Richard Duke of York (1) in Henry VI, Part 3.
  - See also Jack Cade, who falsely claims to be one John Mortimer, a claimant to the throne.
- Morton (fict) is a messenger to the Earl of Northumberland in Henry IV, Part 2.
- Moth:
  - Moth (1) is page to Don Armado in Love's Labour's Lost.
  - Moth (2) is a fairy in A Midsummer Night's Dream.
- For Mother of Posthumus see Leonatus.
- Mouldy is nearly pressed into military service by Falstaff in Henry IV, Part 2.
- Mowbray:
  - Lord Mowbray is a rebel leader in Henry IV, Part 2.
  - Thomas Mowbray, Duke of Norfolk (hist) is Bolingbroke's enemy, exiled by Richard, in Richard II.
- Murderer:
  - Three murderers kill Banquo, although his son Fleance escapes them, in Macbeth.
  - Two murderers report having killed Duke Humphrey in Henry VI, Part 2.
  - Two murderers kill Clarence on Richard's orders in Richard III.
- Musician:
  - Several musicians, one of whom is a speaking role, are made fun of by the clown in Othello.
  - Several musicians attend on Cloten in Cymbeline. One of them sings "Hark, hark the lark."
  - See also Simon Catling, Hugh Rebeck and James Soundpost.
  - Musicians often appear as supernumerary characters.
- Mustardseed is a fairy in A Midsummer Night's Dream.
- Mutius, son of the protagonist, tries to prevent his father from pursuing Lavinia and Bassianus, but is killed by his father in Titus Andronicus.
- Several Myrmidons (myth) kill Hector on Achilles' orders, in Troilus and Cressida.

== N ==
- For Nan see Anne Page, who is sometimes addressed as Nan.
- Nathaniel:
  - Nathaniel is a servant of Petruchio in The Taming of the Shrew.
  - Sir Nathaniel is a parson in Love's Labour's Lost. He is a comic character, and a friend of Holofernes. He appears as Alexander the Conqueror in the pageant of the Nine Worthies.
- The King of Navarre (Ferdinand, loosely based on Henry III) and his three noble companions, Berowne, Dumaine, and Longaville, vow to study and fast for three years, at the outset of Love's Labour's Lost.
- Ned:
  - Ned Poins (fict) is a highwayman, and a close companion of Hal, in Henry IV, Part 1 and Henry IV, Part 2.
  - See also Edward.
  - See also Boy.
- Nell:
  - See Mistress Quickly, whose first name is Nell.
  - A "Nell" is unflatteringly described by Doromio of Syracuse in The Comedy of Errors: she may be the same person as the character Luce, misnamed.
  - See also Countrywomen.
  - See also Helen.
- Nerissa is Portia's maid in The Merchant of Venice. She marries Gratiano. She disguises herself as a page when Portia disguises herself as a lawyer.
- Nestor (myth) is an elderly Greek leader in Troilus and Cressida.
- Nicholas/Nick:
  - Nicholas is a servant of Petruchio in The Taming of the Shrew.
  - Nick (fict) is a follower of Jack Cade in Henry VI, Part 2.
  - Nick Bottom is a weaver, one of the mechanicals, in A Midsummer Night's Dream. While rehearsing a play, Puck changes Bottom's head for an ass's head. Titania falls in love with him. He plays Pyramus in Pyramus and Thisbe.
  - Sir Nicholas Vaux (hist) is a minor character in the scene leading to Buckingham's execution, in Henry VIII.
- For Nim see Nym.
- For Ninacor in Coriolanus, see Roman.
- A Nobleman (fict) brings news of Henry's arrest to the Yorkist leaders in Henry VI, Part 3.
- Norfolk:
  - The Duke of Norfolk (hist) is a supporter of the Yorkists in Henry VI, Part 3 and Richard III.
  - The Duke of Norfolk (hist & hist) is an associate of Buckingham in Henry VIII.
  - Thomas Mowbray, Duke of Norfolk (hist) is Bolingbroke's enemy, exiled by Richard, in Richard II.
- Northumberland:
  - The Earl of Northumberland, Henry Percy, (hist) is an important character in Richard II, where he is Bolingbroke's chief ally, and in Henry IV, Part 1 and Henry IV, Part 2, in which he leads the rebellion against his former ally, who is now king.
  - The Earl of Northumberland (hist) fights for the Lancastrians in Henry VI, Part 3.
  - Lady Northumberland (hist) is the Earl of Northumberland's wife, who dissuades him from joining the rebels at Gaultree Forest in Henry IV, Part 2.
  - See also Seyward in Macbeth.
- Nurse:
  - The Nurse is a bawdy comic character, and a confidante of Juliet, in Romeo and Juliet.
  - The Nurse helps to deliver Aaron's son to Tamora, in Titus Andronicus. Aaron murders her.
- Nym (fict) is a follower of Sir John Falstaff in The Merry Wives of Windsor, and a companion of Pistol and Bardolph in Henry V.
- Several nymphs (myth) dance in the masque in The Tempest, and are part of the wedding procession which opens The Two Noble Kinsmen.

== O ==
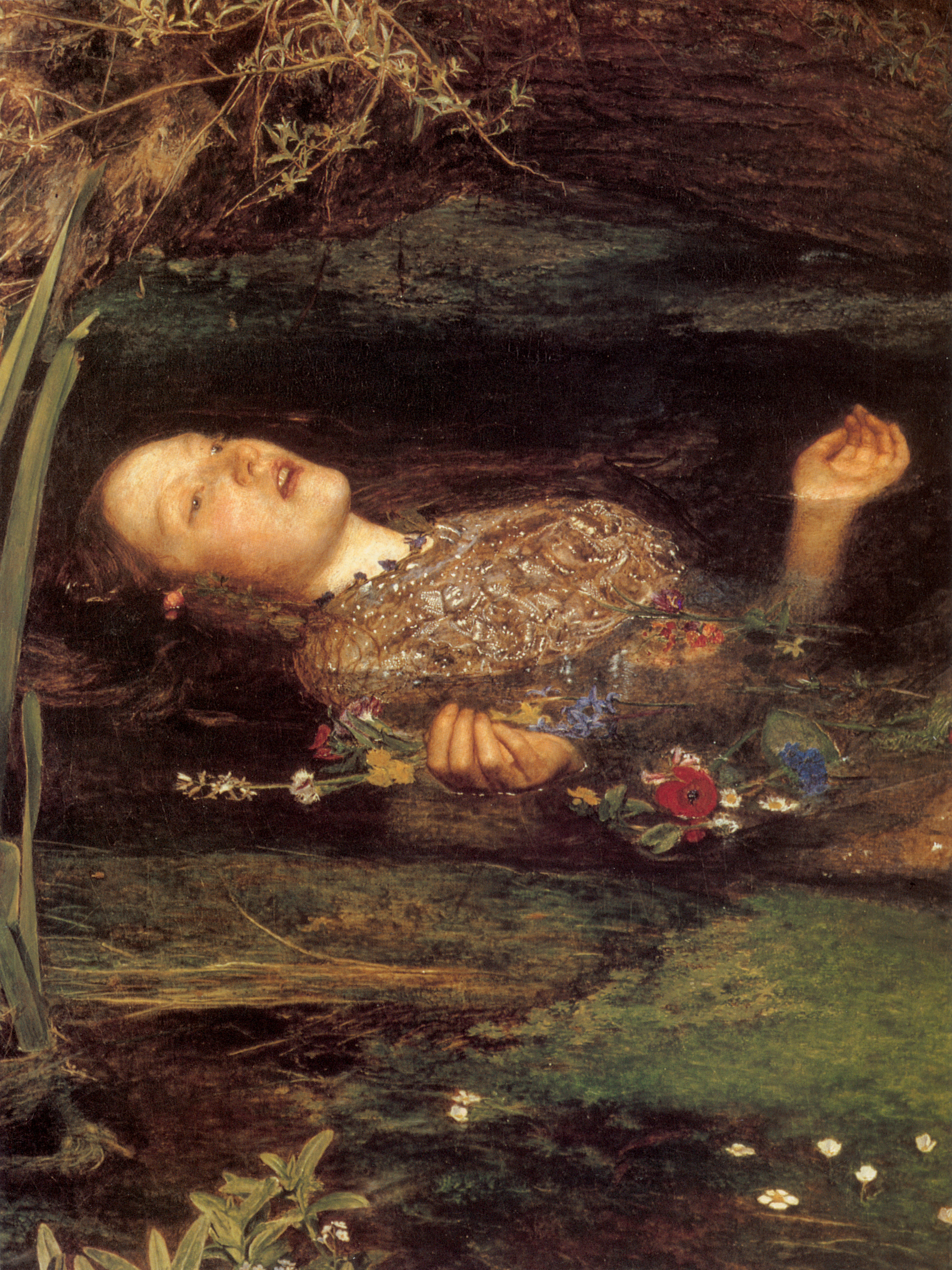
Detail from Millais' famous portrait of Ophelia

- Hugh Oatcake is a member of the Watch in Much Ado About Nothing.
- Oberon (myth) is king of the fairies in A Midsummer Night's Dream.
- Octavia (hist), sister of Octavius, marries Mark Antony when he is widowed in Antony and Cleopatra. Their marriage causes great distress to Antony's lover, Cleopatra.
- Octavius Caesar (hist) is one of the Triumvirs, the three rulers of Rome after Caesar's death, in Julius Caesar and Antony and Cleopatra.
- Officer:
  - First Officer attends the Venetian Senate in Othello.
  - An officer arrests Antipholus of Ephesus for debt in The Comedy of Errors.
  - Two officers in Orsino's service arrest Antonio in Twelfth Night.
  - Two officers discuss Coriolanus' prospects of becoming consul in Coriolanus.
  - Two officers, of whom only Second Officer is a speaking role, appear in the last act of King Lear.
  - Several officers support the Mayor of London in Henry VI, Part 1. One of them reads a proclamation.
- Old:
  - An Old Athenian objects to his daughter's involvement with Lucilius, until Timon offers to endow Lucilius with money to make him her equal, in Timon of Athens.
  - Old Capulet is a minor character – a kinsman of Capulet – in the party scene of Romeo and Juliet.
  - Old Clifford (hist), father of Clifford, is a Lancastrian leader in Henry VI, Part 2.
  - Old Gobbo, the blind old father of Launcelot Gobbo, is a clown in The Merchant of Venice.
  - Old Hamlet (myth) is the father of the title character in Hamlet. His ghost appears to exhort Hamlet to revenge Old Hamlet's murder by Claudius.
  - An Old Lady (fict) is a rather worldly friend of Anne Bullen, in Henry VIII.
  - An Old Man is Gloucester's tenant, who helps with his escape, in King Lear.
  - An Old Man reports the supernatural happenings on the night of Duncan's murder to Ross, in Macbeth.
  - Old Shepherd is the kindly father of the Clown in The Winter's Tale, who adopts the abandoned Perdita as his daughter.
- Oliver:
  - Oliver begins As You Like It as a villain: the cruel older brother to Orlando. He later repents, and marries Celia.
  - Sir Oliver Martext is a foolish priest in As You Like It.
- Olivia is a countess, loved by Orsino but in love with Cesario (the male persona of Viola) in Twelfth Night.
- One is the speech prefix of a very minor character who speaks to the Porter from offstage, in Henry VIII.
- Ophelia, in Hamlet, is a former lover of Hamlet, who is rejected by him, and who goes mad following her father's death at Hamlet's hands. She drowns, possibly a suicide.
- Orlando is the male romantic lead in As You Like It.
- Orleans:
  - The Bastard of Orleans (hist) is one of the French leaders in Henry VI, Part 1.
  - The Duke of Orleans (hist) fights on the French side in Henry V.
  - The Master Gunner of Orleans leaves his boy in charge of the artillery, in Henry VI, Part 1.
- Orsino is the Duke of Illyria, loved by Viola but in love with Olivia, in Twelfth Night.
- Osric is a courtier, treated with contempt by Hamlet in Hamlet.
- Oswald is a servant of Gonerill, most noted for getting into fights and losing them, in King Lear.
- Othello is the title character of Othello. A Moorish general in the Venetian army, he is persuaded by Iago that his wife Desdemona is having an affair with Michael Cassio.
- Some Outlaws, three of which are speaking roles, initially try to rob Valentine, but decide to invite him to be their leader, in The Two Gentlemen of Verona.
- Mistress Overdone is a brothel keeper in Measure for Measure.
- Owen Glendower (hist), a warrior and magician who tries the patience of Hotspur, leads the Welsh forces in the rebellion in Henry IV, Part 1.
- The Earl of Oxford (hist) is a staunch Lancastrian, supporting Henry in Henry VI, Part 3, and Richmond in Richard III.

== P ==
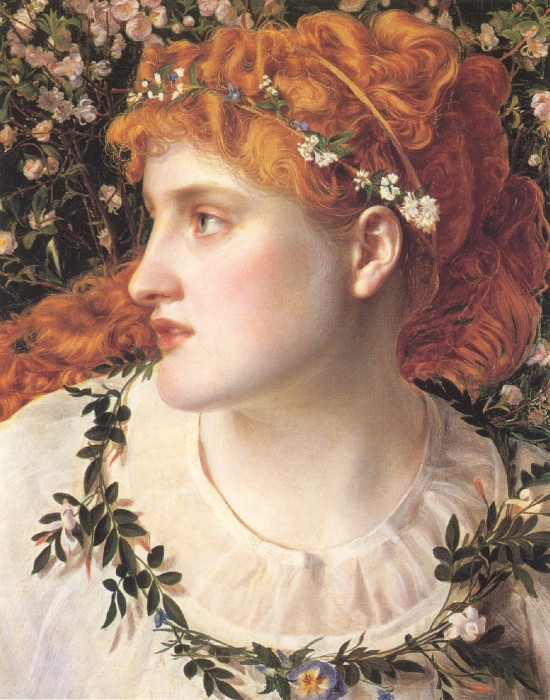
Perdita by Anthony Frederick Augustus Sandys

- Page:
  - A page (fict) procures the services of Tyrrell for King Richard in Richard III.
  - A page pretends to be Christopher Sly's lady, in the induction to The Taming of the Shrew.
  - A page to Paris witnesses the start of the conflict between Romeo and Paris, and summons watchmen to the scene, in Romeo and Juliet.
  - A page to the Countess of Rousillion is a very minor role in All's Well That Ends Well.
  - A page appears briefly in Timon of Athens.
  - Two pages encounter Touchstone, and sing It Was A Lover And His Lass, in As You Like It.
  - Anne Page is the daughter of Master and Mistress Page in The Merry Wives of Windsor. She loves Fenton, but her father wishes her to marry Slender and her mother wishes her to marry Caius.
  - Gardiner's Page is a minor role in Henry VIII.
  - Master Page is the husband of Mistress Page and the father of Anne and William in The Merry Wives of Windsor. He plans to have Anne married to Slender.
  - Mistress Page, wife of Master Page, is a title character in The Merry Wives of Windsor. She conspires with Mistress Ford to punish Falstaff's lechery. She plans to have Anne married to Doctor Caius.
  - William Page is a minor youthful comic character, the son of Master and Mistress Page, and the younger brother of Anne Page in The Merry Wives of Windsor.
  - See also The Boy, who is sometimes "the page" or "Falstaff's page".
- A Painter and a Poet obtain the patronage of Timon in Timon of Athens. They return to him, in the woods, having heard rumours that he has found gold.
- Palamon and Arcite are the title characters of The Two Noble Kinsmen. Their friendship endures even though they engage in a mortal quarrel for the love of Emilia.
- Pandarus (myth) procures an assignation between his niece Cressida and the prince Troilus, in Troilus and Cressida.
- A Pander and a Bawd run the brothel into which Marina is sold, in Pericles, Prince of Tyre.
- Cardinal Pandulph (hist) is the Papal legate in King John. He incites the Dauphin against John, but later tries to placate him.
- Panthino is a servant of Antonio in The Two Gentlemen of Verona.
- Paris:
  - The Governor of Paris has an oath of allegiance administered to him by Gloucester (but has no lines of his own) in Henry VI, Part 1.
  - Paris (myth) has captured Helen – Menelaus' wife – and they live together as lovers in Troy. This is the cause of the lengthy wars fought in Troilus and Cressida.
  - Paris is a suitor to Juliet in Romeo and Juliet. He is killed by Romeo.
  - Paris' Servant has a clownish exchange with Pandarus in Troilus and Cressida.
  - For Paris' Page (in Romeo and Juliet), see Page.
- Parolles is a cowardly braggart soldier, a companion of Bertram, in All's Well That Ends Well.
- For Parson Hugh see Sir Hugh Evans.
- Patience (fict) is an attendant on Katherine, in Henry VIII.
- The Roman Patricians, of whom only one has individual lines, appear in Coriolanus.
- Patroclus (myth) is the friend, or "masculine whore", of Achilles in Troilus and Cressida.
- Paulina, strong-willed and good-hearted, is an important foil to Leontes in The Winter's Tale. In the last act, she reveals the statue of Hermione.
- Peaseblossom is a fairy in A Midsummer Night's Dream.
- The Pedant disguises himself as Vincentio (Lucentio's father) in The Taming of the Shrew, to act as father to Tranio, who has disguised himself as Lucentio.
- Don Pedro is the prince of Arragon in Much Ado About Nothing.
- Pembroke:
  - The Earl of Pembroke (hist), together with Salisbury and Bigot, fear for the life of young Arthur, and later discover his body, in King John.
  - The Earl of Pembroke (hist) is a non-speaking Yorkist in Henry VI, Part 3.
- Percy:
  - The Earl of Northumberland, Henry Percy, (hist) is an important character in Richard II, where he is Bolingbroke's chief ally, and in Henry IV, Part 1 and Henry IV, Part 2, in which he leads the rebellion against his former ally, who is now king.
  - Hotspur or Harry Percy (hist), brave and chivalrous but hot-headed and sometimes comical, is an important foil to Hal, and leader of the rebel forces, in Henry IV, Part 1.
  - Lady Percy (hist) (sometimes called Kate) is Hotspur's wife, later his widow, in Henry IV, Part 1 and Henry IV, Part 2.
  - For Thomas Percy, see Earl of Worcester.
  - See also Lady Northumberland.
- Perdita is the infant daughter of Leontes, abandoned in Bohemia, in The Winter's Tale. She grows up to marry Florizel and is reconciled to her father.
- Pericles is the central character of Pericles, Prince of Tyre. In an unfortunate series of adventures, he loses his wife and his daughter, but is eventually reunited with them.
- Peter:
  - Friar Peter assists Isabella and Mariana in the final act of Measure for Measure.
  - Peter is a servant of Petruchio in The Taming of the Shrew.
  - Peter is a clownish servant of Capulet who attends on the nurse in Romeo and Juliet.
  - Peter of Pomfret is a prophet in King John. John orders his hanging upon hearing he has predicted that John will yield up his crown.
  - Peter Quince is a carpenter in A Midsummer Night's Dream. He plays the prologue to Pyramus and Thisbe.
  - Peter Thump (fict) fights a duel with his master Thomas Horner in Henry VI, Part 2.
  - See also Simple, whose first name is Peter.
- Peto (fict) is a follower of Sir John Falstaff in Henry IV, Part 1 and Henry IV, Part 2.

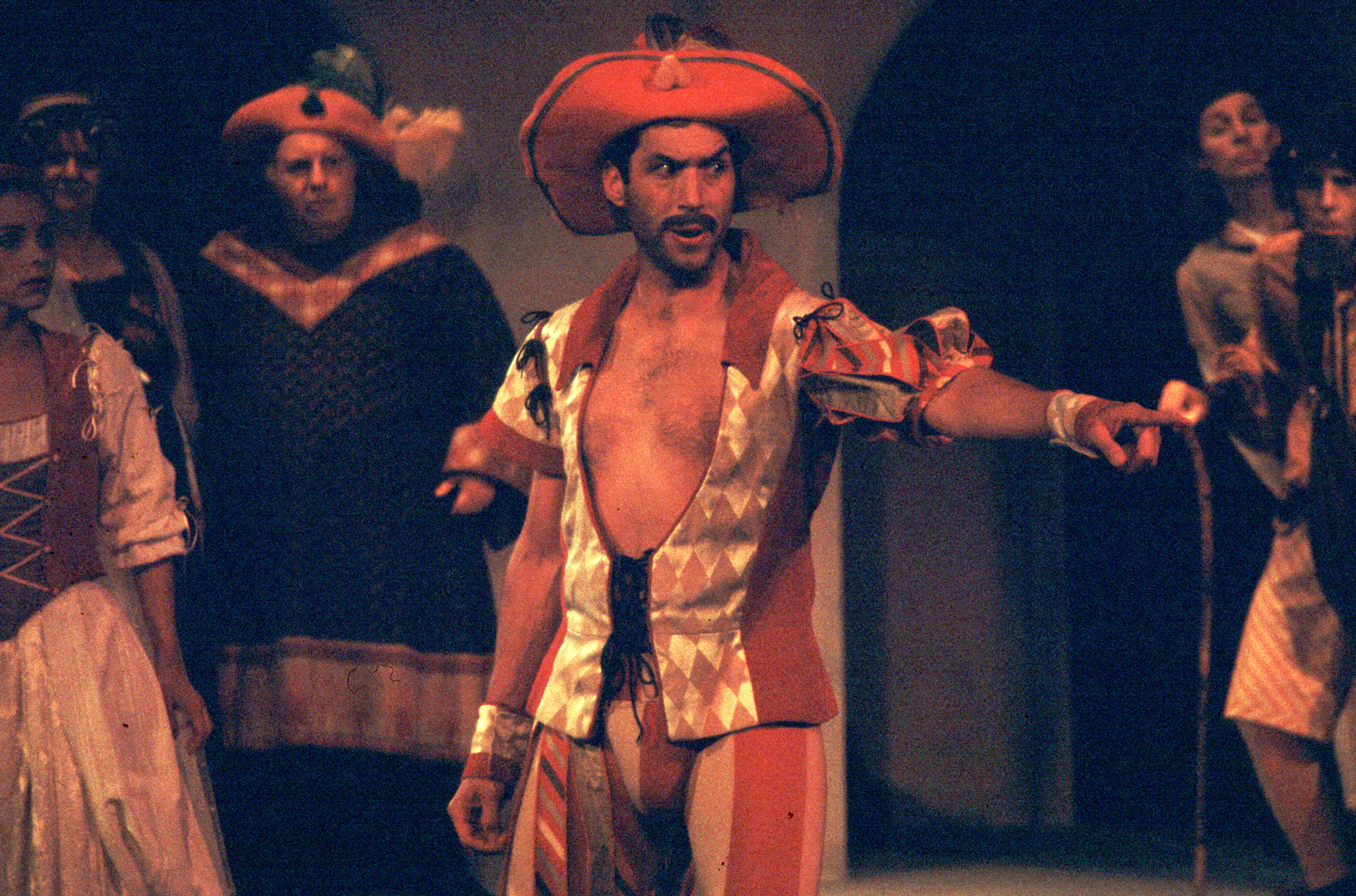
Petruchio (Kevin Black) in his wedding outfit, in a Carmel Shakespeare Festival production at the outdoor Forest Theater in Carmel, California, October 2003

- Petruchio is the central male character in The Taming of the Shrew, who "tames" the title character, Katherine.
- Philostrate is master of the revels to Theseus in A Midsummer Night's Dream.
- Phebe is a shepherdess, loved by Silvius but who falls in love with the disguised Rosalind, in As You Like It.
- Philario is an Italian friend of Posthumus, who introduces him to Jachimo, in Cymbeline.
- Philemon is a servant of Cerimon, in Pericles, Prince of Tyre.
- Philip:
  - King Philip of France (hist) allies himself with Constance in support of Arthur's claim, but later makes peace with John in King John.
  - Philip (the Bastard) Faulconbridge (fict) is a central character in King John, the bravest and most articulate of John's supporters.
  - Philip is a servant of Petruchio in The Taming of the Shrew.
- Philo and Demetrius, Romans following Antony, regret his infatuation with Cleopatra in Antony and Cleopatra.
- Philotus is a servant, sent to extract payment of a debt from Timon of Athens.
- Phrynia and Timandra are whores, or mistresses of Alcibiades, in Timon of Athens.
- Sir Piers of Exton (fict) murders the deposed King Richard in Richard II.
- Pinch is a conjuror in The Comedy of Errors.
- Pindarus is a servant of Cassius, in Julius Caesar. He aids Cassius' suicide, at Philippi.
- Three Pirates rescue Marina from Leonine, then sell her to a brothel at Mytilene, in Pericles, Prince of Tyre.
- Pirithous (myth) is a friend of Theseus, in The Two Noble Kinsmen.
- Pisanio, the servant of Posthumus, is ordered to murder Imogen, but instead spares her and disguises her as Fidele, in Cymbeline.
- Pistol (fict) is a follower of Sir John Falstaff in Henry IV, Part 2 and The Merry Wives of Windsor. He is married to Mistress Quickly, and is a soldier in conflict with Fluellen, in Henry V.
- Player:
  - First Player or Player King leads the company which visits Elsinore in Hamlet. He reads an excerpt as Priam, and plays the king in The Mousetrap.
  - Second Player or Player Queen, in Hamlet, plays the queen in The Mousetrap.
  - Third Player, in Hamlet, plays Lucianus in The Mousetrap.
  - Fourth Player, in Hamlet, reads the prologue to The Mousetrap.
  - A Player appears in the induction to The Taming of the Shrew.
  - A number of characters are players, including, in a sense, the whole cast (except for those in the induction) of The Taming of the Shrew.
- Plebeians:
  - A mob of Plebeians, four of them individual speaking roles, hear the funeral orations of Brutus and Antony, in Julius Caesar.
  - For Plebeians in Coriolanus, see Citizens.
- Poet:
  - A Poet and a Painter obtain the patronage of Timon in Timon of Athens. They return to him, in the woods, having heard rumours that he has found gold.
  - A Poet appears briefly in Julius Caesar, begging Brutus and Cassius to be friends.
  - See also Cinna the Poet.
- Ned Poins (fict) is a highwayman, and a close companion of Hal, in Henry IV, Part 1 and Henry IV, Part 2.
- The Duke of Suffolk (William de la Pole) (hist) is a manipulative character, loved by Queen Margaret, in Henry VI, Part 1 and Henry VI, Part 2.
- Polixines is the King of Bohemia in The Winter's Tale. Leontes wrongly believes that Polixines and Hermione are having an affair.
- Polonius is a chief adviser in the court of King Claudius in Hamlet, and is the father of Ophelia and Laertes. He is killed by Hamlet, who stabs him through an arras while he is eavesdropping on a conversation between Hamlet and Gertrude.
- Polydore (real name Guiderius) is the true heir in Cymbeline, stolen away in infancy by Morgan, and brought up as Morgan's child.
- Peter of Pomfret is a prophet in King John. John orders his hanging upon hearing he has predicted that John will yield up his crown.
- Pompey:
  - Pompey is a clown, servant to Mistress Overdone in Measure for Measure.
  - Pompey or Sextus Pompeius (hist) is the enemy of the Triumvirate in Antony and Cleopatra.
  - See also Costard, who plays Pompey in the masque of the Nine Worthies.
- For Poor Tom see Edgar.
- Popilius Lena, a senator, briefly frightens the conspirators into a belief that their plot may have been discovered, with his line "I wish your enterprise today might thrive", in Julius Caesar.
- Porter:
  - A Porter to the Countess of Auvergne locks the doors, believing that he has thereby made Talbot prisoner, in Henry VI, Part 1.
  - The Porter is a clown in Macbeth.
  - The banter of a Porter and a Porter's Man introduces the finale – Elizabeth's christening – in Henry VIII.
- Portia:
  - Portia is the central female character in The Merchant of Venice. She disguises herself as a lawyer in an attempt to thwart Shylock's attempt on Antonio's life.
  - Portia (hist) is the wife of Brutus in Julius Caesar.
- Posthumus Leonatus (usually just "Posthumus") is the exiled husband of Imogen, in Cymbeline. Persuaded she has been unfaithful, he orders Pisanio to kill her.
- For Potpan, see Servingmen.
- For Presenter see John Gower.
- Priam:
  - Priam (myth) is the king of Troy in Troilus and Cressida.
  - See also Player King.
- Priest:
  - A Priest converses briefly with Lord Hastings in Richard III.
  - A Priest presides over Ophelia's burial in Hamlet.
  - A Priest solemnises the marriage of Olivia and Sebastian in Twelfth Night.
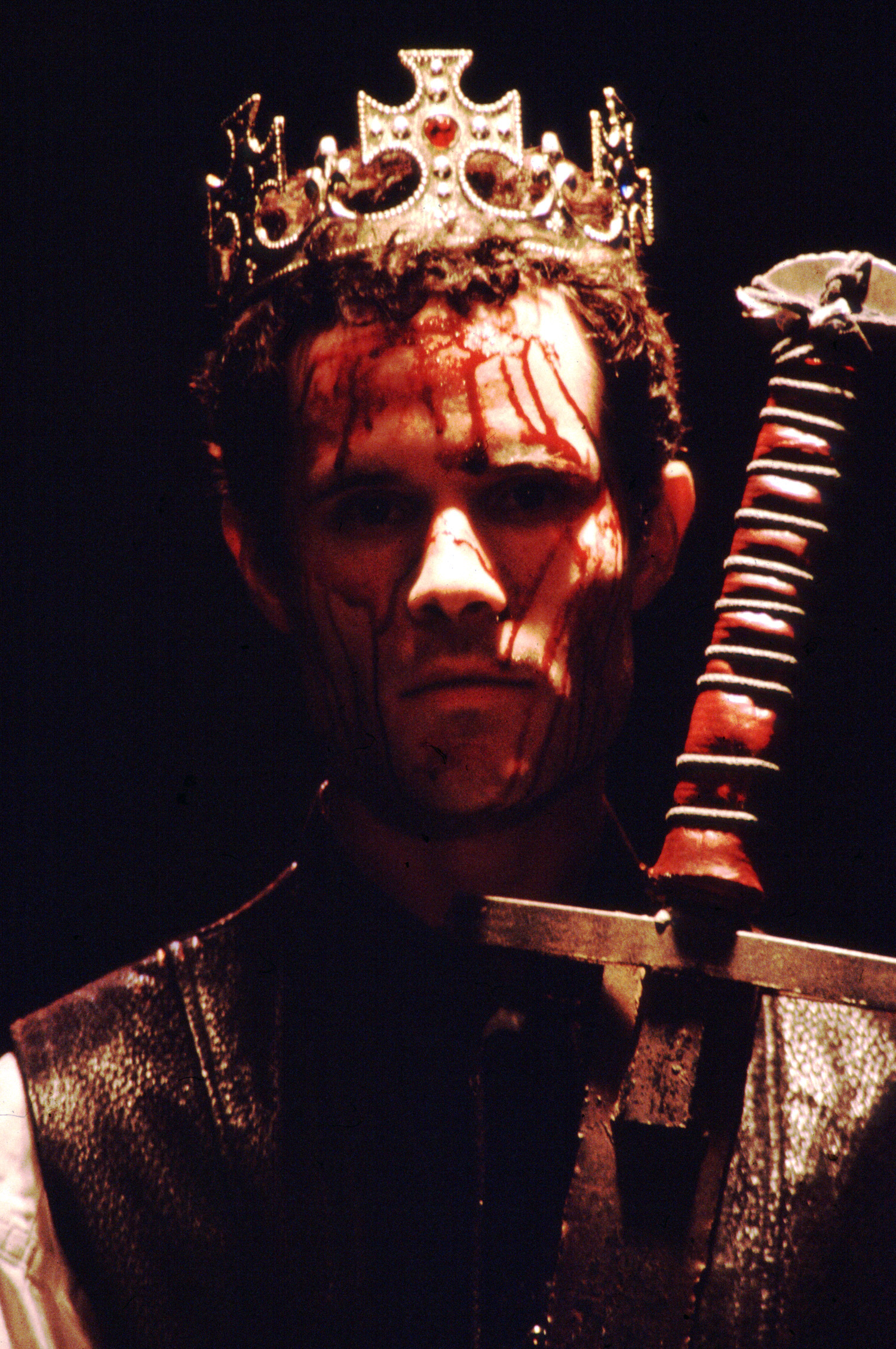
    Edward the Black Prince (David Mendolsohn) in the American Professional premiere of Edward III, staged by Pacific Repertory Theatre in August 2001.
- Prince (title):
  - Escalus, Prince of Verona tries to keep the peace between Montague and Capulet, in Romeo and Juliet.
  - Prince Edward:
    - Edward, the Black Prince (hist) the eldest son of King Edward III of England and Philippa of Hainault, and father to King Richard II of England. He appears in Edward III (play) and is referred to in Henry V.
    - Prince Edward (hist) is the son of Henry VI, who joins his mother Queen Margaret as a leader of the Lancastrian forces in Henry VI, Part 3. He is killed by the three Yorks (Edward, George and Richard).
    - Prince Edward of York later King Edward V (hist) is the eldest son of Edward IV and Queen Elizabeth. He appears in Henry VI, Part 3, and is the elder of the two princes in the tower in Richard III.
  - Prince Hamlet is the central character of Hamlet. He is a prince of Denmark, called on to avenge his father's (Old Hamlet's) murder by Claudius.
  - Prince Henry (hist) appears towards the end of King John, as successor to the title character.
  - Prince John of Lancaster (hist), the younger brother of Hal in Henry IV, Part 1, Henry IV, Part 2, and Henry V. He is also the Duke of Bedford who is Regent of France in Henry VI, Part 1.
  - The Prince of Arragon is an unsuccessful suitor to Portia in The Merchant of Venice.
  - The Prince of Morocco is an unsuccessful suitor to Portia in The Merchant of Venice.
  - For Prince of Tyre see Pericles.
  - For Prince of Wales see Hal, Prince Edward, Prince Edward of York.
  - Numerous characters are princes, either because they are rulers of principalities (for example Don Pedro and Pericles), or by descent from a king.
- Princess:
  - The Princess of France (hist) leads a diplomatic mission to Navarre and becomes romantically entangled with the King, in Love's Labour's Lost.
  - Several characters are princesses in the sense of being descendants of kings, including Katherine in Henry V, Queen Margaret (until she becomes queen), Imogen, Perdita, Gonerill, Regan and Cordelia. Others are described as princesses by virtue of being descendants of ruling dukes, including Rosalind, Celia, Silvia and Miranda. Others are princesses by descent from a ruling prince, for example Marina.
- Proculeius (hist) is a follower of Caesar in Antony and Cleopatra. It appears Antony has told Cleopatra to "trust him".
- Prologue:

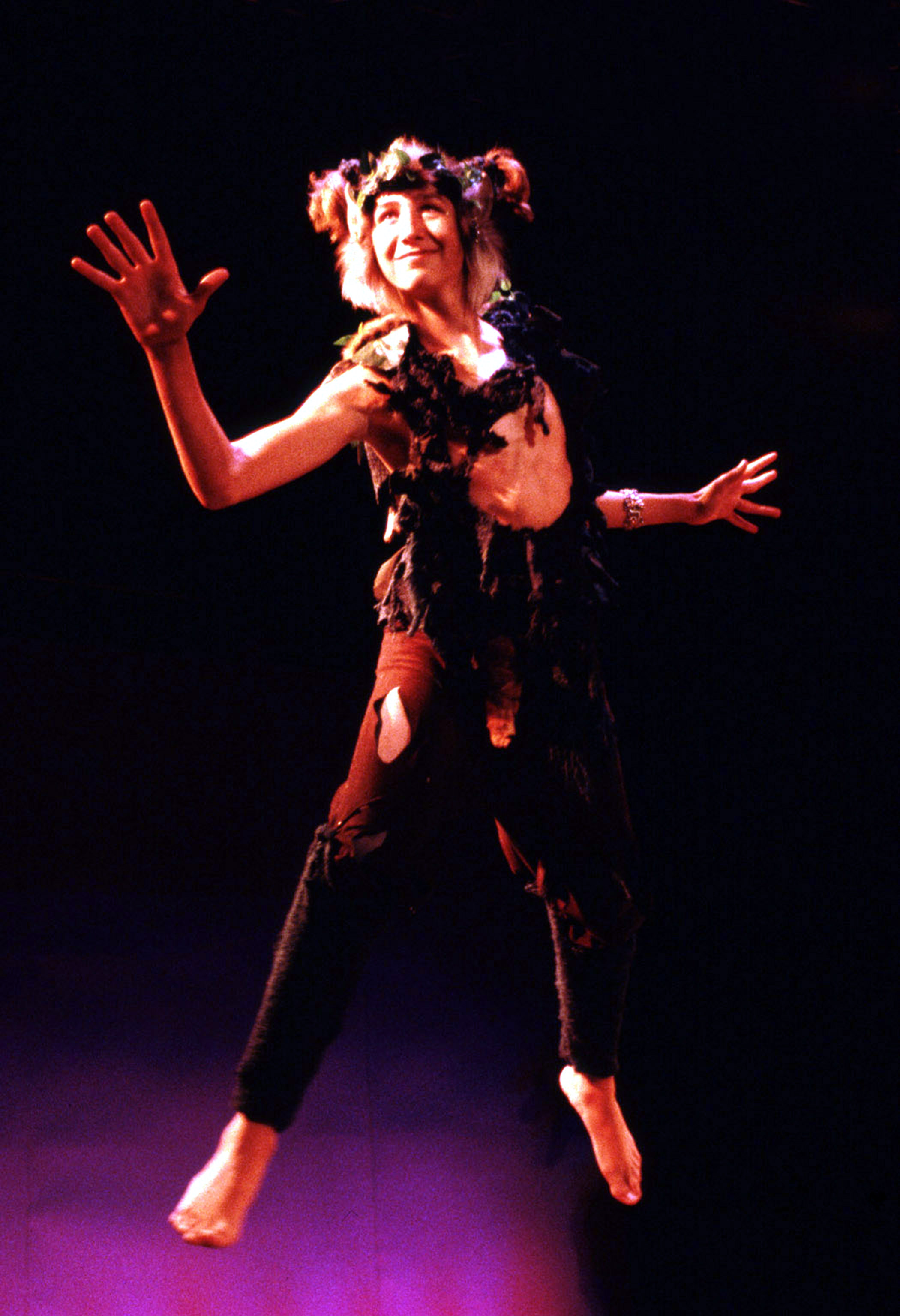
Vince Cardinale as "Puck" from the Carmel Shakespeare Festival production of A Midsummer Night's Dream, September 2000

  - A Prologue and an Epilogue (possibly the same player) appear in The Two Noble Kinsmen.
  - A Prologue and an Epilogue (possibly the same player) appear in Henry VIII.
  - A Prologue appears in Troilus and Cressida.
  - see Peter Quince.
  - see Fourth Player.
  - see also Chorus.
- Prospero is the central character of The Tempest, the wronged Duke of Milan, set adrift with his daughter Miranda, twelve years before the play begins. He has become a sorcerer and is lord of the enchanted island.
- Proteus is one of The Two Gentlemen of Verona. Originally in love with Julia, he proves unfaithful: coveting Silvia and eventually attempting to rape her.
- A Provost appears in Measure for Measure.
- Publius is a minor character: a senator accompanying Caesar to the Capitol, in Julius Caesar.
- Joan la Pucelle (hist), better known to history as Joan of Arc, leads the Dauphin's forces against Talbot and the English in Henry VI, Part 1.
- Puck (myth) is a mischievous (male) fairy, a servant of Oberon, in A Midsummer Night's Dream.
- Hastings Pursuivant is a minor character who meets his namesake, Lord Hastings, in Richard III.
- For Puzel see Joan la Pucelle.
- For Pyramus, see Nick Bottom.

== Q ==
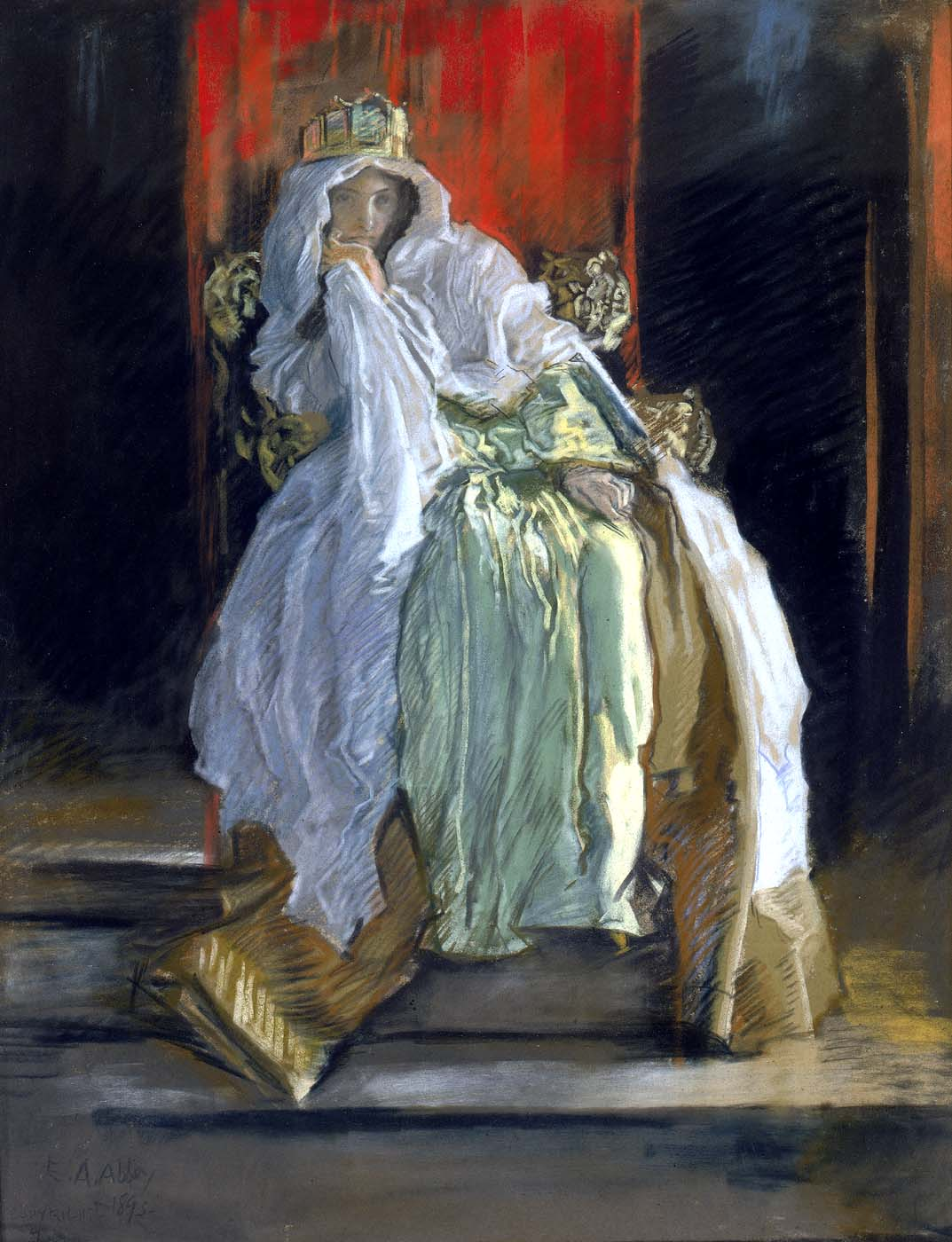
The Queen in "Hamlet" by Edwin Austin Abbey

- Queen (title):
  - Player Queen or Second Player, in Hamlet, plays the queen in The Mousetrap.
  - Queen, in Cymbeline, is the scheming wife of the title character, who attempts to manipulate events so that her son, Cloten, inherits the throne.
  - Three Queens, plead to Theseus to intercede with the tyrant Creon, who has killed their husbands in battle, in The Two Noble Kinsmen.
  - Queen Eleanor (hist) is the mother of John in King John. She takes a liking to Philip the Bastard, and recruits him to John's court.
  - Queen Elizabeth (hist) is a suitor to, and then queen to, Edward IV in Henry VI, Part 3 and Richard III. She is a major character in the later play, and a foil to Richard.
  - The Queen of France (hist) appears in the last act of Henry V.
  - Queen Gertrude is the protagonist's mother in Hamlet. She has married Claudius.
  - Queen (unnamed, a composite of the historical Anne of Bohemia and Isabella of Valois) is Richard's queen in Richard II, exiled upon his deposition.
  - Queen Katherine of Aragon (hist) is the first wife of King Henry in Henry VIII. She falls from grace, is divorced and dies.
  - Queen Margaret (hist) appears as a naive girl in Henry VI, Part 1 and as an embittered old woman in Richard III. She is a central character of the two intervening plays, Henry VI, Part 2 and Henry VI, Part 3, in which she is the wife of Henry VI, and a leader of his armies. In her most notable scene she supervises the murder/execution of Richard Duke of York.
  - Numerous characters are, or become, queens including Anne Bullen, Cleopatra, Cordelia, Hermione, Lady Anne, Lady Macbeth and Titania
- Mistress Quickly (fict) is an important character in Henry IV, Part 1, Henry IV, Part 2, Henry V, and The Merry Wives of Windsor. She is noted for her lewd malapropisms and double entendres. She is an innkeeper's wife (later his widow) in the Henry plays. She has a different personality, and a different relationship to other characters, in Merry Wives, where she is a servant to Doctor Caius. In Henry V (play) she marries Pistol and later dies of disease.
- Peter Quince is a carpenter in A Midsummer Night's Dream. He plays the prologue to Pyramus and Thisbe.
- Quintus and Martius, two sons of Titus Andronicus, have the same story: returning from the wars they sacrifice one of Tamora's sons. They defy their father over Saturninus' claim to the hand of Lavinia. They are framed and executed for Bassianus' murder.

== R ==
- Ragozine is a prisoner of the state of Vienna in Measure for Measure. He dies of a fever, and his head is sent to Angelo in place of Claudio's.
- Rambures (hist) is a French lord in Henry V.
- Sir Richard Ratcliffe (hist) is a confidant of Richard in Richard III.
- Several reapers dance in the masque in The Tempest.
- Hugh Rebeck, Simon Catling and James Soundpost are minor characters, musicians, in Romeo and Juliet.
- Regan is the cruel second daughter in King Lear. She is married to the Duke of Cornwall.
- Reignier (hist) is the impoverished king of Naples and Jerusalem, and father to Queen Margaret, in Henry VI, Part 1.
- Reynaldo is a minor character, an agent of Polonius, in Hamlet.
- Richard:
  - King Richard II (hist) is the title character of Richard II: a king who is deposed and eventually murdered.
  - Richard, Duke of Gloucester, later King Richard III (hist), brave but evil, is the third son of Richard, Duke of York (1). He is a fairly minor character in Henry VI, Part 2, is more prominent in Henry VI, Part 3, and is the titular antagonist in Richard III.
  - Richard, Duke of York (1) (hist) is a central character in Henry VI, Part 1, Henry VI, Part 2, and Henry VI, Part 3. He is the Yorkist claimant to the throne of England, in opposition to Henry VI, and he is eventually killed on the orders of Queen Margaret.
  - Richard, Duke of York (2) (hist) is the younger of the two Princes in the Tower, murdered on the orders of Richard in Richard III.
  - Sir Richard Ratcliffe (hist) is a confidant of Richard in Richard III.
  - Sir Richard Vernon is a follower of the rebel forces in Henry IV, Part 1.
  - See also Philip (the Bastard) Faulconbridge, who is renamed "Sir Richard" by the King in King John, and is often addressed as such.
- The Earl of Richmond, later King Henry VII (hist) leads the rebellion against the cruel rule of Richard III, and eventually succeeds him as king.
- Earl Rivers (hist), is the brother to Queen Elizabeth in Richard III. He is arrested and executed on the orders of Richard and Buckingham.
- Robert:
  - Robert is a servingman of Mistress Ford: he carries Falstaff to Datchet Mead in a buck-basket, in The Merry Wives of Windsor.
  - Robert Faulconbridge (fict) is the legitimate brother of the bastard in King John. He inherits his father's property.
  - See also Justice Shallow, whose first name is Robert.
- Robin:
  - Robin Starveling is a tailor in A Midsummer Night's Dream. He plays "Moonshine" in Pyramus and Thisbe.
  - See The Boy (who is called Robin in The Merry Wives of Windsor).
  - See Puck (who is also called Robin Goodfellow).
- Roderigo is a gentleman suitor to Desdemona in Othello. He is gulled by Iago throughout the play, and eventually Iago murders him.
- Roman:
  - A Roman (named Ninacor) encounters the Volsce, Adrian, with news that Coriolanus is banished from Rome, in Coriolanus.
  - Three Romans, with pillage, appear briefly in Coriolanus.
  - See the other part of a character's title where "Roman" is used as an adjective (e.g. see "Captain" for "Roman Captain").
  - See also Citizen, which is Shakespeare's more usual description for unnamed Romans. Similarly, see Plebeians, Senators, Tribunes
- Romeo is a title character in Romeo and Juliet. The son of Montague, he falls in love with Juliet, the daughter of his father's enemy Capulet, with tragic results.
- Rosalind is the central character of As You Like It. She spends the bulk of the play in exile in the Forest of Arden disguised as a boy called Ganymede.
- Rosaline
  - Rosaline is lady attending on the Princess of France in Love's Labour's Lost. She becomes romantically entangled with Berowne.
  - "Rosaline" is who Romeo is initially in love with in "Romeo and Juliet" before falling for Juliet
  - See also Rosalind, who is sometimes addressed as Rosaline.
- Rosencrantz and Guildenstern are two former friends of the protagonist in Hamlet, invited to the Danish court to spy on him. They eventually accompany Hamlet towards England, but he escapes while they continue with the journey, to their deaths.
- Ross
  - Lord Ross (hist) is a supporter of Bolingbroke in Richard II.
  - Ross is a thane in Macbeth.
- Rousillon:
  - The Countess of Rousillon is Bertram's mother, and Helena's protector, in All's Well That Ends Well.
  - See also Bertram, who is Count of Rousillon.
- John Rugby is a servant to Caius in The Merry Wives of Windsor.
- Rumour is the prologue to Henry IV, Part 2.
- Rutland (hist) is the youngest son of Richard Duke of York (1), killed in battle while still a boy, by Clifford, in Henry VI, Part 3. (Historically Rutland was not the youngest of the four York brothers depicted in the plays. Shakespeare made him so using dramatic licence.)
  - For Rycas, see Countryman.
- Rynaldo is a steward to the Countess of Rousillion, in All's Well That Ends Well. He reveals to the countess that Helena loves Bertram.

== S ==
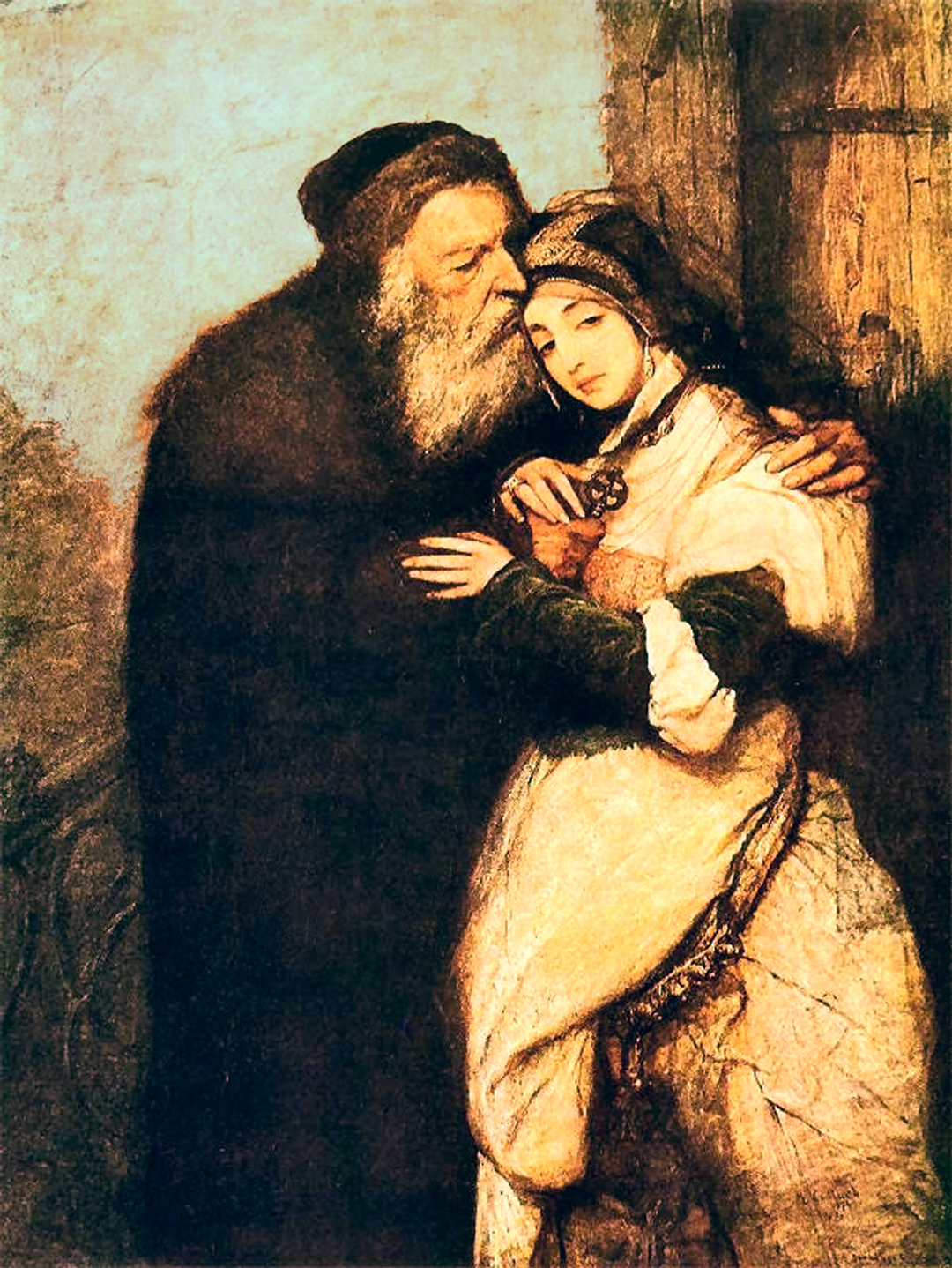
"Shylock and Jessica" by Maurycy Gottlieb (1856–1879)

- Sailors:
  - Several sailors, one of whom is a speaking role, deliver letters in Hamlet.
  - A sailor brings news of a Turkish fleet to the Venetian Senate, in Othello.
  - Two sailors appear in the storm scene of Pericles, Prince of Tyre, insisting that Thaisa's body be buried at sea, immediately.
  - A sailor of Tyre and a sailor of Mytilene, appear briefly in the shipboard reconciliation scene between Pericles and Marina in Pericles, Prince of Tyre.
  - Numerous characters are sailors (and see also Master, Boatswain, Captain). Also "sailors" is a common designation for supernumerary characters.
- Salarino is a friend of Solanio, Antonio, Bassanio, and Lorenzo in The Merchant of Venice.
- Salerio is a friend of Solanio, Antonio, Bassanio, and Lorenzo in The Merchant of Venice.
- Salisbury:
  - The Earl of Salisbury (hist) delivers bad news to Constance, in King John.
  - The Earl of Salisbury (hist) remains loyal to King Richard in Richard II.
  - The Earl of Salisbury (hist) fights for the king in Henry V. He is killed by the Master Gunner's Boy in Henry VI, Part 1.
  - The Earl of Salisbury (hist) supports the Yorkists in Henry VI, Part 2.
- Sampson and Gregory, two men of the Capulet household, open the main action of Romeo and Juliet with their aggressive and lecherous banter.
- Lord Sandys (pronounced "sands") (hist) is a courtier in Henry VIII.
- Saturninus becomes emperor of Rome, and marries Tamora, in Titus Andronicus.
- Lord Saye (hist) is an enemy of Jack Cade, killed by the rebels, in Henry VI, Part 2.
- Lord Scales (hist) is an enemy of Jack Cade's rebels in Henry VI, Part 2.
- Scarus (hist?) is a follower of Antony in Antony and Cleopatra. He reports Antony's retreat to Enobarbus.
- Schoolmaster:
  - A Schoolmaster acts as ambassador from Antony to Caesar, in Antony and Cleopatra.
  - See also Gerald.
  - A number of characters are schoolmasters, including Holofernes and Sir Hugh Evans.
- A Scottish Doctor witnesses Lady Macbeth sleepwalking in Macbeth.
- A scout of the French army reports that the English army has regrouped and is ready to attack, in Henry VI, Part 1.
- A scribe to the court, and a crier to the court, are minor roles – but they usually have dramatic impact – in the trial scene of Henry VIII.
- A scrivener (fict) explains the hypocrisy of Lord Hastings' indictment, in Richard III.
- Scroop:
  - Lord Scroop (hist) is one of the three conspirators against the king's life (with Cambridge and Grey) in Henry V.
  - Scroop (hist) supports Richard in Richard II.
  - See also Archbishop of York.
- George Seacoal is a member of the Watch in Much Ado About Nothing.
- Sebastian:
  - Sebastian is the twin brother of Viola in Twelfth Night. He is often mistaken for her male persona, Cesario, and Olivia marries him under that misapprehension.
  - Sebastian is the brother of Alonso in The Tempest. He conspires with Antonio to murder Alonzo and Gonzalo.
  - See also Julia in The Two Gentlemen of Verona, who calls herself Sebastian in her male disguise.
- For "Second...", see entries under the rest of the character's designation (e.g. Murderer for Second Murderer, Player for Second Player, etc.).
- A Secretary to Cardinal Wolsey is a minor role in Henry VIII: he has prepared Buckingham's Surveyor's examination.
- Seleucus is Cleopatra's treasurer, in Antony and Cleopatra.
- Sempronius:
  - Sempronius is a lord in Timon of Athens, who flatters Titus but proves a false friend.
  - Sempronius, Caius and Valentine are minor characters, kinsmen and supporters of Titus, in Titus Andronicus.
- Senator:
  - Several Senators, two of which are speaking roles, hear Brabantio's complaint against Othello, in Othello.
  - At least four Senators, or more (depending upon if and how they are doubled) appear in Timon of Athens:
    - A Senator is a creditor of Timon, and sends Caphis to collect the debt.
    - Three Senators anger Alcibiades by insisting upon a death sentence for his friend.
    - Two Senators visit Timon in the woods, begging his assistance for Athens.
    - Two further Senators hear of the failure of the previous two Senators' approach to Timon.
    - Two Senators negotiate Athens' surrender to Alcibiades.
    - Senators are also supernumerary characters at Timon's second feast.
  - The Roman Senators, two of them speaking roles, appear in Coriolanus, both as friends and enemies to the title character.
  - Two Senators and a Tribune discuss the prospects of their impending war with the Britons, in Cymbeline.
  - Many major characters in the Roman plays are Senators.
  - Senators are often supernumerary characters in the Roman and Venetian plays.
- Duke Senior is the father of Rosalind. He is the true duke, and has been usurped by his brother, Duke Frederick at the start of As You Like It.
- For Sennois, see Countryman.
- Two Sentinels, one a speaking role, appear with a Sergeant on the walls of Orleans, in Henry VI, Part 1.
- A Sentry and the Watch (two of whom are minor speaking roles) witness the death of Enobarbus, in Antony and Cleopatra.
- A French Sergeant appears with two Sentinels on the walls of Orleans, in Henry VI, Part 1.
- A Sergeant-at-Arms accompanies Brandon in the arrest of Buckingham, in Henry VIII.
- Servant:
  - Diomedes' Servant is sent with a message to Cressida, in Troilus and Cressida.
  - Paris' Servant has a clownish exchange with Pandarus in Troilus and Cressida.
  - A servant (who Shakespeare may have intended to be the same character as "Peter") needs the help of Romeo and Benvolio to read the guest list for Capulet's party, in Romeo and Juliet.
  - A servant to the Lord Chief Justice is abused by Falstaff in Henry IV, Part 2.
  - A servant to Olivia is a minor character in Twelfth Night.
  - A servant to Cardinal Wolsey is a minor character in Henry VIII. He announces the arrival of the disguised king and his followers to Wolsey's party.
  - Two servants (fict) of Piers of Exton are sounding-boards for his plan to murder Richard, in Richard II.
  - Two servants (plus a third named Philemon) follow Lord Cerimon, in Pericles, Prince of Tyre.
  - Three unnamed servants appear in King Lear, including one who dies killing the cruel Duke of Cornwall.
  - Three unnamed servants appear in Julius Caesar:
    - A servant of Caesar is sent to bid the priests do present sacrifice, on the morning of the ides of March, and reports the ill-omen that the sacrificed beast had no heart.
    - A servant of Antony comes to the conspirators after the murder of Caesar, to discover whether it is safe for his master to meet them.
    - A servant of Octavius carries messages between Octavius and Antony.
  - In Antony and Cleopatra:
    - A servant of Antony reports that Thidias has been soundly whipped.
    - A servant informs Cleopatra of the approach of a messenger from Caesar.
    - "Two or three" servants, two of them speaking roles, lay out a banquet for Pompey and the Triumvirs.
    - "Three or four" servants speak the unison line "The gods forbid!".
  - Numerous servants appear in Timon of Athens:
    - Isidore's Servant pursues his master's claim for money due from Timon. (Isidore is not a character.)
    - Lucius' Servant (at one point addressed as Lucius) is among the servants clamouring for payment of their master's debts in the second such scene, prompting Timon to announce his second feast.
    - Lucullus' Servant announces Flaminius' arrival at Lucullus' home, and provides wine.
    - Two of Varro's servants pursue their master's claim for money due from Timon. (Varro is not a character, although his first servant is at one point addressed as Varro.)
    - A servant to the First Lord reports that horses are ready, for Lords to leave Timon's first feast.
    - Three servants of Timon make announcements at Timon's first feast, and later – with Flavius – mourn for Timon's poverty, and the loss of their jobs.
    - A servant of Timon approaches Sempronius – unsuccessfully – with a request for funds for Timon.
    - Three of Timon's servants are named characters: Flaminius, Lucilius and Servilius. (See their separate entries.) They may, or may not, have been intended to be doubled with the un-named servants mentioned in the play.
    - The play may contain other supernumerary servants, depending upon how parts are doubled in performance.
    - See also Caphis, Hortensius, Philotus and Titus.
  - Talbot's Servant accompanies the dying Talbot, in Henry VI, Part 1.
  - For Troilus' Servants, see Boy and Man.
  - Numerous characters in the plays are servants. Also, "servant" is a common designation for supernumerary characters.
  - See also Servingman.
- Servilius is a servant of Timon of Athens, sent – unsuccessfully – to seek money for his master from Lucius.
- Servingman:
  - A servingman (fict) to the Duke of York brings news of the Duchess of Gloucester's death in Richard II.
  - Three servingmen to Aufidius discuss the arrival of their master's former arch-enemy as a guest in Coriolanus.
  - Four servingmen (two of them called "Anthony" and "Potpan") are minor speaking roles in the build-up to Capulet's party in Romeo and Juliet.
  - Numerous servingmen of Winchester and Gloucester (one of Gloucester's being a minor speaking role) brawl in Henry VI, Part 1.
  - Several servingmen of the Lord, three of whom are speaking roles, attend the hung-over Christopher Sly, trying to fool him into believing he is a lord, in the induction to The Taming of the Shrew.
  - Numerous characters in the plays are servingmen. Also, "servingman" is a common designation for supernumerary characters.
  - See also Servant.
- For Servitor, see Servant.
- A Sexton supervises Dogberry's inept examination of Conrade and Borachio, in Much Ado About Nothing.
- Pompey or Sextus Pompeius (hist) is the enemy of the Triumvirate in Antony and Cleopatra.
- Seyton is a servant in Macbeth.
- Seyward:
  - Seyward (hist) is the Earl of Northumberland in Macbeth.
  - Young Seyward (hist) is the son of the Earl of Northumberland in Macbeth.
- Shadow is pressed into military service by Falstaff in Henry IV, Part 2.
- Justice Shallow (fict) is an elderly landowner in Henry IV, Part 2 and The Merry Wives of Windsor.
- Shepherd:
  - Old Shepherd is the kindly father of the Clown in The Winter's Tale, who adopts the abandoned Perdita as his daughter.
  - A Shepherd says that he is Joan's father, but she disowns him, in Henry VI, Part 1.
  - A number of characters are shepherds or shepherdesses, including Corin, Dorcas, Mopsa and Silvius.
- Sheriff:
  - A Sheriff (hist) holds Eleanor in custody in Henry VI, Part 2.
  - A Sheriff of Wiltshire (fict) denies the condemned Buckingham access to King Richard, in Richard III.
- Shylock is a central character in The Merchant of Venice – a Jewish money-lender who claims a pound of Antonio's flesh.
- Sicilius Leonatus, father of Posthumus in Cymbeline, appears as a ghost, and pleads to Jupiter to resolve Posthumus' troubles.
- Sicinius Velutus and Junius Brutus, two of the tribunes of the people, are the protagonist's chief political enemies in Coriolanus, and prove more effective than his military foes.
- Justice Silence (fict) is an elderly friend of Justice Shallow in Henry IV, Part 2.
- Silius is a follower of Antony, in Antony and Cleopatra.
- Silvia is the faithful lover of Valentine, and the victim of an attempted rape by Proteus, in The Two Gentlemen of Verona.
- Silvius is a shepherd, in love with Phebe, in As You Like It.
- Simon Catling, Hugh Rebeck and James Soundpost are minor characters, musicians, in Romeo and Juliet.
- Simonides, king of Pentapolis in Pericles, Prince of Tyre, pretends to oppose the romance between his daughter Thaisa and the hero but in fact is delighted by it.
- Simpcox (fict) claims to have been cured of blindness in Henry VI, Part 2.
- Simpcox's Wife is the wife of Simpcox in Henry VI, Part 2.
- Simple is a servant to Slender in The Merry Wives of Windsor.
- For Siward see Seyward.
- Abraham Slender is a foolish suitor to Anne, and a kinsman of Shallow, in The Merry Wives of Windsor.
- Christopher Sly is a drunken tinker in the induction to The Taming of the Shrew. He is gulled into believing he is a lord.
- Smith the Weaver (fict) is a follower of Jack Cade in Henry VI, Part 2.
- Snare is a constable in Henry IV, Part 2.
- Tom Snout is a tinker in A Midsummer Night's Dream. He plays "Wall" in Pyramus and Thisbe.
- Snug is a joiner in A Midsummer Night's Dream. He plays the lion in Pyramus and Thisbe.
- Solanio is a friend and counterpart of Salerio in The Merchant of Venice.
- Soldier:
  - A soldier discovers that Timon has died, and reports this to the senators, in Timon of Athens.
  - An English soldier (fict) achieves some plunder at the siege of Orleans "using no other weapon but [Talbot's] name", in Henry VI, Part 1.
  - Several soldiers, of whom "first soldier" is an important speaking role and "second soldier" a minor speaking role, take part in the capture and mock-interrogation of Parolles, in All's Well That Ends Well.
  - Two of Coriolanus' soldiers, and one of Aufidius' soldiers, have minor speaking roles in Coriolanus.
  - Two soldiers of Antony's party capture Lucilius, believing him to be Brutus, in Julius Caesar.
  - Three soldiers of Brutus' and Cassius' party each speak the one word "stand!" in Julius Caesar.
  - Four French soldiers (fict), one of them a speaking role, accompany Joan into Rouen disguised as peasants, in Henry VI, Part 1.
  - Several Soldiers have minor speaking roles in Antony and Cleopatra, including:
    - a soldier who discusses the progress of the war with Canidius;
    - four soldiers who hear the strange sound of hautboys beneath the stage;
    - a soldier who acts as a messenger to Antony;
    - a group of Antony's soldiers who share the unison line "Good morrow, General!";
    - one of Antony's soldiers who informs his leader that Enobarbus has deserted to follow Caesar; and
    - one of Caesar's soldiers who informs Enobarbus that Antony has sent Enobarbus his treasure.
  - Soldiers give the shout that Hector is slain by Achilles, in Troilus and Cressida.
  - "Soldiers" is a common designation for supernumerary characters.
- Solinus is the Duke of Ephesus in The Comedy of Errors.
- Somerset:
  - The Duke of Somerset (1) (hist) is a follower of King Henry in Henry VI, Part 1.
  - The Duke of Somerset (2) (hist) appears among the Lancastrian faction in Henry VI, Part 2. His head is carried onstage by Richard (later Richard III) in the opening scene of Henry VI, Part 3.
  - The Duke of Somerset (3) is a conflation by Shakespeare of two historical Dukes of Somerset (Henry Beaufort, 3rd Duke of Somerset and Edmund Beaufort, 4th Duke of Somerset). He supports both factions at different stages of Henry VI, Part 3.
- Somerville (fict) is a follower of Warwick in Henry VI, Part 3.
- Son:
  - Macduff's Son is murdered on Macbeth's orders.
  - A Son who has killed his father at the Battle of Towton appears in Henry VI, Part 3. See also Father.
- Soothsayer:
  - A Soothsayer wisely warns Caesar to beware the Ides of March, in Julius Caesar.
  - A Soothsayer attends on Lucius, and eventually interprets the book given to Posthumus by Jupiter, in Cymbeline.
  - A Soothsayer makes a number of predictions, all of which come true in their own way, in Antony and Cleopatra.
- James Soundpost, Simon Catling and Hugh Rebeck are minor characters, musicians, in Romeo and Juliet.
- Southwell (hist, with Hume, Jourdain and Bolingbroke, are the supernatural conspirators with Eleanor Duchess of Gloucester in Henry VI, Part 2.
- A Spaniard, a Frenchman and a Dutchman are guests of Philario, in Cymbeline.
- Speed is the slow-witted servant of Valentine, in The Two Gentlemen of Verona.
- A spirit is conjured by Jourdain, Southwell, Hume and Bolingbroke to answer Eleanor's questions, in Henry VI, Part 2.
- A number of sprites serve Prospero in The Tempest.
- The Mayor of St. Albans appears briefly in the "Simpcox" episode in Henry VI, Part 2.
- Robin Starveling is a tailor in A Midsummer Night's Dream. He plays "Moonshine" in Pyramus and Thisbe.
- Stafford:
  - Lord Stafford (hist) is a non-speaking Yorkist in Henry VI, Part 3.
  - Sir Humphrey Stafford (hist) is an enemy of Jack Cade in Henry VI, Part 2.
  - Stafford's Brother (hist) is an enemy of Jack Cade in Henry VI, Part 2.
- Stanley:
  - Lord Stanley, Earl of Derby (hist) is a military leader who ultimately reveals his loyalty to the Richmond faction, in spite of his son being a hostage to Richard, in Richard III.
  - Sir John Stanley supervises Eleanor's penance in Henry VI, Part 2.
  - Sir William Stanley (hist), the historical brother of Lord Stanley from Richard III, is a minor character of the Yorkist faction in Henry VI, Part 3.
- Stephano:
  - Stephano is a drunken butler in The Tempest. He conspires with Caliban and Trinculo to kill Prospero and become king of the island.
  - Stephano is a servant of Portia, in The Merchant of Venice.
- Steward:
  - For "Steward" in All's Well That Ends Well, see Rynaldo.
  - A number of characters are stewards, most notably Flavius, Malvolio and Philostrate.
- Three Strangers (one of them named Hostilius) witness Lucius' hypocrisy in claiming he would help Timon, but then failing to do so, in Timon of Athens.
- Strato is a servant of Brutus in Julius Caesar. He holds Brutus' sword, so that Brutus may kill himself by running onto it.
- Suffolk:
  - The Duke of Suffolk (hist) is a courtier, cynical about the King's relationship with Anne Bullen, in Henry VIII.
  - The Duke of Suffolk (William de la Pole) (hist) is a manipulative character, loved by Queen Margaret, in Henry VI, Part 1 and Henry VI, Part 2.
- Surrey:
  - The Duke of Surrey (hist) accuses Aumerle of plotting Woodstock's death in Richard II.
  - The Earl of Surrey is a supporter of the king in Henry IV, Part 2.
  - The Earl of Surrey (hist) is a son-in-law of Buckingham in Henry VIII.
- A Surveyor to the Duke of Buckingham gives evidence of his (alleged) treachery, in Henry VIII.
- Syracuse:
  - Antipholus of Syracuse, twin of Antipholus of Ephesus – with whom he is often confused, is a central character in The Comedy of Errors.
  - Dromio of Syracuse, servant to Antipholus of Syracuse and twin of Dromio of Ephesus – with whom he is often confused, is a central character in The Comedy of Errors.

== T ==
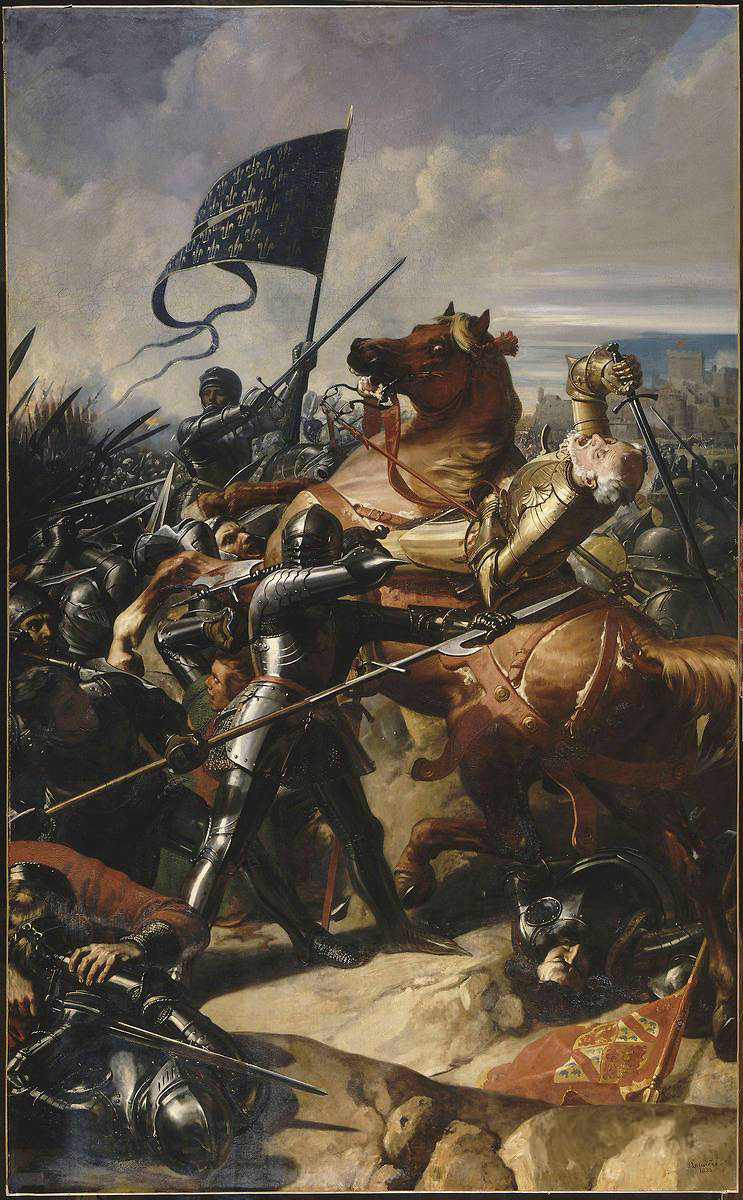
The death of Talbot, depicted in The Battle of Castillon by Charles-Philippe Larivière, 1839

- For Taborer, see Timothy.
- A Tailor is verbally abused by Petruchio in The Taming of the Shrew.
- Talbot:
  - John Talbot is the son of Sir John Talbot. They die together bravely in battle in Henry VI, Part 1.
  - Sir John Talbot (hist) is the leader of the English forces in France, and therefore the chief enemy of Joan, in Henry VI, Part 1.
  - Talbot's Servant accompanies the dying Talbot, in Henry VI, Part 1.
- Tamora is the evil queen of the Goths who marries Saturninus in Titus Andronicus.
- Taurus (hist) is a follower of Caesar in Antony and Cleopatra.
- Doll Tearsheet (fict) is a whore, who is emotionally involved with Falstaff, and is later arrested for murder in Henry IV, Part 2.
- Thaisa, the wife of the title character in Pericles, Prince of Tyre, is buried at sea, believed dead. However her coffin washes up on shore, she is revived by Cerimon, and she becomes a priestess at the temple of Diana.
- Thaliard is a lord of Antioch, ordered to kill Pericles, in Pericles, Prince of Tyre.
- For Thane see Macbeth, Banquo, Macduff, Lennox, Ross, Menteth, Angus and Cathness, all from Macbeth.
- Thersites is a clown, who serves firstly Ajax and later Achilles, in Troilus and Cressida.
- Theseus (myth) is the Duke of Athens in A Midsummer Night's Dream and The Two Noble Kinsmen.
- Thidias (hist) is a follower of Caesar in Antony and Cleopatra, sent with messages to Cleopatra and to Antony. Antony has him whipped before sending him back to his master.
- For "Third...", see entries under the rest of the character's designation (e.g. Murderer for Third Murderer, Player for Third Player, etc.).
- For Thisbe see Francis Flute.
- Thomas:
  - Friar Thomas leads an order of friars, and assists Vincentio to disguise himself as a friar, in Measure for Measure.
  - Sir Thomas Erpingham (hist) is an officer in the English army in Henry V.
  - Sir Thomas Grey (hist) is one of the three conspirators against the king's life (with Cambridge and Scroop) in Henry V.
  - Sir Thomas Lovell (hist) is a courtier of King Henry, in Henry VIII.
  - Sir Thomas Vaughan (hist) is executed, alongside Rivers and Grey, in Richard III.
  - Thomas Cranmer, Archbishop of Canterbury (hist) is a major character in the last act of Henry VIII: hauled before the privy council by his enemies and threatened with imprisonment, but protected by the king.
  - Thomas Cromwell (hist) is secretary to Wolsey, and later to the Privy Council, in Henry VIII.
  - Thomas, Duke of Clarence (hist) is Hal's younger brother, who appears in Henry IV, Part 2 and Henry V.
  - Thomas Horner (fict) fights a duel with his apprentice Peter Thump in Henry VI, Part 2.
  - Thomas Mowbray, Duke of Norfolk (hist) is Bolingbroke's enemy, exiled by Richard, in Richard II.
  - For Thomas Percy, see Earl of Worcester.
  - See also Tom.
- Peter Thump (fict) fights a duel with his master Thomas Horner in Henry VI, Part 2.
- Thurio is a cowardly suitor to Silvia (and therefore a rival of Valentine) in The Two Gentlemen of Verona.
- Timandra and Phrynia are whores, or mistresses of Alcibiades, in Timon of Athens.
- Time, personified, acts as a chorus in The Winter's Tale, bridging the sixteen-year gap between the third and fourth acts.
- Timon (hist) is the central character of Timon of Athens. His over-generosity leads him into poverty, and his friends abandon him.
- Timothy plays a tabor in the Maying ceremony in The Two Noble Kinsmen.
- Titania is Queen of the Fairies in A Midsummer Night's Dream. Under the influence of love in idleness, she falls in love with Bottom (with his ass's head).
- Titinius is a loyal follower of Cassius, in Julius Caesar. He kills himself with Cassius' sword, at Philippi.
- Titus:
  - Titus is a servant, sent to extract payment of a debt from Timon of Athens.
  - Titus Andronicus is the central character of Titus Andronicus. Broken and sent mad by Tamora and her followers, he eventually exacts his revenge by killing her sons, and cooking them for her to eat.
  - Titus Lartius and Cominius are leaders of the Roman forces against the Volscians in Coriolanus.
- Sir Toby Belch is a drunken knight, and kinsman to Olivia, in Twelfth Night.
- Tom:
  - Tom Snout is a tinker in A Midsummer Night's Dream. He plays "Wall" in Pyramus and Thisbe.
  - For Poor Tom see Edgar.
  - See also Thomas.
- For Sir Topas see Feste.
- Touchstone is a clown in As You Like It.
- Tranio is a servant to Lucentio in The Taming of the Shrew. He disguises himself as Lucentio, to enable Lucentio carry through his disguise.
- Travers (fict) is a messenger to the Earl of Northumberland in Henry IV, Part 2.
- Trebonius (hist) is one of the conspirators against Julius Caesar.
- Tressell and Berkeley (fict) are the two gentlemen accompanying Lady Anne, and Henry VI's coffin, in Richard III.
- Tribune:
  - A Tribune and two senators discuss the prospects of their impending war with the Britons, in Cymbeline.
  - Several characters are Tribunes, including Flavius and Marullus in Julius Caesar, and Sicinius and Brutus in Coriolanus.
- Trinculo is a clown, a friend to Stephano, in The Tempest.
- Troilus (myth) is a young Trojan prince who falls in love with Cressida during the Trojan War in Troilus and Cressida.
- Troy/Trojan:
  - For Sir Pandarus of Troy, see Pandarus.
  - For King of Troy see Priam.
  - Numerous characters in Troilus and Cressida are Trojans.
- Tubal is a wealthy Jew, a friend to Shylock, in The Merchant of Venice.
- Tullus Aufidius, leader of the Volscians, is the arch-enemy, and briefly the ally, of the title character in Coriolanus.
- A Tutor (fict) fails to save the life of his pupil, Rutland, in Henry VI, Part 3.
- Tybalt, cousin to Juliet, is a fiery-tempered character in Romeo and Juliet. He kills Mercutio, and is killed by Romeo.
- Sir James Tyrrell (hist) is employed to murder the princes in the tower in Richard III.

== U ==
- Ulysses (myth) is one of the Greek leaders in Troilus and Cressida.
- Ursula is a maid in Much Ado About Nothing.
- Christopher Urswick (hist) is a minor character: a priest acting as messenger for Lord Stanley, in Richard III.

== V ==
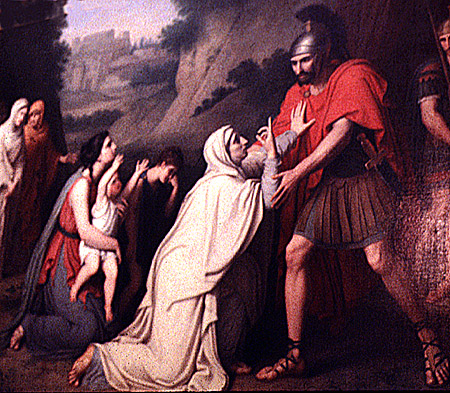
"Venturia [Shakespeare's Volumnia] at the Feet of Coriolanus" by Gaspare Landi.

- Valentine:
  - Valentine is one of The Two Gentlemen of Verona. He falls in love with Silvia, becomes exiled, and leads a band of robbers.
  - Valentine is an attendant on Orsino in Twelfth Night.
  - Valentine, Caius and Sempronius are minor characters, kinsmen and supporters of Titus, in Titus Andronicus.
  - Valentine is Mercutio's brother in Romeo and Juliet. He is mentioned as a guest of Lord Capulet's party.
- Valeria is a friend of Volumnia or Virgilia in Coriolanus. She brings news of Coriolanus' exploits.
- Valerius is a Thebean, a follower of Creon, who brings news of a forthcoming battle to The Two Noble Kinsmen.
- Varrius:
  - Varrius, a friend of the Duke, is a non-speaking role (although he is addressed by name, and therefore falls just short of being a ghost character) in Measure for Measure.
  - Varrius is a follower of Pompey in Antony and Cleopatra.
- Varro:
  - Varro and Claudius are guards in Brutus' tent, in Julius Caesar. They do not see Caesar's ghost.
  - For Varro's Servants, in Timon of Athens, see servant.
- Sir Thomas Vaughan (hist) is executed, alongside Rivers and Grey, in Richard III.
- Vaux:
  - Sir Nicholas Vaux (hist) is a minor character in the scene leading to Buckingham's execution, in Henry VIII.
  - Vaux (hist) is a minor character of the Lancastrian party in Henry VI, Part 2.
- Sicinius Velutus and Junius Brutus, two of the tribunes of the people, are the title character's chief political enemies in Coriolanus, and prove more effective than his military foes.
- Duke of Venice:
  - The Duke of Venice tries the case between Shylock and Antonio in The Merchant of Venice.
  - The Duke of Venice hears Brabantio's complaint against Othello.
- Ventidius:
  - Ventidius (hist) is a follower of Antony in Antony and Cleopatra.
  - Ventidius is bailed by Timon in Timon of Athens, then attends Timon's first feast offering to repay the debt, which Timon refuses. Later, however, he refuses Timon's request for funds.
- Verges, accompanied by Dogberry, is a clownish officer of the watch in Much Ado About Nothing.
- Vernon:
  - Sir Richard Vernon is a follower of the rebel forces in Henry IV, Part 1.
  - Vernon (fict) is a supporter of Richard, Duke of York (1) in Henry VI, Part 1.
- Escalus, Prince of Verona tries to keep the peace between Montague and Capulet, in Romeo and Juliet.
- For Duke of Vienna see Vincentio in Measure for Measure.
- Vincentio:
  - Vincentio, the Duke of Vienna, is a central character in Measure for Measure. Disguised as Friar Lodowick, he intrigues to achieve justice for Isabella and other virtuous characters.
  - Vincentio is the father of Lucentio in The Taming of the Shrew.
  - See also The Pedant, who falsely claims to be Vincentio in The Taming of the Shrew.
- A vintner (who may be the husband of Mistress Quickly) appears briefly in Henry IV, Part 1.
- Viola is the central character of Twelfth Night. She disguises herself as a boy and calls herself “Cesario”, to serve on Orsino's staff. Viola falls in love with Orsino, but Orsino is in love with Olivia, and Olivia falls in love with Cesario (Viola).
- Virgilia is the hero's wife in Coriolanus.
- Volsce/Volscian:
  - A Volsce (named Adrian) encounters the Roman, Ninacor, and hears the news that Coriolanus is banished from Rome in Coriolanus.
  - See the other part of a character's title where "Volsce" is used as an adjective (e.g. see "Lords" for "Volscian Lords").
- Voltemand and Cornelius are two ambassadors from Claudius to the Norwegian court, in Hamlet.
- Volumnia is Coriolanus' mother. She persuades him not to attack Rome, leading to his destruction, in Coriolanus.
- Volumnius (hist) is a friend and follower of Brutus in Julius Caesar. He refuses to assist Brutus' suicide.

== W ==
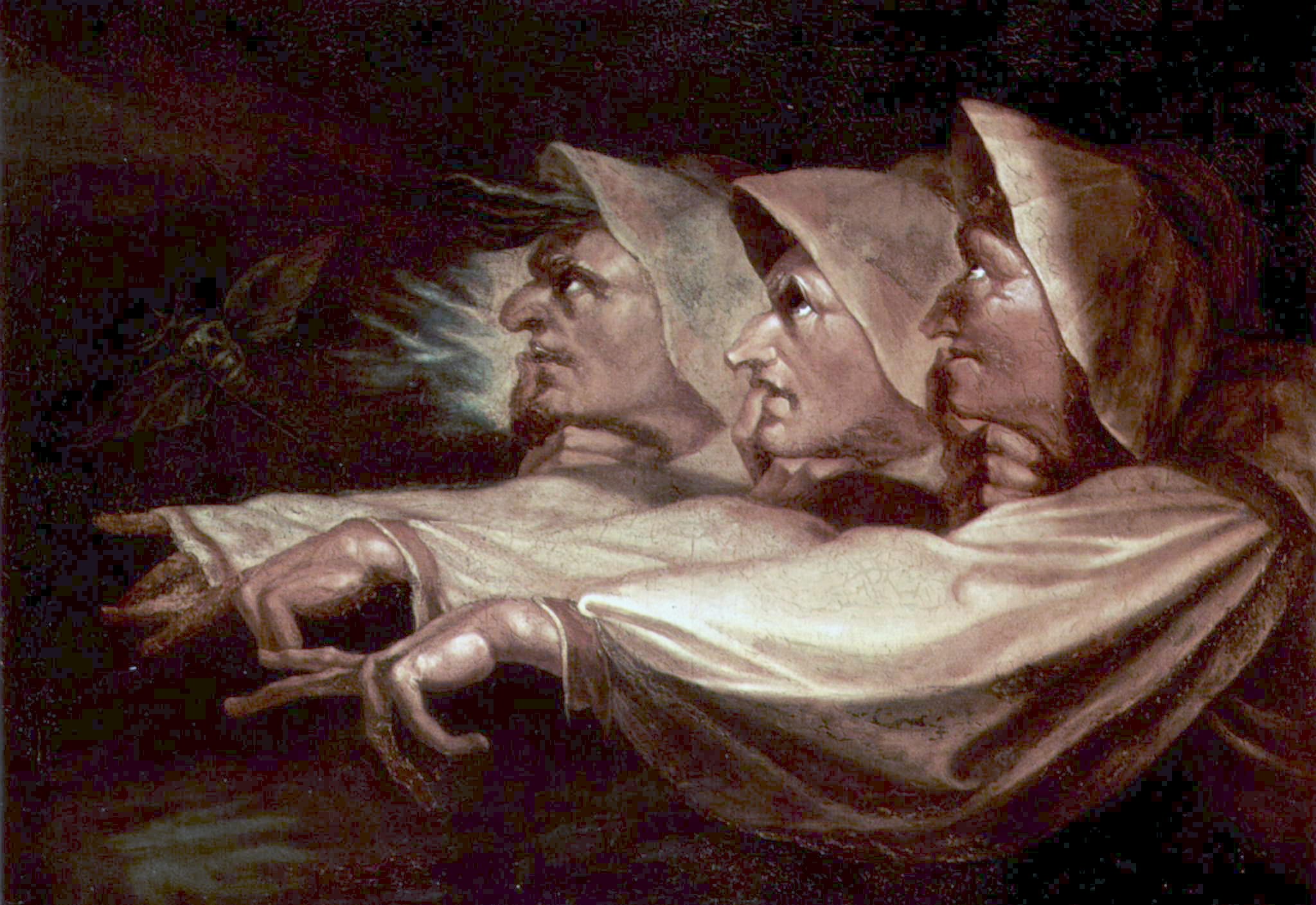
The Three Witches by Johann Heinrich Füssli.

- A Waiting Woman exchanges bawdy banter with Emilia, in The Two Noble Kinsmen.
- For Wall see Tom Snout.
- Walter:
  - Sir Walter Blunt is a soldier and messenger to the king in Henry IV, Part 1. He is killed by Douglas while wearing the king's armour.
  - Sir Walter Herbert is a follower of Richmond in Richard III.
  - Walter Whitmore (fict) kills Suffolk in Henry VI, Part 2.
- Two Warders of the Tower of London bar Gloucester's entrance: leading to a fight between Gloucester's men and Winchester's men, in Henry VI, Part 1.
- Wart is pressed into military service by Falstaff in Henry IV, Part 2.
- Earl of Warwick:
  - The Earl of Warwick (1) (hist) is a supporter of King Henry in Henry IV, Part 2.
  - The Earl of Warwick (2) (hist) is an important player in the Wars of the Roses, firstly for the Yorkist party, and then for the Lancastrians. He appears in Henry VI, Part 1, Henry VI, Part 2, and Henry VI, Part 3.
- Watch/Watchmen:
  - The Watch of the city of Rouen allows Joan and her soldiers, disguised, to enter the gates, in Henry VI, Part 1.
  - The Watch (two of whom are minor speaking roles), and a Sentry, witness the death of Enobarbus, in Antony and Cleopatra.
  - Three Watchmen guard King Edward IV's tent, in Henry VI, Part 3.
  - Several Watchmen, two of them speaking roles, serve under Dogberry and Verges, and apprehend Conrade and Borachio, in Much Ado About Nothing. Two of them are called Hugh Oatcake and George Seacoal.
  - Several Watchmen, three of them speaking roles, discover the carnage at Capulet's tomb, at the end of Romeo and Juliet.
  - Several Volscian Watchmen, two of them speaking roles, try to prevent Menenius meeting Coriolanus.
- Smith the Weaver (fict) is a follower of Jack Cade in Henry VI, Part 2.
- For Weird Sisters, see Witches.
- The Abbott of Westminster (fict) supports Richard and the Bishop of Carlisle in Richard II.
- Earl of Westmoreland:
  - The Earl of Westmoreland (1) (hist) is one of the leaders of the royal forces in Henry IV, Part 1, Henry IV, Part 2, and Henry V.
  - The Earl of Westmoreland (2) (hist) fights for King Henry in Henry VI, Part 3.
- Walter Whitmore (fict) kills Suffolk in Henry VI, Part 2.
- Widow:
  - A Widow, mother to Diana, provides lodgings to Helena in All's Well That Ends Well.
  - A Widow marries Hortensio, and behaves shrewishly in the final act of The Taming of the Shrew.
- Wife:
  - For Wife of Macduff, see Lady Macduff.
  - For the Merry Wives of Windsor, see Mistress Ford and Mistress Page.
- Will is a drawer in Henry IV, Part 2.
- William:
  - The Duke of Suffolk (William de la Pole) (hist) is a manipulative character, loved by Queen Margaret, in Henry VI, Part 1 and Henry VI, Part 2.
  - Sir William Lucy (fict) is a soldier and messenger for the English in France in Henry VI, Part 1.
  - Sir William Stanley (hist), the historical brother of Lord Stanley from Richard III, is a minor character of the Yorkist faction in Henry VI, Part 3.
  - William is a foolish youth, a suitor to Audrey, in As You Like It.
  - William Page is a minor youthful comic character, the son of Master and Mistress Page, and the younger brother of Anne Page in The Merry Wives of Windsor.
- Michael Williams (fict) (notably played by Michael Williams in Kenneth Branagh's film version) is a soldier who challenges the disguised Henry to a duel in Henry V.
- Willoughby (hist) is a supporter of Bolingbroke in Richard II.
- A Sheriff of Wiltshire (fict) denies the condemned Buckingham access to King Richard, in Richard III.
- Winchester:
  - The Bishop of Winchester (hist) (later "the Cardinal") is the chief enemy of Humphrey Duke of Gloucester in Henry VI, Part 1 and Henry VI, Part 2.
  - For The Bishop of Winchester in Henry VIII, see Gardiner.
- Three Witches initiate Macbeth's lust for the crown of Scotland in Macbeth.
- Cardinal Wolsey (hist) orchestrates the fall from grace of Buckingham and Katherine, but himself falls from grace and dies, in Henry VIII.
- For Woman (in The Two Noble Kinsmen) see Waiting Woman.
- Woodville:
  - Woodville (hist) is Lieutenant of the Tower of London in Henry VI, Part 1.
  - See also Queen Elizabeth, Rivers, Dorset and Grey, all of whom are of the Woodville clan.
- A Wooer of the Jailer's Daughter stays loyal to her throughout her madness, pretends to be Palamon in her presence, and after her cure, marries her, in The Two Noble Kinsmen.
- The Earl of Worcester (hist) is the brother of the Earl of Northumberland, and a leader of the rebel forces, in Henry IV, Part 1.

== Y ==
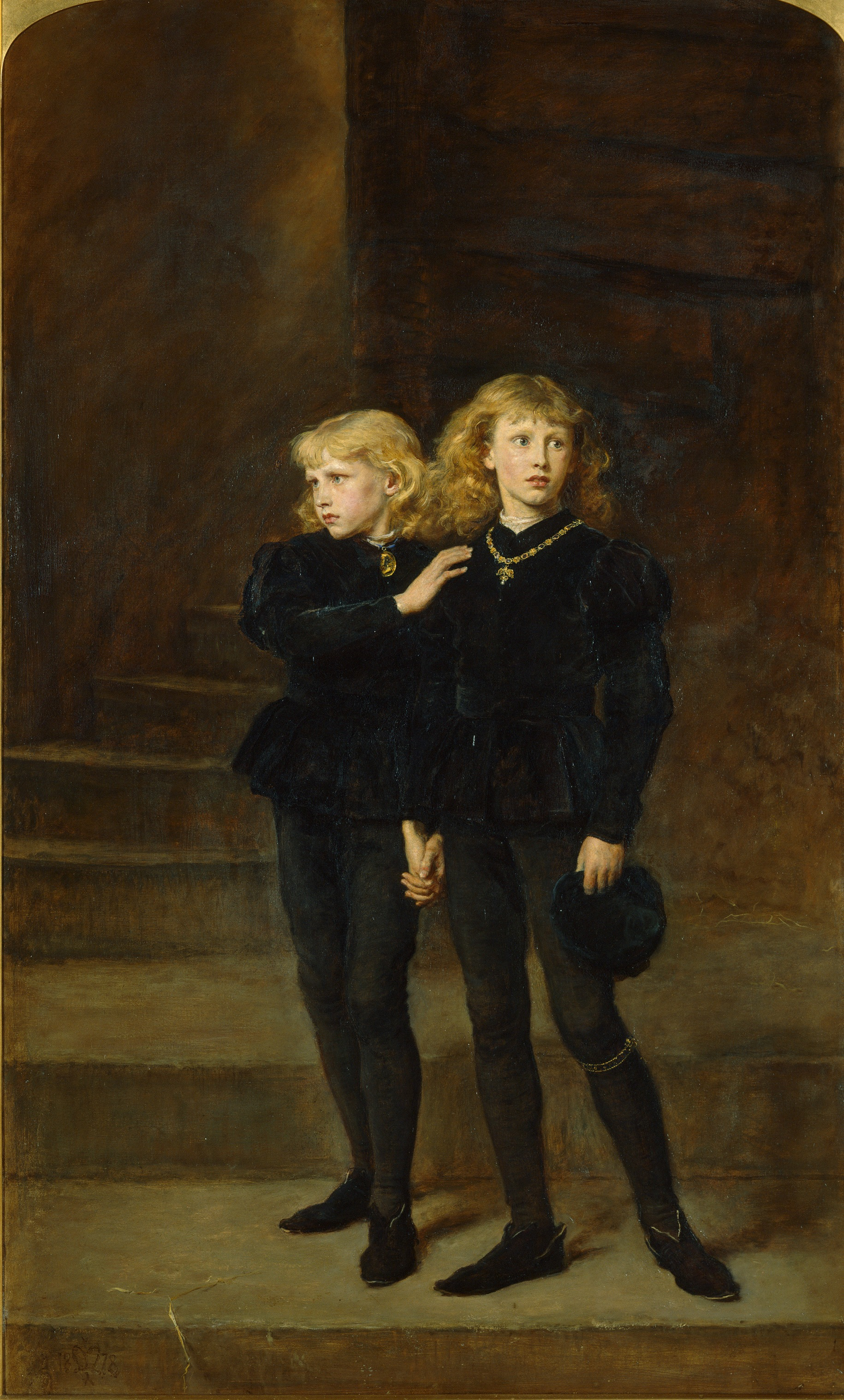
The Two Princes Edward and Richard in the Tower, 1483 by Sir John Everett Millais, 1878.

- Yorick: Yorick
- York:
  - Archbishop of York:
    - The Archbishop of York (1) (hist) is one of the rebel leaders in Henry IV, Part 1 and Henry IV, Part 2.
    - The Archbishop of York (2) (hist) assists Queen Elizabeth and the little Duke of York to obtain sanctuary in Richard III.
  - Duchess of York:
    - The Duchess of York (1) (unnamed) character in Richard II, a composite of Isabella of Castile, Duchess of York, died 1392, the mother of Aumerle, and Joan Holland, who bore no children
    - The Duchess of York (2) (hist) is the wife of Richard, Duke of York (1) in Henry VI, Part 3. She outlives him to mourn the death of two of their sons in Richard III.
  - Duke of York:
    - The Duke of York (1) (hist) is the uncle of both Richard and Bolingbroke, and the father of Aumerle, in Richard II.
    - The Duke of York (2) (hist) is a minor character, the leader of the "v award" in Henry V. (Historically, this character is the same person as Aumerle.)
    - Richard, Duke of York (1) (hist) is a central character in Henry VI, Part 1, Henry VI, Part 2, and Henry VI, Part 3. He is the Yorkist claimant to the throne of England, in opposition to Henry VI, and he is eventually killed on the orders of Queen Margaret.
    - Richard, Duke of York (2) (hist) is the younger of the two princes in the tower, murdered on the orders of Richard in Richard III.
  - The Mayor of York (hist) reluctantly supports the Yorkists in Henry VI, Part 3.
  - Prince Edward of York later King Edward V (hist) is the eldest son of Edward IV and Queen Elizabeth. He appears in Henry VI, Part 3, and is the elder of the two princes in the tower in Richard III.
  - See also Edmund Mortimer, Aumerle, Queen Elizabeth and Lady Anne, all of whom are "of the House of York" directly or through marriage.
- Young:
  - Young Cato is a soldier of Brutus' and Cassius' party, in Julius Caesar.
  - Young Lucius, son of Lucius in Titus Andronicus, and usually cast as a child, plays a part in exposing his aunt's rapists.
  - Young Seyward is the son of the Earl of Northumberland in Macbeth.
  - For Young Martius in Coriolanus, see Boy.
  - See also Clifford.

== See also ==
- List of Shakespearean characters (A–K)
