= A Midsummer Night's Dream (2016 film) =

2016 British television film

- Based on: A Midsummer Night's Dream by William Shakespeare
- Written by: Russell T Davies
- Directed by: David Kerr
- Composer: Murray Gold
- Country of origin: England
- Original language: English

Production
- Executive producers: Russell T Davies; Brian Minchin; Faith Penhale
- Producer: Nikki Wilson
- Cinematography: Dale McCready
- Editor: Philip Kloss
- Camera setup: Single-camera
- Running time: 1 hr 30 mins
- Production company: BBC

Original release
- Network: BBC One
- Release: 30 May 2016

A Midsummer Night's Dream is a 2016 British television film based on the William Shakespeare play A Midsummer Night's Dream. It was adapted by Russell T Davies, directed by David Kerr and produced by Nikki Wilson. It stars Maxine Peake as Titania, Matt Lucas as Bottom, John Hannah as Theseus and Nonso Anozie as Oberon. The film was first broadcast on 30 May 2016 on BBC One.

The film gained attention for its gay additions to the story, including a kiss between Hippolyta and Titania. Russell T Davies said, "I wanted to have a man with a man, a man who was dressed as a woman with a man, and a woman with a woman because it’s 2016, so that’s the world now."

The film received positive reviews. The Guardian called it "Doctor Who-ish but rather good" and said the ending "was infused with such a sense of sincere, undiluted joy that I found I had a lump in my throat". The Daily Telegraph gave it four out of five stars and said "Russell T Davies made Shakespeare engaging, fresh and funny".

== Cast ==
- Maxine Peake as Titania
- Nonso Anozie as Oberon
- Matt Lucas as Bottom
- John Hannah as Theseus
- Eleanor Matsuura as Hippolyta
- Hiran Abeysekera as Puck
- Prisca Bakare as Hermia
- Kate Kennedy as Helena
- Matthew Tennyson as Lysander
- Paapa Essiedu as Demetrius
- Elaine Paige as Mistress Quince
- Richard Wilson as Starveling
- Bernard Cribbins as Snout
- Javone Prince as Snug
- Fisayo Akinade as Flute
- Colin McFarlane as Egeus
- Elliot Levey as Philostrate
- Charlotte Dylan as Cobweb
- Varada Sethu as Peaseblossom
- Tia Benbow-Hart as Moth
- Marlene Madenge as Mustardseed
