= Hermia and Lysander (painting) =

1870 painting by John Simmons

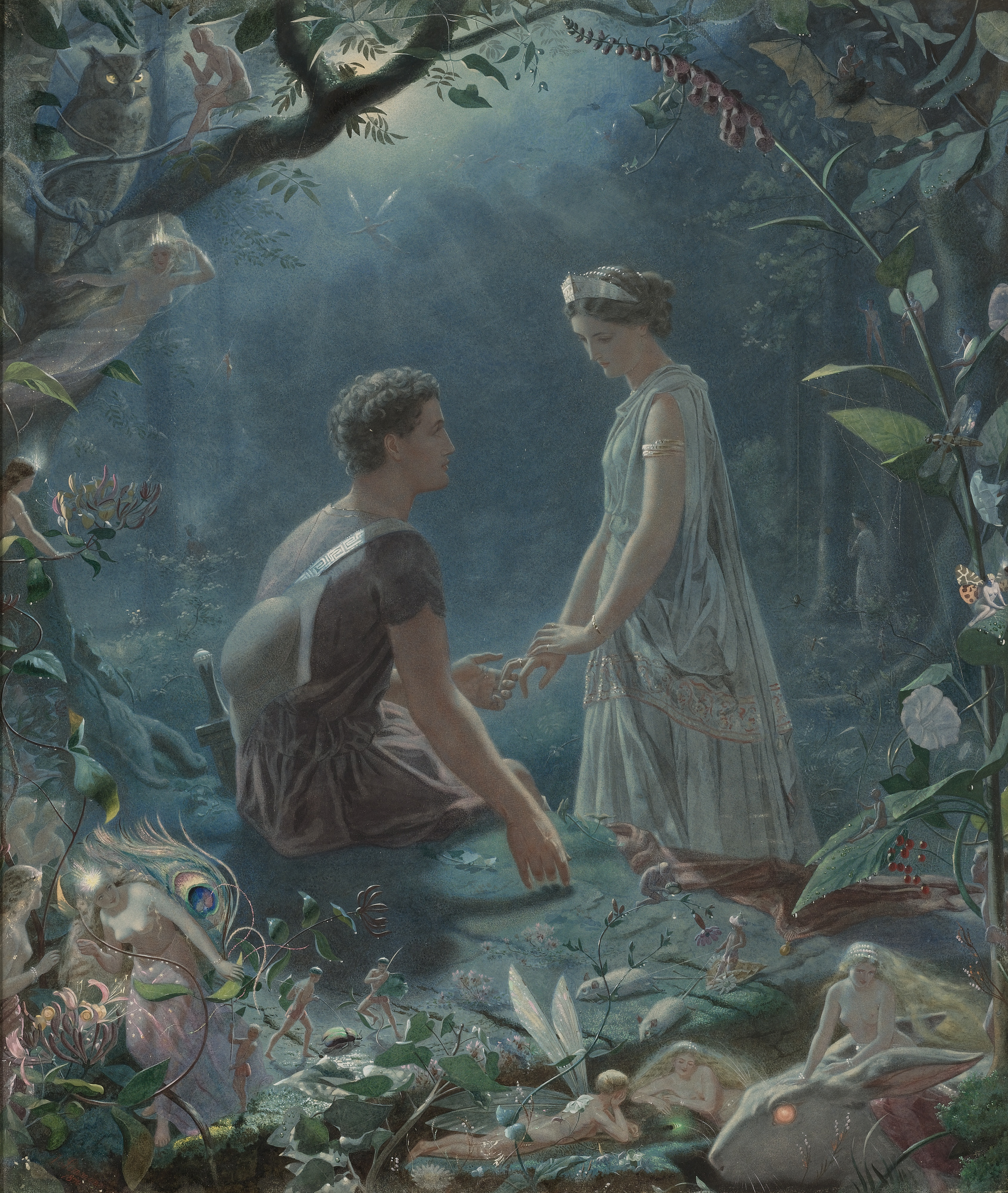
Hermia and Lysander. A Midsummer Night's Dream (1870)

Hermia and Lysander is a watercolour painting created in 1870 by the British illustrator and portrait miniature painter John Simmons. Based on a scene from Act II, scene II of William Shakespeare's comedy play A Midsummer Night's Dream, it measures 89 by 74 centimetres (35 by 29 in).

Fairy paintings were a popular genre in the later 19th century with many based on scenes from A Midsummer Night's Dream and Simmons produced several pieces in this genre. According to the art historian Christopher Wood, an expert in Victorian painting, the details included in Simmons' fairy paintings were "executed with an astonishing clarity" and gave the impression they had been painted on a glass surface. The majority of Simmons' depictions of fairies were of naked females and Wood considered them the "bunny girls of the Victorian era".

The watercolour painting, also using gouache, shows Hermia with her lover Lysander when they are lost in an enchanted wood. The couple are surrounded by a community of fairies; some are pictured in flight using their delicate wings, others are transported in chariots shackled to mice. The couple are tired and disorientated, appearing unaware of the crowds of animals and fairies around them. Lysander is seated and touching Hermia's fingers with one hand while indicating the soft forest moss with his other hand. It is the point in the tale of A Midsummer Night's Dream when he invites her to rest, saying:

One turf shall serve as pillow for us both;
One heart, one bed, two bosoms and one troth.

The painting achieved a sale price of £42,470 when auctioned in New York by Sotheby's in May 2012, a record price for work by this artist. It had previously been auctioned by Sotheby's in London on 19 June 1984 and a decade later by Sotheby's, New York, on 25 May 1994, when it was wrongly attributed to Julius Simmons.
