= 10ml Love =

2012 Indian romantic comedy film

10ml LOVE
- Release poster
- Directed by: Sharat Katariya
- Written by: Sharat Katariya
- Produced by: Sunil Joshi
- Starring: Rajat Kapoor; Tisca Chopra; Purab Kohli; Koel Purie; Tara Sharma; Neil Bhoopalam
- Cinematography: Neeraj Sahay
- Edited by: Vinod Sukumaran
- Music by: Sagar Desai
- Release date: 7 December 2012
- Running time: 90 minutes
- Country: India
- Language: Hindi

10ml Love (stylized as 10ml LOVE) is a 2012 Indian Hindi-language romantic comedy film directed by Sharat Katariya and produced by Sunil Joshi and starring Rajat Kapoor, Tisca Chopra, Purab Kohli, Koel Purie, Tara Sharma, and Neil Bhoopalam. Inspired by William Shakespeare's A Midsummer Night's Dream (whose sources include Ovid's Metamorphoses and Geoffrey Chaucer's "The Knight's Tale"), it is a contemporary story set in an Indian milieu.

== Plot ==
The film follows the relationship of three different couples whose stories intertwine. The first couple, Ghalib and Roshini, have been married for seven years. However, the wife is constantly followed by her paranoid husband who works as a herbal potion vendor. The second couple, Shweta and Peter, are in love and want to elope because Tara Sharma has a marriage arrangement. Her would-be groom, Neil, is also in a long-term, complex relationship with Minnie. On the eve of their marriage, all three couples have assembled. The insecure husband strains his relationship due to his suspicious behavior and in an attempt to fix his married life, his mother gives him a herbal potion. 'Josh-E-Jawaani.' She tells him to give a minuscule portion to his wife to make her lust for him. He tries, but is unable to do so as his wife is moving to the jungle. The other two couples are thrown into a sticky situation when the men accidentally take a sip of the potion, falling in love with the girl escaping her husband. She moves toward the jungle to save herself from both possessed men while another bride follows the group to protect her boyfriend. The next day, while the men recover from the potion, everything returns to normal.

The film has a humorous quote by a gossip-loving neighbor of Ghalib, complaining about her neglectful husband and his love for cricket: "Mujhse byah kyon kiya, Irfan Pathan ko hi ghar le aate." ("Why marry me and not just bring home Irfan Pathan?").

== Cast ==
- Rajat Kapoor as Ghalib (based on Theseus)
- Tisca Chopra as Roshini (based on Hippolyta)
- Purab Kohli as Neel (based on Demetrius)
- Koel Purie as Minnie (based on Helena)
- Tara Sharma as Shweta (based on Hermia)
- Neil Bhoopalam as Peter (based on Lysander)
- Brijendra Kala as Cook (based on Philostrate)
- Manu Rishi as Chand (based on Egeus)
- Rasika Dugal
- Anusha Bose as Sabrina
- Sarita Joshi as Ghalib's Mother

== Box office ==
10ml Love was reported a box office failure, with a gross collection estimate of 0.69 crore against a budget of 1.25 crore.

== Reception ==
The Times of India rated the movie 2.5 out of 5 stars, and commented on the witty comedy and rough sketch of love stories, while criticizing the movie for lacking depth in its story and blurry camerawork. WhileDesimartini stated, "10ml Love is a light-hearted comedy with a quirky script and hilarious dialogues. Go for it!"
