= Carly Mercedes Dyer =

English actress

- Born: 10 January 1987 (age 39); Park Royal, London, England
- Education: ArtsEd
- Years active: 2008–present

Carly Mercedes Dyer (born 10 January) is an English actress. Known for her work in musical theatre, she won a WhatsOnStage Award and received a Laurence Olivier Award nomination.

== Early life ==
Dyer was born at the Central Middlesex Hospital in North West London. She graduated from the Arts Educational School (ArtsEd) in 2008 with a Bachelor of Arts (BA) in Musical Theatre.

== Career ==
After graduating from ArtsEd, Dyer had ensemble and cover roles in High School Musical on Stage! at the Hammersmith Apollo, Hair at the English Theatre Frankfurt, Chicago at the Cambridge Theatre, Dirty Dancing at the Aldwych Theatre on the West End, Rock of Ages at the Shaftesbury and Garrick Theatres, on the UK tour Dance 'Til Dawn, and in The Lorax at the Old Vic. She returned to the Shaftesbury Theatre to play Blondie in the 2015 production of Memphis.

The next year, Dyer played Francisca in West Side Story at Salzburg Festival. She appeared in the ensemble of Dreamgirls at the Savoy Theatre. Dyer played Atropos the Fate in the 2018 London premiere of Hadestown at the National Theatre and Helene in Sweet Charity at Nottingham Playhouse alongside Rebecca Trehearn. This was followed by roles as Charlaine in Ain't Misbehavin' at the Mercury Theatre, Colchester and Southwark Playhouse and as Henri in The View UpStairs at Soho Theatre. In late 2019, Dyer returned to West Side Story, this time starring as Anita at the Curve Theatre in Leicester.

Dyer was set to portray Jane Seymour in the 2020 tour of Six, but was unable to in light of the COVID-19 pandemic. She was subsequently cast as Erma in Anything Goes at the Barbican Centre in 2021 as well as the 2022 tour of the production. For her performance, Dyer won a WhatsOnStage Award and was nominated for the Laurence Olivier Award for Best Actress in a Supporting Role in a Musical. Also in 2021, she returned to the Curve to play Cassie Ferguson in A Chorus Line in 2021. She would later reprise her role as Cassie in the 2024 West End production of A Chorus Line. She also appeared in the 2022 Gypsy concert at the Alexandra Palace Theatre.

In 2023, Dyer starred as Lynette Fromme in Assassins at Chichester Festival Theatre and Faye Treadwell in the UK and Ireland tour of The Drifters Girl. She featured in the 2024 concert of Dirty Rotten Scoundrels. In 2025, Dyer has a role in The Frogs at Southwark Playhouse with Kevin McHale.

== Personal life ==
In summer 2022, Dyer was diagnosed with uterine fibroids. She subsequently underwent a myomectomy.

== Stage ==
Year	Title	Role	Notes
2008	High School Musical	Ensemble, cover Taylor McKessie / Martha Cox	Hammersmith Apollo
2008	Hair	Ensemble / cover Jeanie	English Theatre Frankfurt
2009–2010	Chicago	Ensemble	Cambridge Theatre
2010–2011	Dirty Dancing	Featured Singer / Ensemble	Aldwych Theatre, London
2011	Rock of Ages	Waitress #1 / Dance Captain	Shaftesbury Theatre / Garrick Theatre, London
2014	Dance 'Til Dawn	Ensemble	UK Tour
2015	Memphis	Blondie	Shaftesbury Theatre, London
2015	The Lorax	Ensemble	Old Vic, London
2016	West Side Story	Francisca	Salzburg Festival
2016–2017	Dreamgirls	Ensemble / 1st cover Lorelle / Michelle	Savoy Theatre, London
2018	Sweet Charity	Helene	Nottingham Playhouse
2018	Hadestown	Fate (Atropos)	National Theatre, London
2019	Ain't Misbehavin'	Charlaine	Mercury Theatre, Colchester / Southwark Playhouse
2019	The View UpStairs	Henri	Soho Theatre, London
2019–2020	West Side Story	Anita	Curve Theatre, Leicester
2021, 2022	Anything Goes	Erma	Barbican Centre, London / UK Tour
2021, 2024	A Chorus Line	Cassie Ferguson	Curve Theatre, Leicester
2022	Gypsy	June	Alexandra Palace Theatre, London
2023	Assassins	Lynette "Squeaky" Fromme	Chichester Festival Theatre
2023–2024	The Drifters Girl	Faye Treadwell	UK and Ireland tour
2024	Dirty Rotten Scoundrels	Christine Colgate	Concert
2025	The Frogs		
2025-2026	Singin' in the Rain	Kathy Selden	Royal Exchange Theatre, Manchester
2026	High Society	Liz	Barbican Theatre, London

== Awards and nominations ==
Year	Award	Category	Work	Result	Ref.
2022	WhatsOnStage Awards	Best Supporting Actress in a Musical	Anything Goes	Won	
2022	Laurence Olivier Awards	Best Actress in a Supporting Role in a Musical	Anything Goes	Nominated	
