= Matt Henry =

Matt(hew) Henry may refer to:

- Matthew Henry (1662–1714), English commentator on the Bible and Presbyterian minister
- Matt Henry (cricketer) (born 1991), New Zealand international cricketer
- Matt Henry (singer), British singer and actor
