= Illustrator =

Artist enhancing writing with images

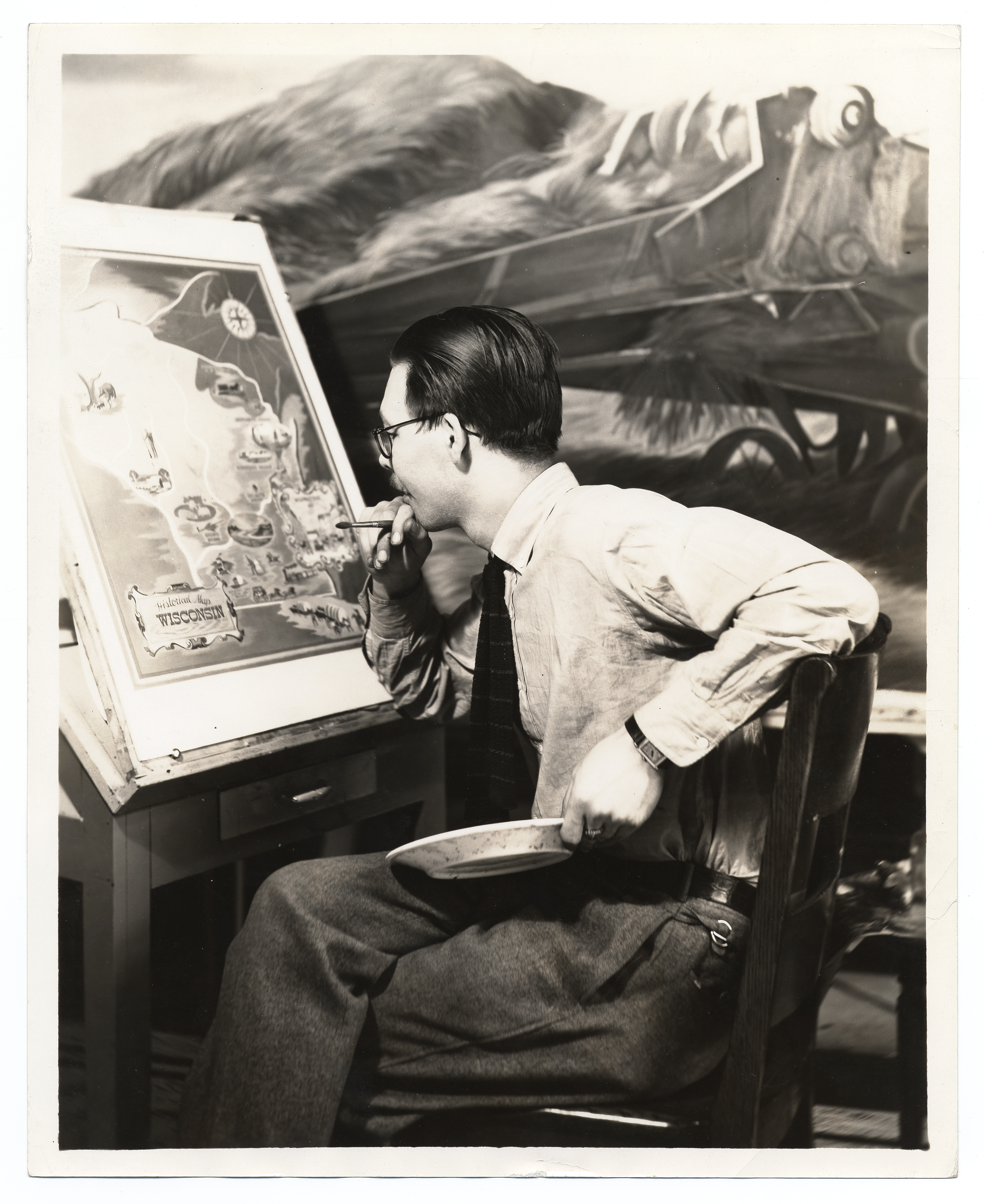
An Illustrator named Richard H. Jansen

An illustrator is an artist who specializes in enhancing, clarifying, and decorating writing and other media providing a visual representation that corresponds to the content of the associated text or idea. Illustration may be intended to clarify complicated concepts or objects that are difficult to describe textually, or may operate independently to communicate visually.

Illustration is the art of making images that work with something and add to it without needing direct attention and without distracting from what they illustrate. The other thing is the focus of the attention, and the illustration's role is to add personality and character without competing with that other thing.

Illustrations have been used in advertisements, architectural rendering, greeting cards, posters, books, graphic novels, children's literature. storyboards, business, technical communications, magazines, shirts, video games, tutorials, and newspapers. A cartoon illustration can add humour to certain stories or essays.

== Techniques ==
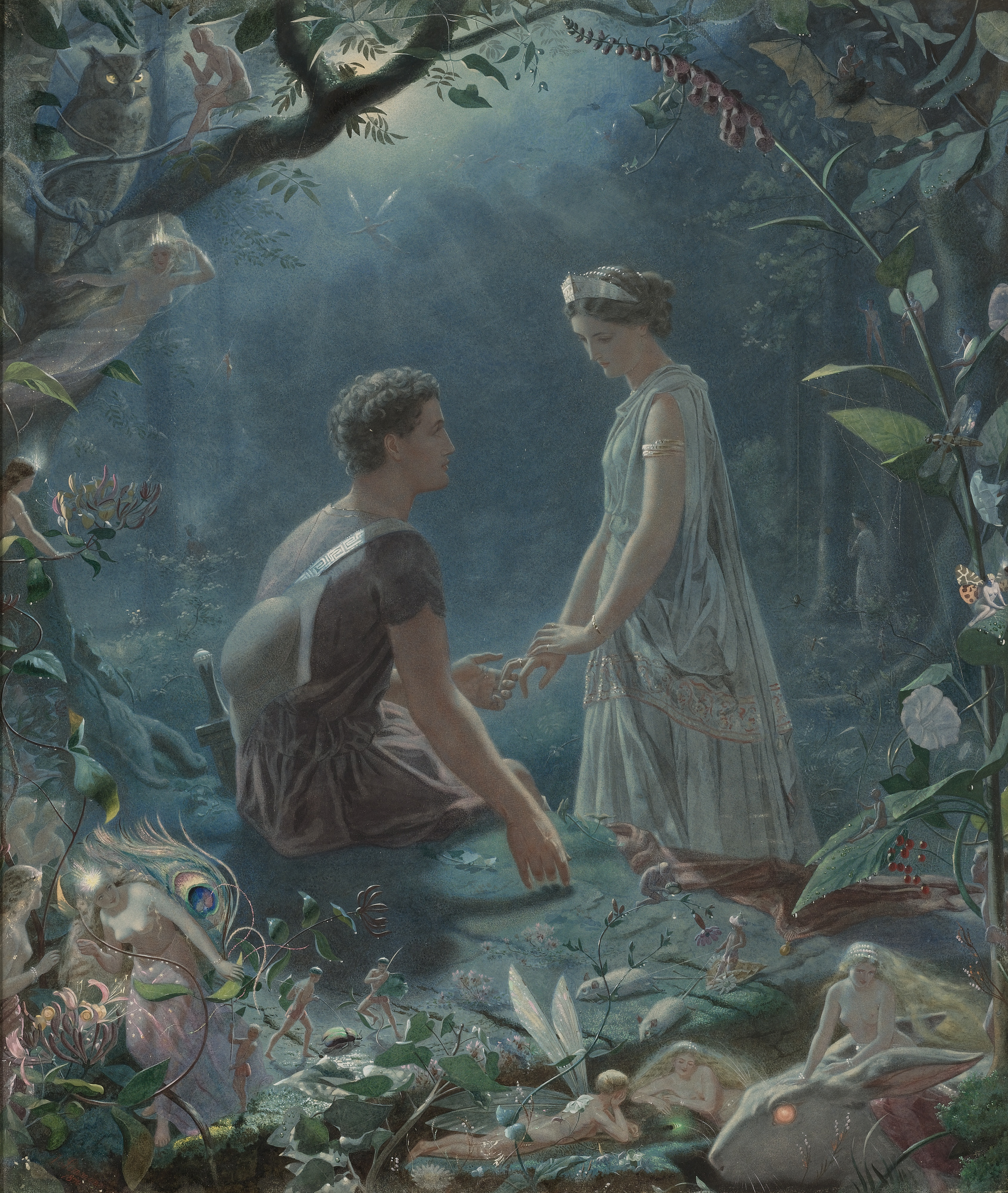
A watercolor, by John Simmons, depicting Hermia and Lysander, from A Midsummer Night's Dream (1870)

Some traditional illustration techniques include watercolor, pen and ink, airbrush art, oil painting, pastels, wood engraving, and linoleum cuts.

Many universities and art schools offer specific courses in illustration. Many professional illustrators attended an art school or college of some sort and were trained in different painting and drawing techniques. Many illustrators are freelanceand commissioned by publishers (of newspapers, books, or magazines) or advertising agencies. Most scientific illustrations and technical illustrations are also known as information graphics. Among the information graphics, specialists are medical illustrators who illustrate human anatomy, often requiring many years of artistic and medical training.

A particularly popular medium with some illustrators of the 1940s and 1950s was casein, as was egg tempera. The immediacy and durability of these media suited illustration's demands well. The artwork in both types of paint withstood the rigors of travel to clients and printers without damage.

The introduction of computer illustration added a new medium of art for illustrators. Computer illustration, or digital illustration, is the use of digital tools to produce images under the direct manipulation of the artist, usually through a pointing device, such as a tablet or a mouse. Many cartoonists and illustrators create digital illustrations using computers, graphics tablets, and scanners. Software such as Adobe Illustrator, Adobe Photoshop, GIMP, Corel Painter, and Affinity Designer are now widely used by professionals.

== See also ==
- Airbrush artist
- Archaeological illustration
- Architectural illustrator
- Cartoonist
- Fashion illustration
- Graphic designer
- Marker rendering
- Painters
- Pictorial maps
- Storyboard artist
- Stuttgart Database of Scientific Illustrators
- Visualizer
