= The Drifters Girl =

2021 jukebox musical

- Music: Various
- Lyrics: Various
- Book: Ed Curtis; Tina Treadwell (idea)
- Basis: Story and music of The Drifters
- Premiere: 9 October 2021: Theatre Royal, Newcastle
- Productions: 2021 Newcastle-upon-Tyne; 2021 West End

The Drifters Girl is a jukebox musical with a book by Ed Curtis based on an idea by Tina Treadwell. It is based on the story of the American vocal group The Drifters and their manager from 1967 until 2001, Faye Treadwell. The musical features The Drifters' music.

== Production history ==
=== World premiere: Newcastle tryout & West End (2021-22) ===
The musical made its world premiere at the Theatre Royal, Newcastle on 9 October, running until 23 October 2021 prior to a run in London's West End at the Garrick Theatre from 4 November 2021 until 26 March 2022. The production is directed by Jonathan Church with a set designed by Anthony Ward, costumes by Faye Fullerton, choreographed by Karen Bruce, lighting design by Ben Cracknell, sound design by Tom Marshall, and music direction by Chris Egan. The show is produced by Michael Harrison and David Ian. Beverley Knight stars as Faye Treadwell with Adam J. Bernard, Tarinn Callender, Matt Henry and Tosh Wanogho-Maud as The Drifters who also co-created the musical. The musical was originally announced in November 2019 to open in September 2020, however was postponed due to the COVID-19 pandemic.

The production received two Laurence Olivier Award nominations in 2022, for Best New Musical and Best Actress in a Musical. Knight also received a WhatsOnStage Award nomination for her performance.

The World Premiere Cast Recording for the musical was recorded by Knight, Bernard, Callender, Henry and Wanogho-Maud at Abbey Road Studios and was released on 6 May 2022.

Knight played her final two shows as Faye Treadwell on 2 July 2022 and was succeeded by Broadway actress Felicia Boswell in her West End debut.

=== UK and Ireland tour (2023-24) ===
A UK and Ireland tour was announced to begin at the Mayflower Theatre, Southampton in September 2023, with dates until May 2024.

== Musical numbers ==
The musical features songs made famous by The Drifters including;

1. "Hello Happiness"/"Kissin’ In The Back Row Of The Movies"/"There Goes My First Love" – The Drifters
2. "Money Money" – Clyde
3. "Follow Me" – Faye
4. "Whatcha Gonna Do" – Clyde, Johnny and Ben
5. "Fools Fall in Love" – Clyde
6. "Nobody But Me" – Faye
7. "Save The Last Dance For Me" – Ben
8. "This Magic Moment" – Ben
9. "Stand By Me" – Ben
10. "Sweets for My Sweet" – Ben
11. "I Don't Wanna Go On Without You"/"Stand By Me" – Faye
12. "Saturday Night At The Movies" – Johnny
13. "There Goes My Baby" – George
14. "When My Little Girl Is Smiling" – Clyde
15. "Under The Boardwalk" – Ben
16. "In the Land of Make Believe" – Clyde and Ben
17. "Harlem Child" – Faye
18. "Kissin’ In The Back Row Of The Movies" – Johnny
19. "There Goes My First Love" – Johnny
20. "Come On Over To My Place" – Johnny
21. "There Goes My Baby" (reprise) – Faye and George
22. "You're More Than a Number in My Little Red Book" – Faye and The Drifters

== Cast and characters ==
Character	Newcastle & West End	UK and Ireland tour
Character	2021	2023
Faye Treadwell	Beverley Knight	Carly Mercedes Dyer
George Treadwell & others	Adam J. Bernard	Miles Anthony Daley
Johnny Moore, Gerhart Thrasher & others	Tarinn Callender	Daniel Haswell
Clyde McPhatter, Lover Patterson & others	Matt Henry	Tarik Frimpong
Ben E. King, Rudy Lewis & others	Tosh Wanogho-Maud	Ashford Campbell

== Awards and nominations ==
Year	Award	Category	Nominee	Result
2022	Laurence Olivier Award	Best New Musical		Nominated
2022	Laurence Olivier Award	Best Actress in a Musical	Beverley Knight	Nominated
2022	WhatsOnStage Award	Best Performer in a Female Identifying Role in a Musical	Beverley Knight	Nominated
