= 2022 Laurence Olivier Awards =

Award ceremony

- Date: 10 April 2022
- Location: Royal Albert Hall
- Hosted by: Jason Manford
- Most wins: Cabaret (7)
- Most nominations: Cabaret (11)

Television/radio coverage
- Network: ITV (television); Magic (radio)

The 2022 Laurence Olivier Awards were held on 10 April 2022 at the Royal Albert Hall and hosted by Jason Manford. They were the first Oliviers to be held since 2020 due to the complete shutdown of UK theatres in 2020/2021 as a result of lockdowns caused by the COVID-19 pandemic. Due to this, the eligibility period was expanded from 19 February 2020 to 22 February 2022. The green carpet, hosted by Emma B, Angellica Bell, Frank DiLella and Anita Rani, was livestreamed on YouTube and the Olivier ceremony itself was broadcast in full on Magic with hosts Alice Arnold and Ruthie Henshall. Highlights from the show were broadcast on ITV.

== Event calendar ==
- 2 February: In-person event hosted by Jason Manford and venue confirmed at the Royal Albert Hall announcement
- 8 March: Nominations announcement by Miriam-Teak Lee and Sam Tutty
- 24 March: Special Recognition Award recipients announced
- 10 April: Award ceremony held

== Presenters ==
- Jade Anouka
- Floella Benjamin
- Don Black
- Anne-Marie Duff
- Noma Dumezweni
- Tom Felton
- Kit Harington
- Max Harwood
- Ruthie Henshall
- Cassidy Janson
- Beverley Knight
- Bonnie Langford
- Miriam-Teak Lee
- Oti Mabuse
- Arlene Phillips
- Jonathan Pryce
- Keala Settle
- Ranj Singh
- Giles Terera
- Sam Tutty
- Eric Underwood
- Layton Williams

== Performances ==
- Samantha Barks, Stephanie McKeon and the cast of Frozen – "For the First Time in Forever/Let It Go"
- Beverley Knight and the cast of The Drifters Girl – "Kissin' in the Back Row of the Movies/Harlem Child/You're More than a Number in my Little Red Book"
- Hiran Abeysekera and the cast of Life of Pi
- Kerry Ellis and the cast of Anything Goes – "Anything Goes"
- Olly Dobson, Cedric Neal and the cast of Back to the Future
- Arinzé Kene and the cast of Get Up, Stand Up – "Get Up, Stand Up"
- "State Anthem of Ukraine"
- Amy Lennox from Cabaret – "Cabaret"
- The cast of Dear Evan Hansen – "For Forever/You Will Be Found" (in memoriam)
- Clive Carter and the cast of Moulin Rouge – "Welcome to the Moulin Rouge"
- The cast of Spring Awakening – "The Song of Purple Summer"
- Tanisha Spring, Jon Tsouras and the covers & swings of the West End "Our Time"

== Winners and nominees ==
The nominations were announced on 8 March 2022 in 26 categories.

Best New Play	Best New Musical
Life of Pi by Lolita Chakrabarti (based on original text by Yann Martel) – Wyndham's Theatre; 2:22 A Ghost Story by Danny Robins – Noël Coward Theatre; Best of Enemies by James Graham – Young Vic; Cruise by Jack Holden – Duchess Theatre	Back to the Future – Adelphi Theatre; Frozen – Theatre Royal, Drury Lane; Get Up, Stand Up – Lyric Theatre; Moulin Rouge – Piccadilly Theatre; The Drifters Girl – Garrick Theatre
Best Revival	Best Musical Revival
Constellations – Donmar Warehouse at Vaudeville Theatre; A Number – Old Vic; The Normal Heart – National Theatre Olivier; The Tragedy of Macbeth – Almeida Theatre	Cabaret – Playhouse Theatre; Anything Goes – Barbican Theatre; Spring Awakening – Almeida Theatre
Best Entertainment or Comedy Play	Best Family Show
Pride and Prejudice* (*sort of) by Isobel McArthur – Criterion Theatre*; Pantoland at the Palladium by Michael Harrison – London Palladium; The Choir of Man by Nic Doodson and Andrew Kay – Arts Theatre; The Shark Is Broken by Joseph Nixon and Ian Shaw – Ambassadors Theatre	Wolf Witch Giant Fairy – Royal Opera House, Linbury Theatre; Billionaire Boy – Garrick Theatre; Dragons and Mythical Beasts – Regent's Park Open Air Theatre; What the Ladybird Heard – Palace Theatre
Best Actor	Best Actress
Hiran Abeysekera as Pi Patel in Life of Pi – Wyndham's Theatre; Ben Daniels as Ned Weeks in The Normal Heart – National Theatre Olivier; Omari Douglas as Manuel in Constellations – Donmar Warehouse at Vaudeville Theatre; Charles Edwards as Gore Vidal in Best of Enemies – Young Vic	Sheila Atim as Marianne in Constellations – Donmar Warehouse at Vaudeville Theatre; Lily Allen as Jenny in 2:22 A Ghost Story – Noël Coward Theatre; Emma Corrin as Anna in Anna X – Harold Pinter Theatre; Cush Jumbo as Hamlet in Hamlet – Young Vic
Best Actor in a Musical	Best Actress in a Musical
Eddie Redmayne as Emcee in Cabaret – Playhouse Theatre; Olly Dobson as Marty McFly in Back to the Future – Adelphi Theatre; Arinzé Kene as Bob Marley in Get Up, Stand Up – Lyric Theatre; Robert Lindsay as Moonface Martin in Anything Goes – Barbican Theatre	Jessie Buckley as Sally Bowles in Cabaret – Playhouse Theatre; Sutton Foster as Reno Sweeney in Anything Goes – Barbican Theatre; Beverley Knight as Faye Treadwell in The Drifters Girl – Garrick Theatre; Stephanie McKeon as Anna in Frozen – Theatre Royal, Drury Lane
Best Actor in a Supporting Role	Best Actress in a Supporting Role
Fred Davis, Daisy Franks, Romina Hytten, Tom Larkin, Habib Nasib Nader, Tom Stacy and Scarlet Wilderink as the Tiger in Life of Pi – Wyndham's Theatre; Dino Fetscher as Felix Turner in The Normal Heart – National Theatre Olivier; Nathaniel Parker as Henry VIII in The Mirror and the Light – Gielgud Theatre; Danny Lee Wynter as Tommy Boatwright in The Normal Heart – National Theatre Olivier	Liz Carr as Dr. Emma Brookner in The Normal Heart – National Theatre Olivier; Tori Burgess as Lydia Bennet in Pride and Prejudice* (*sort of) – Criterion Theatre; Christina Gordon as Jane Bennet in Pride and Prejudice* (*sort of) – Criterion Theatre; Akiya Henry as Lady Macduff in The Tragedy of Macbeth – Almeida Theatre
Best Actor in a Supporting Role in a Musical	Best Actress in a Supporting Role in a Musical
Elliot Levey as Herr Schultz in Cabaret – Playhouse Theatre; Clive Carter as Harold Zidler in Moulin Rouge – Piccadilly Theatre; Hugh Coles as George McFly in Back to the Future – Adelphi Theatre; Gary Wilmot as Elisha J. Whitney in Anything Goes – Barbican Theatre	Liza Sadovy as Fraulein Schneider in Cabaret – Playhouse Theatre; Gabrielle Brooks as Rita Marley in Get Up, Stand Up – Lyric Theatre; Victoria Hamilton-Barritt as Stepmother in Cinderella – Gillian Lynne Theatre; Carly Mercedes Dyer as Irma in Anything Goes – Barbican Theatre
Best Director	Best Theatre Choreographer
Rebecca Frecknall for Cabaret – Playhouse Theatre; Michael Longhurst for Constellations – Donmar Warehouse at Vaudeville Theatre; Kathleen Marshall for Anything Goes – Barbican Theatre; Max Webster for Life of Pi – Wyndham's Theatre	Kathleen Marshall for Anything Goes – Barbican Theatre; Finn Caldwell for Life of Pi – Wyndham's Theatre; Julia Cheng for Cabaret – Playhouse Theatre; Sonya Tayeh for Moulin Rouge – Piccadilly Theatre
Best Set Design	Best Costume Design
Tim Hatley for scenic designing and Nick Barnes and Finn Caldwell for puppetry designing Life of Pi – Wyndham's Theatre; Tim Hatley for scenic designing and Finn Ross for video designing Back to the Future – Adelphi Theatre; Derek McLane for Moulin Rouge – Piccadilly Theatre; Tom Scutt for Cabaret – Playhouse Theatre	Catherine Zuber for Moulin Rouge – Piccadilly Theatre; Jon Morrell for Anything Goes – Barbican Theatre; Christopher Oram for Frozen – Theatre Royal, Drury Lane; Tom Scutt for Cabaret – Playhouse Theatre
Best Lighting Design	Best Sound Design
Andrzej Goulding and Tim Lutkin for Life of Pi – Wyndham's Theatre; Neil Austin for Frozen – Theatre Royal, Drury Lane; Isabella Byrd for Cabaret – Playhouse Theatre; Tim Lutkin for Back to the Future – Adelphi Theatre	Nick Lidster for Cabaret – Playhouse Theatre; Ian Dickinson for 2:22 A Ghost Story – Noël Coward Theatre; Carolyn Downing for Life of Pi – Wyndham's Theatre; Gareth Owen for Back to the Future – Adelphi Theatre
Best Original Score or New Orchestrations
Simon Hale for orchestrating Get Up, Stand Up – Lyric Theatre; Glen Ballard and Alan Silvestri for scoring and lyricising and Bryan Crook and Ethan Popp for orchestrating Back to the Future – Adelphi Theatre; David Chase, Bill Elliott and Rob Fisher for orchestrating Anything Goes – Barbican Theatre; Andrew T. Mackay for composing Life of Pi – Wyndham's Theatre
Best New Dance Production	Outstanding Achievement in Dance
Revisor by Crystal Pite and Jonathon Young, Kidd Pivot – Sadler's Wells; Draw from Within by Wim Vandekeybus, Rambert Dance Company – Sadler's Wells; Transverse Orientation by Dimitris Papaioannou – Dance Umbrella and Sadler's Wells	Arielle Smith for choreographing Jolly Folly in Reunion, English National Ballet – Sadler's Wells; Acosta Danza for De Punta a Cabo in 100% Cuban – Sadler's Wells; Dancers for performing in NDT2 Tour – Sadler's Wells; Edward Watson for performing in The Dante Project by Wayne McGregor – Royal Ballet at Royal Opera House
Best New Opera Production	Outstanding Achievement in Opera
Jenůfa, Royal Opera – Royal Opera House; Bajazet, Irish National Opera and Royal Opera – Linbury Theatre, Royal Opera House; The Cunning Little Vixen, English National Opera – London Coliseum; Theodora, Royal Opera – Royal Opera House	Peter Whelan and the Irish Baroque Orchestra for Bajazet, Irish National Opera and Royal Opera – Linbury Theatre, Royal Opera House; Christine Rice for performing in 4/4 – Royal Opera House; takis for scenic and costume designing HMS Pinafore, English National Opera – London Coliseum
Outstanding Achievement in an Affiliate Theatre
Old Bridge – Bush Theatre; 10 Nights – Bush Theatre; A Place for We – Park Theatre; Folk – Hampstead Theatre Downstairs; The Invisible Hand – Kiln Theatre
Special Recognition Award
Lisa Burger; Bob King; Gloria Louis; Susie Sainsbury; Sylvia Young

== Productions with multiple wins and nominations ==
=== Multiple wins ===
The following 3 productions received multiple awards:

- 7: Cabaret
- 5: Life of Pi
- 2: Constellations

=== Multiple nominations ===
The following 14 productions and 1 opera received multiple nominations:

- 11: Cabaret
- 9: Anything Goes, Life of Pi
- 7: Back to the Future
- 5: Moulin Rouge, The Normal Heart
- 4: Constellations, Frozen, Get Up, Stand Up
- 3: 2:22 A Ghost Story, Pride and Prejudice* (*sort of)
- 2: Bajazet, Best of Enemies, The Drifters Girl, The Tragedy of Macbeth

== See also ==
- 75th Tony Awards
