= Puck (A Midsummer Night's Dream) =

Character in A Midsummer Night's Dream

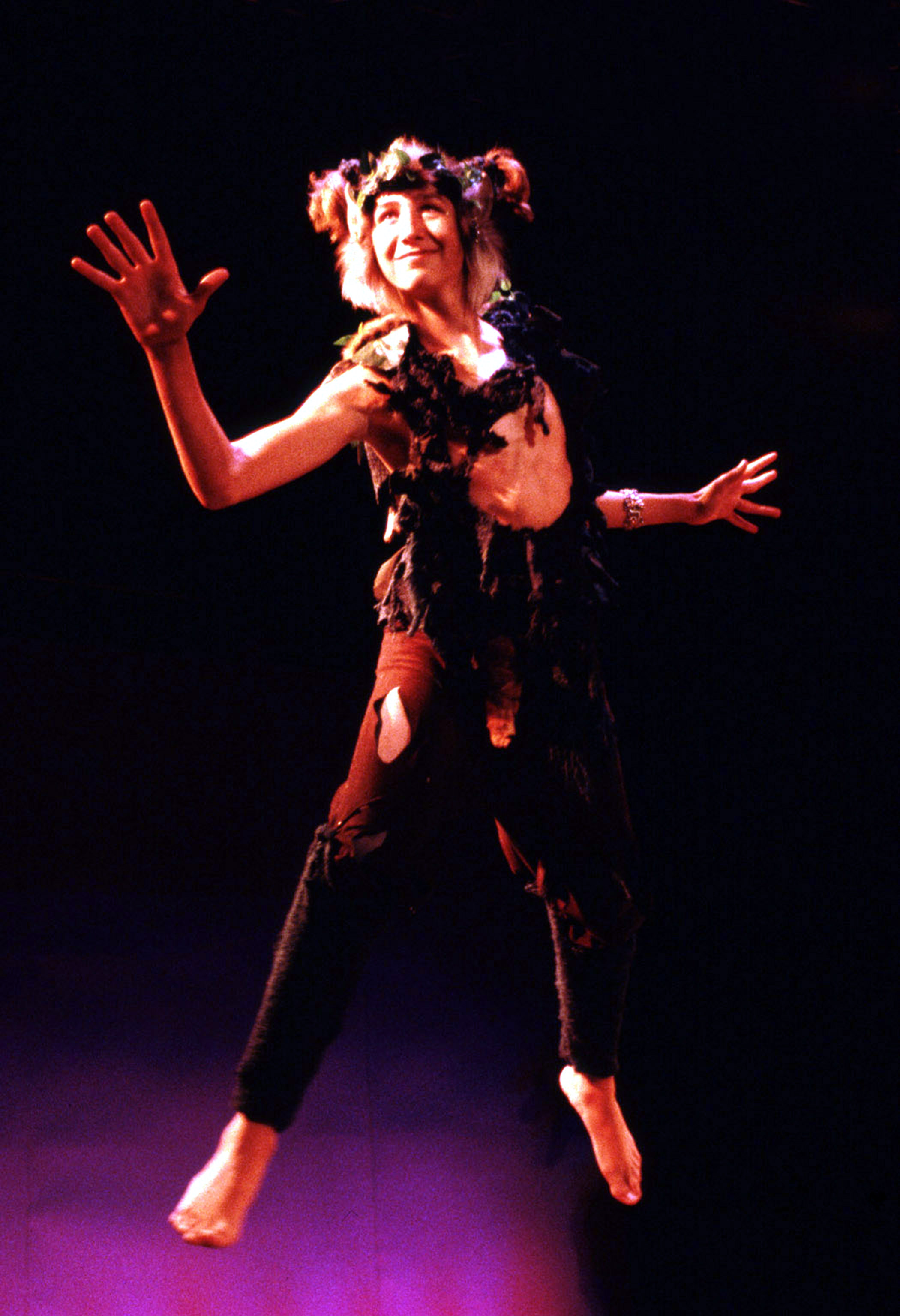
Vince Cardinale as Puck from the Carmel Shakespeare Festival production of A Midsummer Night's Dream, September 2000

Puck, or Robin Goodfellow, is a character in William Shakespeare's play A Midsummer Night's Dream.

Based on the Puck of English mythology and the púca of Celtic mythology, Puck is a mischievous fairy, sprite, or jester. He is the first of the main fairy characters to appear in the play, during which he significantly influences events. He delights in such pranks as replacing Nick Bottom's head with that of an ass; hiding in a bowl of ale as a roasted crab apple, then spilling the ale on drinkers; and disguising himself as a three-legged stool to trick an old woman into sitting down before he slips away and lets her fall.

== Appearances in the play ==
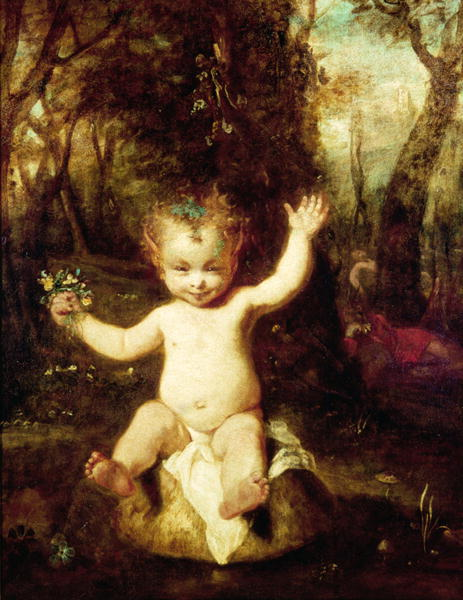
Puck (1789) by Joshua Reynolds

The audience is introduced to Puck in 2.1:

FAIRY:
Either I mistake your shape and making quite,
Or else you are that shrewd and knavish sprite
Call'd Robin Goodfellow: are you not he
That frights the maidens of the villagery;
Skim milk, and sometimes labour in the quern,
And bootless make the breathless housewife churn;
And sometime make the drink to bear no barm;
Mislead night wanderers, laughing at their harm?
Those that Hobgoblin call you and sweet Puck,
You do their work, and they shall have good luck:
Are you not he?

PUCK:
Fairy, thou speak'st aright;
I am that merry wanderer of the night.
I jest to Oberon, and make him smile
When I a fat and bean-fed horse beguile
Neighing in likeness of a filly foal;
And sometime lurk I in a gossip's bowl,
In very likeness of a roasted crab;
And, when she drinks, against her lips I bob
And on her wither'd dewlap pour the ale.
The wisest aunt, telling the saddest tale,
Sometime for three-foot stool mistaketh me;
Then slip I from her bum, down topples she,
And 'tailor' cries, and falls into a cough;
And then the whole quire hold their hips and laugh;
And waxen in their mirth, and neeze, and swear
A merrier hour was never wasted there.

— Act 2, scene 1, lines 32–57

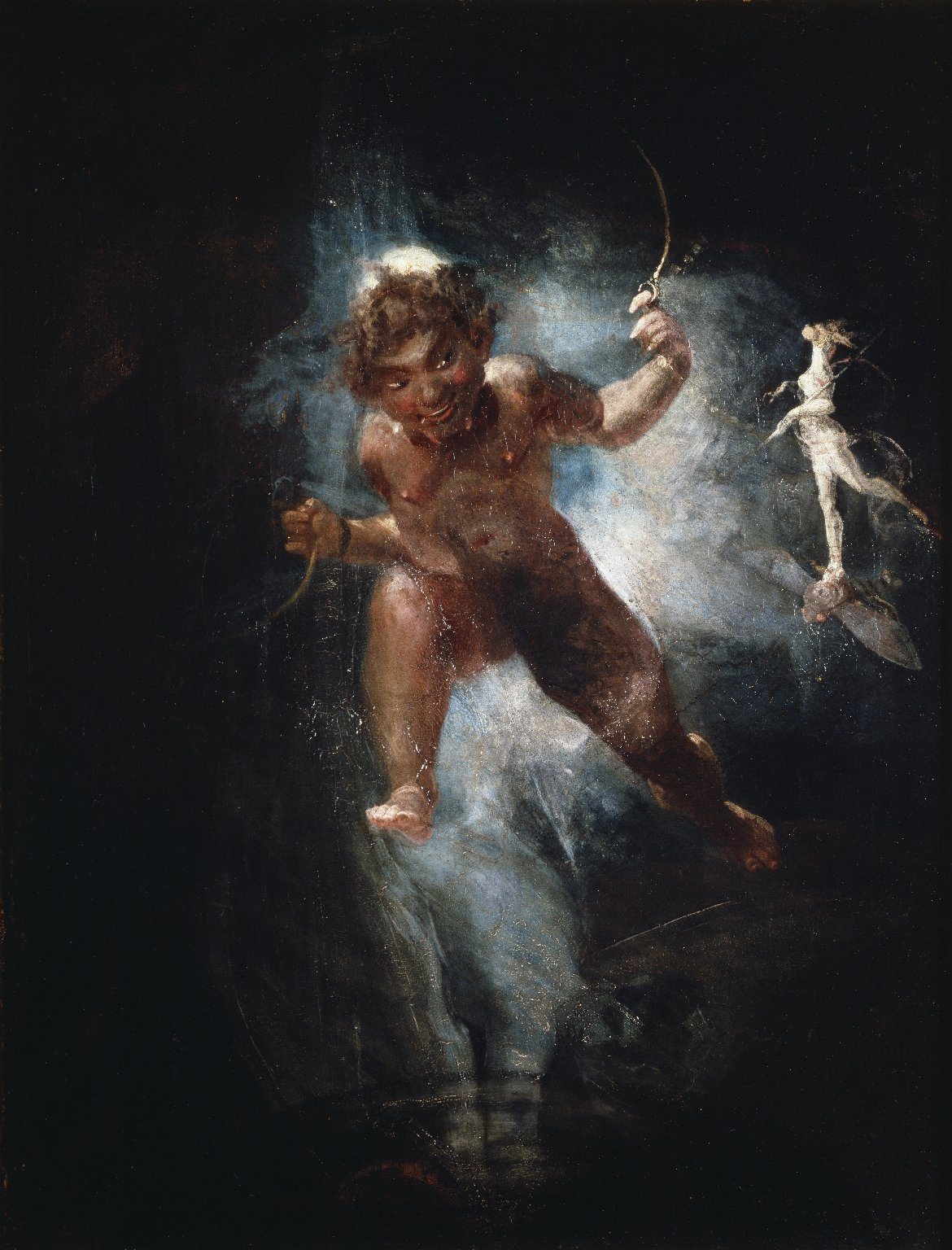
Puck (c. 1810–1820), Henry Fuseli's depiction of the character

Puck serves the fairy king Oberon. Oberon is angry with Titania, the fairy queen, because she will not let him have a particular "little changeling boy" (2.1.120). Oberon sends Puck to fetch a particular flower, whereof the juice "on sleeping eyelids laid / Will make or man or woman madly dote / Upon the next live creature that it sees" (2.1.170–72). Puck is told to apply some of it to the "disdainful youth" (2.1.261) in "Athenian garments" (2.1.264), but Puck mistakes Lysander for Demetrius and applies it to Lysander. Oberon applies some of the juice to Titania, and Titania is waked by a singing Nick Bottom, whose head Puck has changed to that of an ass. Later, Puck is ordered to rectify his mistake with Lysander and Demetrius, and he creates a black fog through which he separates the "testy rivals" (3.2.358), imitating their voices until they are asleep. Puck has the final lines of the play:

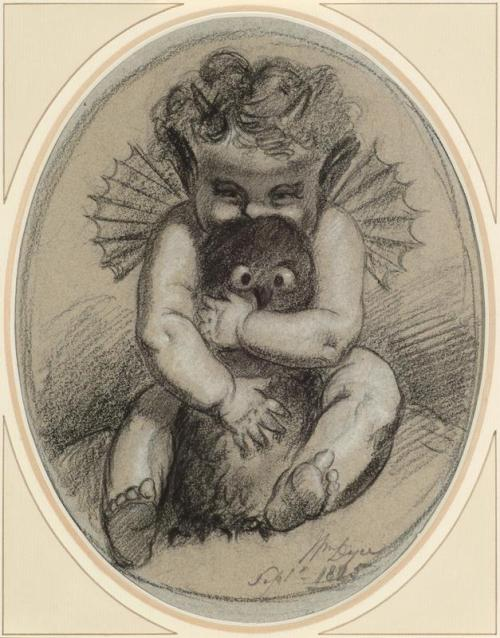
Puck by William Dyce, (1825) Aberdeen Archives, Gallery and Museums

If we shadows have offended,
Think but this, and all is mended.
That you have but slumber'd here
While these visions did appear.
And this weak and idle theme,
No more yielding but a dream,
Gentles, do not reprehend:
If you pardon, we will mend.
And, as I'm an honest Puck,
If we have unearned luck
Now to 'scape the serpent's tongue,
We will make amends ere long;
Else the Puck a liar call:
So, good night unto you all.
Give me your hands, if we be friends,
And Robin shall restore amends.

— Act 5, scene 1, lines 433–448

== Character name ==
The original texts of Shakespeare's plays do not have cast-lists, and are not always consistent with characters' names. Puck's case is particularly awkward. Both the Quarto and the First Folio call the character "Robin Goodfellow" on first entrance, but "Puck" later in the same scene, and they remain inconsistent. The Arden Shakespeare calls the character "Puck", and emends all stage directions (but not dialogue) that refer to the character as "Robin" or "Robin Goodfellow".

== Portrayals and notable cultural references ==
This list excludes non-Shakespearean references. They may be found at Puck (folklore).

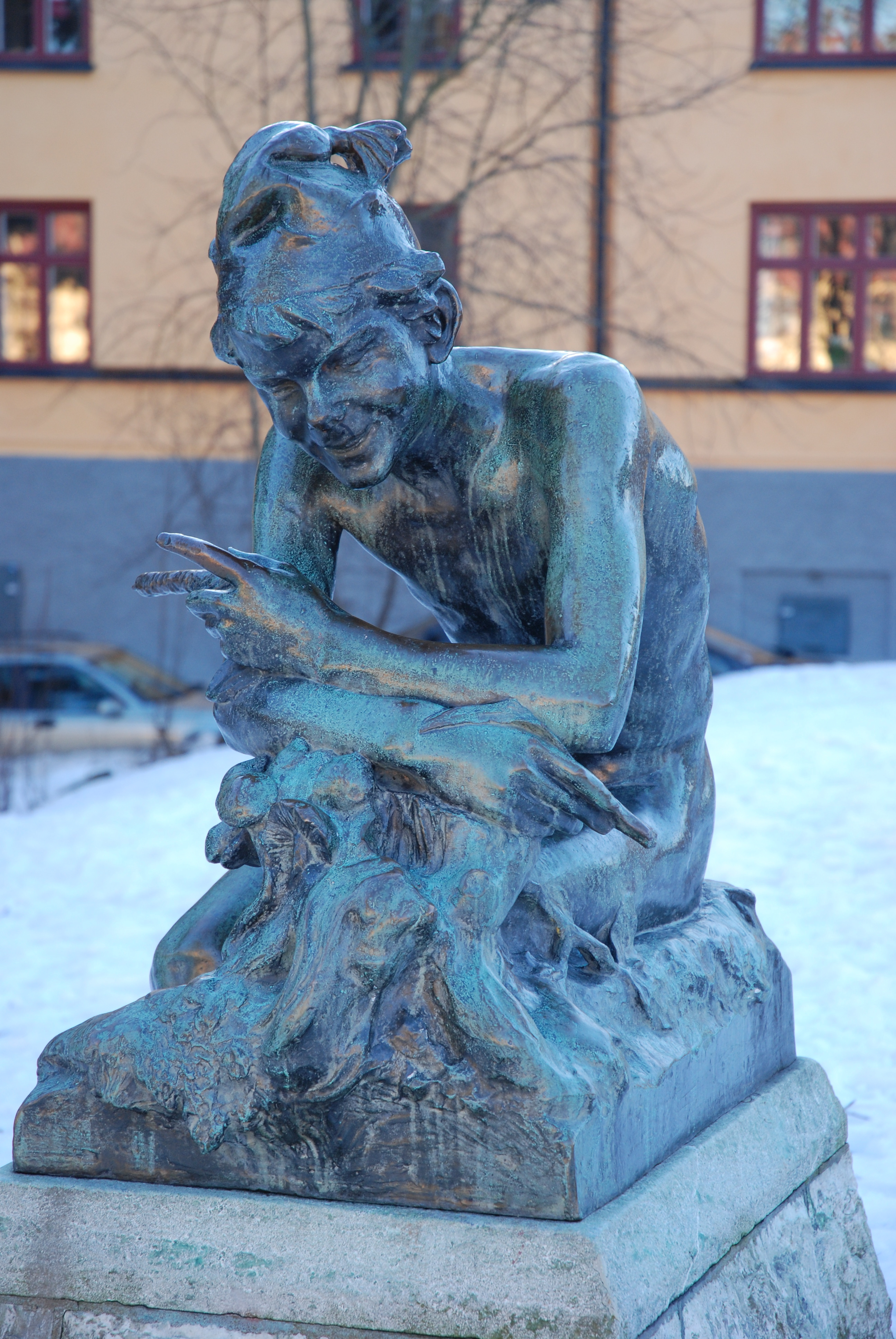
Puck by Carl Andersson (sculptor), Midsommarkransen, Stockholm, Sweden

=== Film and TV ===
- Mickey Rooney, in the Oscar-winning 1935 film.
- Ian Holm, in the 1968 film.
- Phil Daniels, in the 1981 BBC Shakespeare television production.
- Razzak Khan, in the 1988 West End production.
- Robert Sean Leonard plays Puck in a high-school production in the 1989 film Dead Poets Society.
- Stanley Tucci, in the 1999 film.
- Tanner Cohen, in a high-school production depicted in the 2008 film Were the World Mine.
- Hiran Abeysekera in the 2016 film.
- Avan Jogia, in the 2017 film.
- Ken Nwosu, in Upstart Crow in 2018.
- Jonathan Whitesell plays a version of Robin Goodfellow in The Chilling Adventures of Sabrina in 2020.
- Jack Gleeson played Puck in season 2 (2025) of The Sandman on Netflix,

=== Theatre ===
- Gertrud Eysoldt, first on 10 April, 1893 at the Riga City Theater, and later in Max Reinhardt's 1905 production in Berlin.
- Frederick Peisley in Donald Wolfit's production in 1947.
- Adam Darius, with the Stora Teatern in Göteborg, Sweden in 1961.
- John Kane, with The Royal Shakespeare Company in 1970.
- Puck is renamed "Dr. Wheelgood" in Diane Paulus's production The Donkey Show in 1999.
- Karenssa LeGear in Schoenberg Hall's 2007 production.
- Matthew Tennyson, with Shakespeare's Globe Theatre in 2013.
- Kathryn Hunter in Julie Taymor's 2013 production for the Theatre for a New Audience.
- David Moorst in National Theatre Live's production at Bridge Theatre in 2019. He reprised the role in 2025.
- Michael Grady-Hall in the 2026 Shakespeare's Globe Theatre production.

=== Painting and sculpture ===
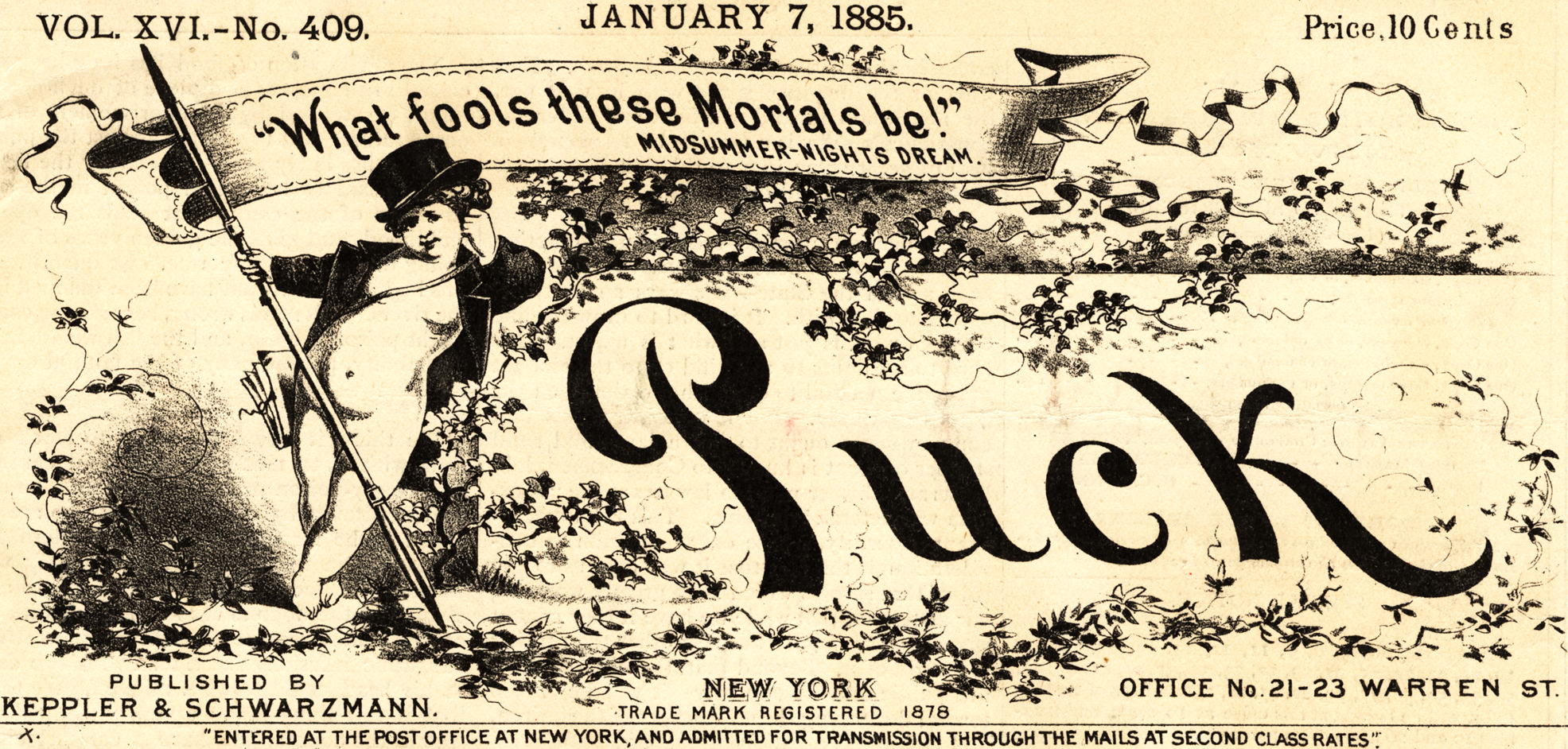
Logo for the magazine Puck, 1871-1918

- Puck (1789), a painting by Joshua Reynolds
- Puck (c. 1810–1820), a painting by Henry Fuseli.
- Puck (c. 1855–1856), a marble sculpture by Harriet Hosmer
- The Puck Building built in 1885–1888 in Nolita, New York City, features two naked statues of Puck by sculptor Henry Baerer. The building is named after and housed the 19th-century humor magazine Puck. The magazine was named after the character, and used a depiction and a quote of him as a logotype.
- Sculpture Puck, by Carl Andersson, bronze, 1912, in the Stockholm suburb of Midsommarkransen in Sweden.
- Puck by Brenda Putnam, marble, 1932, at the Folger Shakespeare Library in Washington, D.C.

=== Music ===
- French pianist and composer Claude Debussy entitled one of his piano preludes La danse de Puck (Puck's dance).

=== Literature ===
- Dear Brutus is a 1917 fantasy play by J. M. Barrie, the host "Lob" being the aged Puck from Shakespeare's play
- The 1976 play Robin Goodfellow by Aurand Harris retells A Midsummer Night's Dream from Puck's point of view.
- In Neil Gaiman's 1990 comic-book The Sandman story "'A Midsummer Night's Dream", Puck and other fairies watch Shakespeare's company of actors perform the play.
- In Michael Buckley's 2005 book series The Sister's Grimm and subsequent spin off comics and comic books.
