= Hiran Abeysekera =

Sri Lankan actor (born 1985)

- Born: 1985 (age 40–41); Sri Lanka
- Education: Royal Academy of Dramatic Art (BA)
- Occupation: Actor
- Years active: 2011–present

Hiran Abeysekera is a Sri Lankan actor. He won the Laurence Olivier Award for Best Actor for his performance in the stage adaptation of Life of Pi. On television, he is known for his roles in Russell T Davies' A Midsummer Night's Dream (2016) and the tween dance series Find Me in Paris (2018–2019).

== Early life and education ==
Abeysekera was born in Colombo and grew up during the Civil War. His father was a garage owner and his mother taught English. Abeysekera was educated at Nalanda College Colombo.

When he was 18, Abeysekera lost his friend in a tsunami. He had begun studying to become a doctor, but decided to pursue his passion of theatre because "life can end at any second". Having obtained a diploma from the Lanka Children's and Youth Theatre Foundation, he played the lead role in a British Council production of Peter Shaffer's Equus in 2007. This enabled him to audition for drama schools in the UK, following which he secured a place at the Royal Academy of Dramatic Art. He graduated in 2011.

== Career ==
Abeysekera made his professional stage debut with the English Touring Theatre in 2011, playing Valere in Tartuffe. In 2012 he joined the Royal Shakespeare Company in Stratford-Upon-Avon and was cast as Bartholomew in The Taming of the Shrew. In 2015, he played Peter Pan on the London stage.

In 2016, he returned to the Royal Shakespeare Company and played Puck in a film adaptation of A Midsummer Night's Dream, which was screened by the BBC. He played Posthumus in their stage production of Cymbeline at the Barbican Theatre London, and Horatio in Hamlet.

In 2018, Abeysekera began appearing in the Hulu series Find Me in Paris, portraying the role of Dash Khan until 2019. He played Pi Patel in the 2019 premiere of Lolita Chakrabarti's adaption of Life of Pi at the Crucible Theatre, Sheffield, for which he won a UK Theatre Award. In the same year, he was cast in the part of Leonardo da Vinci in the new play Botticelli in the Fire staged by the Hampstead Theatre, London. He then played Sunil Sharma in the play Behind the Beautiful Forevers at the Royal National Theatre.

In 2021, Abeysekera returned to the role of Pi Patel when Life of Pi transferred to the Wyndham's Theatre in London's West End. In 2022, he won the Olivier Award for Best Actor in a play for his performance. He reprised his role once again for the show's 2023 New York run at the Gerald Schoenfeld Theatre, marking his Broadway debut. He received Drama Desk and Outer Critics Circle Award nominations.

Abeysekara played the title role in William Shakespeare's Hamlet, directed by Robert Hastie in the Lyttleton Theatre at the Royal National Theatre from 25 September until 22 November 2025, as part of Indhu Rubasingham's inaugural season as artistic director.

== Filmography ==
Key
| † | Denotes projects that have not yet been released |

=== Film ===
| Year | Title | Role | Notes | Ref. |
|---|---|---|---|---|
| 2014 | Lion in the Tent | Aamir | Short film | |
| 2015 | Unleaded | Rahim | Short film | |
| 2016 | A Midsummer Night's Dream | Puck | Television film | |
| 2019 | Supervized | Celestro | | |
| 2026 | The Magic Faraway Tree | Angry Pixie | | |

=== Television ===
| Year | Title | Role | Notes | Ref. |
|---|---|---|---|---|
| 2018 | Holby City | Tyler Saba | 2 episodes | |
| 2018–19 | Find Me in Paris | Dash Khan | 27 episodes | |
| 2022 | The Good Karma Hospital | Prakash Dhatt | 1 episode | |

== Stage ==
| Year | Work | Role | Company | Notes |
|---|---|---|---|---|
| 2011 | Tartuffe | Valere | UK tour | |
| 2011 | Rats Tales | Wood cutter/Prince/Troll baby | Royal Exchange, Manchester | |
| 2012 | The Taming of the Shrew | Bartholomew | Royal Shakespeare Theatre, Stratford-upon-Avon | |
| 2013 | You In Mid Air | Theo Oakden | The Circus Space / RADA | |
| 2014 | BBC Proms 22: War Horse | Ensemble | National Theatre / Royal Albert Hall, London | |
| 2014 | Behind the Beautiful Forevers | Sunil Sharma | National Theatre, London | |
| 2015 | Peter Pan | Peter Pan | Regent's Park Open Air Theatre, London | |
| 2016 | Cymbeline | Posthumus | Royal Shakespeare Company, Barbican Theatre, London | |
| 2016 | Hamlet | Horatio | Royal Shakespeare Company | |
| 2018 | The Prisoner | Mavuso | Théâtre des Bouffes du Nord, Paris | |
| 2019 | Life of Pi | Pi Patel | Crucible Theatre, Sheffield | |
| 2019 | Akhrot | | Edinburgh Fringe Festival | |
| 2019 | Botticelli in the Fire | Leonardo da Vinci | Hampstead Theatre, London | |
| 2020 | Tempest | Wood cutter / Prince / Troll baby | Théâtre des Bouffes du Nord, Paris | |
| 2021 | Life of Pi | Pi Patel | Wyndham's Theatre, London | |
| 2023 | Life of Pi | Pi Patel | Gerald Schoenfeld Theatre, New York | |
| 2023 | The Father and the Assassin | Nathuram Godse | Olivier Theatre, Royal National Theatre | |
| 2025 | Hamlet | Hamlet | Lyttleton Theatre, Royal National Theatre | |

== Audio ==
| Year | Work | Role | Venue | Notes |
|---|---|---|---|---|
| 2013 | Broken Paradise | Reader | BBC Radio | |
| 2017 | Tuman Bay | Barakat | BBC Radio 4 | |

== Awards and nominations ==
| Year | Award | Category | Work | Result | Ref. |
|---|---|---|---|---|---|
| 2011 | Ian Charleson Awards | | Tartuffe | Nominated | |
| 2019 | UK Theatre Awards | Best Performance in a Play | Life of Pi | Won | |
| 2022 | Laurence Olivier Awards | Best Actor | Life of Pi | Won | |
