= Life of Pi (play) =

2019 play by Lolita Chakrabarti

- Production artwork
- Original language: English
- Written by: Lolita Chakrabarti (play); Yann Martel (novel)

Premiere
- Date: 28 June 2019
- Place: Crucible Theatre, Sheffield

Life of Pi is a play based on the best-selling novel of the same name by Yann Martel adapted for the stage by Lolita Chakrabarti.

The play premiered in June 2019 at the Crucible Theatre, Sheffield before transferring to the Wyndham's Theatre in London's West End in November 2021. The play won five Laurence Olivier Awards (including Best New Play), five UK Theatre Awards (including Best New Play) and Best New Play at the WhatsOnStage Awards.

== Production history ==
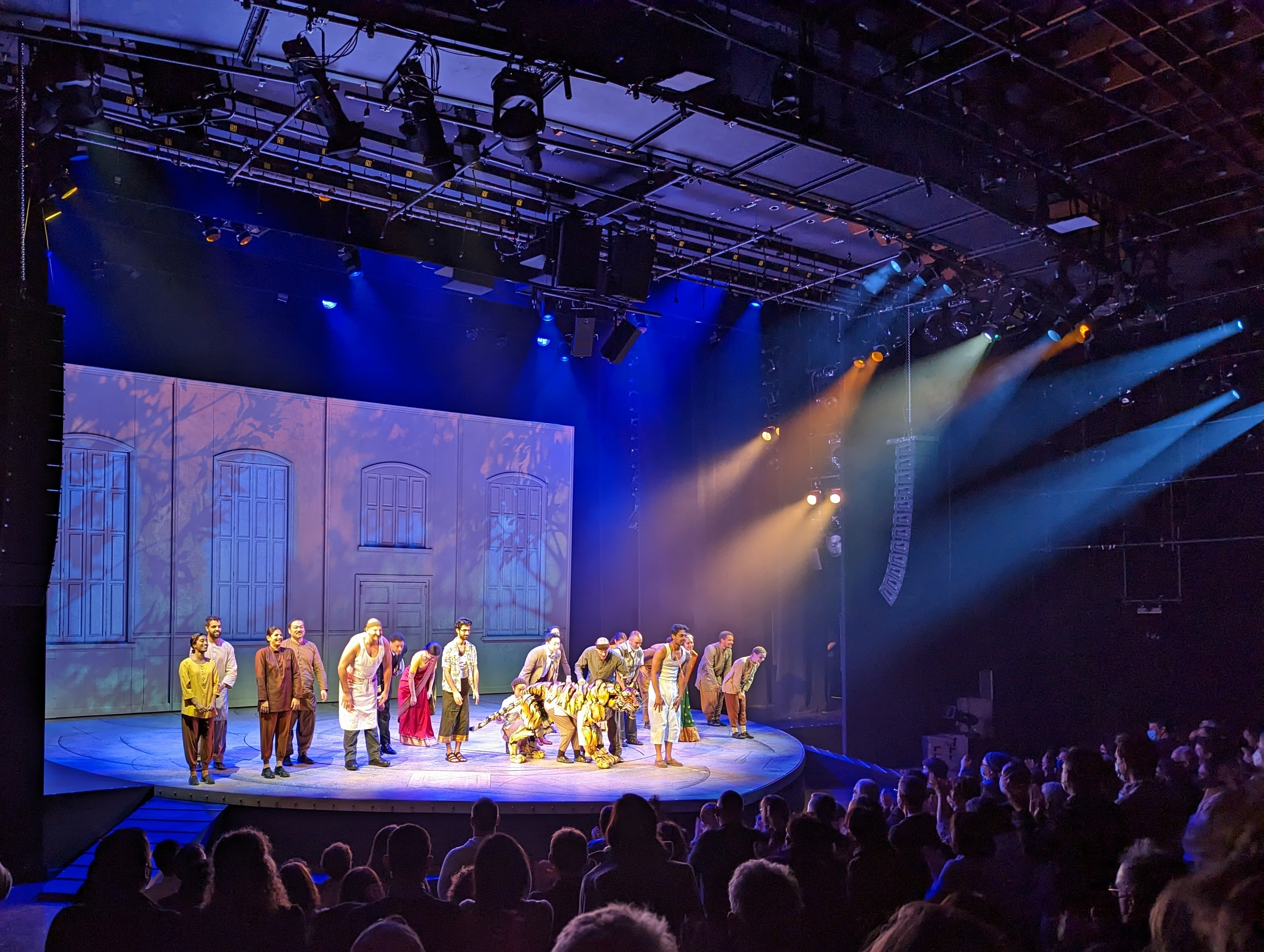
An audience ovation following a performance at the A.R.T.

=== Sheffield (2019) ===
The play was commissioned by producer Simon Friend, and after a series of workshops over two years, made its world premiere at the Crucible Theatre, Sheffield running from 28 June until 20 July 2019. The play is directed by Max Webster.

=== London (2021-2023) ===
Following the success of the Sheffield run, the play opened in London's West End at the Wyndham's Theatre, produced by Simon Friend, beginning previews on 15 November 2021, with an official opening on 2 December. The play was originally due to open in June 2020 however was postponed due to the COVID-19 pandemic. Following extensions to the run due to popular demand, the play closed on 15 January 2023. The production was filmed live by National Theatre Live and will be broadcast to cinemas from 30 March 2023.

=== A.R.T. and Broadway (2023) ===
The play made its North American premiere at the A.R.T in Cambridge, Massachusetts running from December 4, 2022 to January 29, 2023 before opening on Broadway at the Gerald Schoenfeld Theatre on March 30, 2023 (with previews from March 9). The cast from the A.R.T. run reprised their roles with Hiran Abeysekera reprising his Olivier Award-winning role as Pi (with Adi Dixit who played Pi in the A.R.T. run joining as the Alternate Pi) with Fred Davis and Scarlet Wilderink reprising their Olivier Award-winning role of Richard Parker (joining the A.R.T. puppeteering team). The Broadway production closed on July 23, 2023. Abeysekera departed the production on July 9, 2023 with Uma Paranjpe playing the title role for the remaining performances.

=== UK & Ireland Tour (2023-2024) ===
The play began a UK and Ireland tour, returning to Sheffield at the Lyceum Theatre on 29 August 2023 and is scheduled to tour until July 2024. Divesh Subaskaran is playing the title role of Pi, in his professional debut, and Romina Hytten reprising her Olivier Award winning role of Richard Parker.

=== North American Tour (2024-2025) ===
A North American tour began on December 7, 2024 at the Hippdrome Theatre in Baltimore, Maryland, and closed on October 26, 2025, at the Broward Center for the Performing Arts in Fort Lauderdale, Florida.

=== Regional productions ===
San Francisco Playhouse announced that it would be producing the play in its 2026/2027 Season, marking the first non-replica production of Life of Pi in the United States. The production was scheduled to run April 26 - June 19, 2027.

== Cast and characters ==
Character	Sheffield	London	Cambridge	Broadway	UK & Ireland Tour
Character	2019	2021	2022	2023	
Pi	Hiran Abeysekera	Hiran Abeysekera	Adi Dixit	Hiran Abeysekera	Divesh Subaskaran
Ma	Mina Anwar	Mina Anwar	Mahira Kakkar	Mahira Kakkar	Goldy Notay
Richard Parker the Tiger	Kate Colebrook; Fred Davis; Owain Gwynn	Fred Davis; Tom Larkin; Daisy Franks; Scarlet Wilderink; Romina Hytten; Tom Stacy	Fred Davis; Scarlet Wilderink; Nikki Calonge; Rowan Ian Seamus Magee; Jonathan David Martin; Betsy Rosen; Celia Mei Rubin; Andrew Wilson		Sebastian Goffin; Akash Heer; Peter Twose; Romina Hytten; Katie Kennedy-Rose; Kate Roswell; Antony Antunes; Aizah Khan
Pi's Father	Kammy Darweish	Nicholas Khan	Rajesh Bose	Rajesh Bose	Ralph Birtwell
Rani	Tara Divina	Payal Mistry	Sonya Venugopal	Sonya Venugopal	Keshini Misha
Father Martin / Commander Grant-Jones	Tom Espiner	Tom Espiner	Avery Glymph	Avery Glymph	Antony Antunes; Peter Twose
Mamaji / Pandit-Ji	Raj Ghatak	Raj Ghatak	Sathya Sridharan	Sathya Sridharan	Chand Martinez
Mrs Biology Kumar / Zaida Khan	Syreeta Kumar	Syreeta Kumar	Salma Qarnain	Salma Qarnain	Sharita Oomeer
Mr Okamoto	David K. S. Tse	David K. S. Tse	Daisuke Tsuji	Daisuke Tsuji	Lilian Tsang
The Cook / The voice of the Tiger	Habib Nasib Nader	Habib Nasib Nader	Brian Thomas Abraham	Brian Thomas Abraham	Antony Antunes; Peter Twose
Lulu Chen	Gabby Wong	Kirsten Foster	Kirstin Louie	Kirstin Louie	Bhwana Bhwasar
Ensemble			Mahnaz Damania, Usman Ali Mughal, Uma Paranjpe, David Shih	Mahnaz Damania, Jon Hoche, Usman Ali Mughal, Uma Paranjpe, David Shih	
Pi (alternate)	-	Nuwan Hugh Perera	Uma Paranjpe	Adi Dixit, Uma Paranjpe	Adwitha Arumugam

== Reception ==
The play received rave reviews from critics and audiences in both the Sheffield and London productions.

== Awards and nominations ==
=== Sheffield production ===
Year	Award	Category	Nominee	Result
2019	UK Theatre Awards	Best New Play		Won
2019	UK Theatre Awards	Best Director	Max Webster	Won
2019	UK Theatre Awards	Best Design	Nick Barnes, Finn Caldwell, Carolyn Downing, Andrzej Goulding, Tim Hatley and Tim Lutkin	Won
2019	UK Theatre Awards	Best Performance in a Play	Hiran Abeysekera	Won
2020	WhatsOnStage Awards	Best New Play		Won
2020	WhatsOnStage Awards	Best Regional Production		Nominated

=== London production ===
Year	Award	Category	Nominee	Result
2022	Laurence Olivier Awards	Best New Play		Won
2022	Laurence Olivier Awards	Best Director	Max Webster	Nominated
2022	Laurence Olivier Awards	Best Actor	Hiran Abeysekera	Won
2022	Laurence Olivier Awards	Best Actor in a Supporting Role	Fred Davis, Daisy Franks, Romina Hytten, Tom Larkin, Habib Nasib Nader, Tom Stacy and Scarlet Wilderink	Won
2022	Laurence Olivier Awards	Best Sound Design	Carolyn Downing	Nominated
2022	Laurence Olivier Awards	Best Lighting Design	Andrzej Goulding and Tim Lutkin	Won
2022	Laurence Olivier Awards	Best Set Design	Tim Hatley (set), Nick Barnes and Finn Caldwell (puppetry)	Won
2022	Laurence Olivier Awards	Best Theatre Choreographer	Finn Caldwell	Nominated
2022	Laurence Olivier Awards	Best Original Score or New Orchestrations	Andrew T. Mackay	Nominated

=== Broadway Production ===
Year	Award	Category	Nominee	Result
2023	Tony Awards	Best Direction of a Play	Max Webster	Nominated
2023	Tony Awards	Best Scenic Design of a Play	Tim Hatley and Andrzej Goulding	Won
2023	Tony Awards	Best Costume Design of a Play	Tim Hatley, Nick Barnes, and Finn Caldwell	Nominated
2023	Tony Awards	Best Lighting Design of a Play	Tim Lutkin	Won
2023	Tony Awards	Best Sound Design of a Play	Carolyn Downing	Won
2023	Drama Desk Awards	Outstanding Direction of a Play	Max Webster	Won
2023	Drama Desk Awards	Outstanding Lead Performance in a Play	Hiran Abeysekera	Nominated
2023	Drama Desk Awards	Outstanding Scenic Design of a Play	Tim Hatley	Won
2023	Drama Desk Awards	Outstanding Video or Projection Design	Andrzej Goulding	Won
2023	Drama Desk Awards	Outstanding Puppetry	Nick Barnes and Finn Caldwell	Won
2023	Drama League Awards	Outstanding Production of a Play		Nominated
2023	Drama League Awards	Distinguished Performance	Hiran Abeysekera	Nominated
2023	Theatre World Awards	Outstanding Debut Performance	Hiran Abeysekera	Won
2023	Outer Critics Circle Awards	Outstanding New Broadway Play		Nominated
2023	Outer Critics Circle Awards	Outstanding Director of a Play	Max Webster	Nominated
2023	Outer Critics Circle Awards	Outstanding Lead Performer in a Broadway Play	Hiran Abeysekera	Nominated
2023	Outer Critics Circle Awards	Outstanding Lighting Design (Play or Musical)	Tim Lutkin	Won
2023	Outer Critics Circle Awards	Outstanding Video or Projection Design (Play or Musical)	Andrzej Goulding	Won
