= Demetrius (A Midsummer Night's Dream) =

Character in A Midsummer Night's Dream

Demetrius is one of the lovers in William Shakespeare's play A Midsummer Night's Dream. He is a young man who is engaged to a young woman, Hermia, who is in love with Lysander.

== Role in A Midsummer Night's Dream ==
After Hermia has confided in Helena regarding her plans to elope with Lysander, Helena reveals the plan to Demetrius, in the hopes of gaining Demetrius's trust. However, Demetrius merely goes to the forest seeking Hermia, without giving Helena a second thought. After that, he returns to the king.

Helena follows Demetrius, and Oberon, the fairy king, sees them arguing. Oberon feels pity for Helena and decides to help her by putting love juice in Demetrius's eyes, thereby compelling Demetrius to return Helena's love. Oberon instructs Puck, another fairy, to pour love juice on the eyelids of the "Athenian man". However, Puck sees Lysander sleeping, and pours the love juice in Lysander's eyes instead, thus causing Lysander to fall in love with Helena (and abandon Hermia), while Demetrius's love for Hermia continues unaltered. Later, Puck pours the love juice into Demetrius' eyes as well, with the result that both Demetrius and Lysander fall in love with Helena and despise Hermia. They fight over Helena until Puck lulls them to sleep, and then Puck reverses the spell upon Lysander so that Lysander will love Hermia again. The spell on Demetrius, however, is not removed, and the play ends with Demetrius very much in love with Helena.

== Portrayals ==
- In the 1925 silent film called Wood Love, Demetrius is portrayed by Hans Albers.
- In the 1935 film, Demetrius is portrayed by Ross Alexander.
- In the 1968 film, Demetrius is portrayed by Michael Jayston.
- In the 1981 BBC Television Shakespeare production, produced by Jonathan Miller, Demetrius was portrayed by Nicky Henson.
- In the 1996 film directed by Adrian Noble, Demetrius is portrayed by Kevin Doyle.
- In the 1999 film, Demetrius is portrayed by Christian Bale.
- In another 1999 film directed by James Kerwin, Demetrius is portrayed by Travis Schuldt.
- In the 2002 film A Midsummer Night's Rave, the character Damon, who is portrayed by Corey Pearson, corresponds to Demetrius.
- In the 2012 Indian romcom film 10ml Love by Sharat Katariya, the character Neel, who is portrayed by Purab Kohli, corresponds to Demetrius.
- In Emma Rice's 2016 production at Shakespeare's Globe in London, Demetrius was played by Ncuti Gatwa.
