= George Treadwell =

American jazz musician

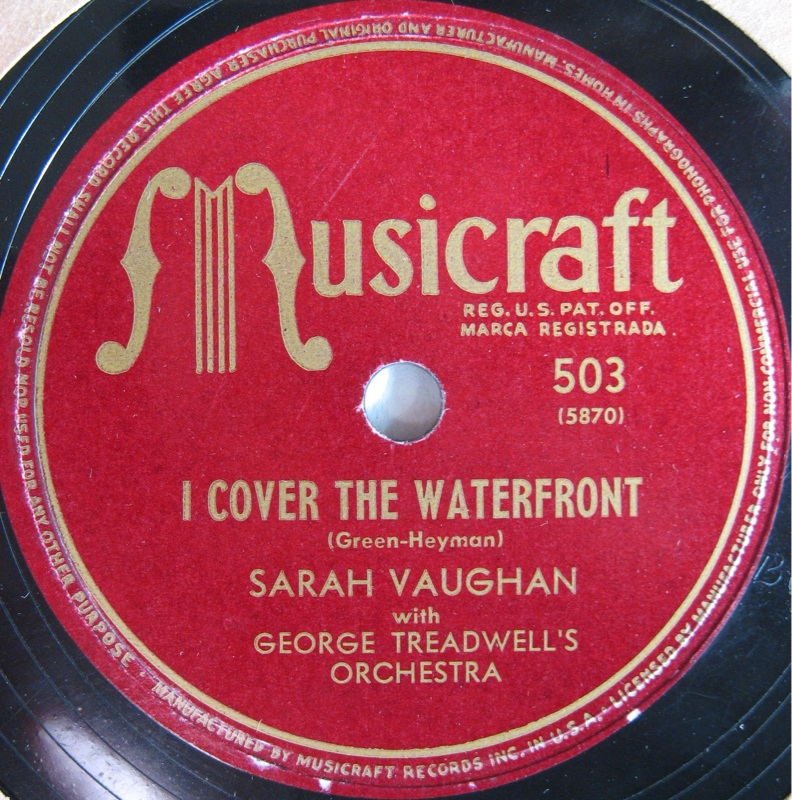
Sarah Vaughan I Cover the Waterfront with George Treadwell's Orchestra.

George McKinley Treadwell (December 21, 1918 in New Rochelle, New York – May 14, 1967 in New York City) was an American jazz musician and later the manager of the Drifters. Treadwell, an African-American, managed national recording artists in the 1940s and 1950s during a time when this was not common.

== Early career ==
Treadwell played trumpet in the house band at Monroe's in Harlem in 1941–1942, then worked with Benny Carter later in 1942 in Florida. Following stints with Ace Harris's Sunset Royals and Tiny Bradshaw, Treadwell worked with Cootie Williams (1943–1946) and J.C. Heard (1946–1947). As a member of Heard's ensemble, he accompanied Etta Jones and Sarah Vaughan, whom he married in 1947. He also recorded with Dicky Wells and Ethel Waters in 1946.

== Career in artist management ==
Treadwell quit playing music professionally late in the 1940s to work as Vaughan's manager, and continued in this capacity after their divorce in 1957. He also managed the Drifters and Ruth Brown and did artists and repertoire (A&R) work in the 1950s.

Treadwell not only managed the Drifters, but owned the trademark rights to the group's name after Drifters founder Clyde McPhatter left the group to start a solo career in 1955. As the owner of the group name, Treadwell was in a position to hire and fire the group's members, who were employees rather than co-owners of the Drifters franchise. In 1958, he fired all of the group's members and replaced them with four members of a group that had been performing as the Five Crowns. Treadwell continued to manage the group and select its members until his death in 1967.

After 1959 Treadwell also worked as a songwriter.

== Personal life ==
Treadwell was married to Sarah Vaughan from 1947 to 1957. Treadwell met Fayrene Johnson in Los Angeles and they married in 1957.

In 1967, Treadwell died suddenly, leaving his wife Faye to buy out his partners and manage the Drifters.
