= Sharat Katariya =

Indian film director and screenwriter (born 1978)

Sharat Katariya (born 15 June 1978) is an Indian film director and screenwriter.

== Career ==
Katariya started out as an assistant director to Rajat Kapoor during the making of Raghu Romeo. He also worked as a lyricist for the film. Apart from this he has written dialogues for the films Bheja Fry and Sunglass.

Sharat has also worked with Deven Khote and Kunal Vijaykar on his directorial venture Vishesh Films' Fruit and Nut.

Katariya worked as the first assistant on Rok Sako To Rok Lo. Sharat's film That's What My Dad Used to Say was shown at the Berlin International Film Festival. Sharat worked on a short film, Long Distance Call starring Ranvir Shorey. In 2006, Sharat penned lyrics for Mixed Doubles.

His directorial debut film 10 m Love (2010) was based on William Shakespeare's play A Midsummer Night's Dream, with Rajat Kapoor, Tisca Chopra and Purab Kohli as leads. Following this, he went on to direct Dum Laga Ke Haisha (2015) and Sui Dhaaga (2018).

== Filmography ==
=== Writer ===
- Bheja Fry (2007)
- Fruit and Nut (2009)
- Phillum City (2010)
- Bheja Fry 2 (2011)
- Hum Tum Shabana (2011)
- 10ml LOVE (2012)
- Sunglass (2013)
- Titli (2015)
- Fan (dialogues) (2016)
- Befikre (dialogues) (2016)

=== Director ===
- 10ml LOVE (2012)
- Dum Laga Ke Haisha (2015)
- Sui Dhaaga (2018)
