= Matt Henry (singer) =

British singer and actor

Matt Henry MBE
- Born: Birmingham, England
- Genres: Pop, gospel, soul, electronic
- Occupations: Singer, actor
- Years active: 2002–present

Matt Henry is a British singer and actor.

== Early life and education ==
Henry studied at the Roehampton University of Surrey, obtaining a Bachelors of Arts Degree in drama and sociology, before continuing theatrical training at the Urdang Academy in London.

Henry answered an open call to audition as understudy for Simba in The Lion King while he was in his second year at Urdang Academy in London. As a student, he was not supposed to audition for professional roles, but skipped his classes. When he returned, the principal summoned Henry to his office and asked where he had been. He said he was ill and the principal told him that the casting director of The Lion King called and said he had the part.

== Career ==
In 1997, Henry was chosen by the Prince's Trust to perform at the Two Nations Concert at Johannesburg Stadium in 1997 alongside the Spice Girls, Billy Ocean, and Omar.

His early West End credits include Saturday Night Fever and Avenue Q.

In 2013, Henry competed in series two of the BBC's The Voice UK, where he was mentored by both will.i.am and Jessie J. He reached the final and finished in fourth place.

In 2015, he released his debut solo album, Red Flare, which was recorded live at the studio owned by The Feeling’s Dan Gillespie and produced by Mr Hudson. He promoted the album with a UK tour supporting Cyndi Lauper.

In 2020, he originated the role of Frankie the Foetus in Jonathan Harvey's play Our Lady of Blundellsands at the Everyman Theatre, Liverpool.

In 2020, Henry co-created and starred in a musical, The Drifters Girl. The show previewed at the Theatre Royal, Newcastle, in October 2020. It delayed its original opening at the Garrick Theatre in London, due to the COVID-19 pandemic, until November 2021.

== Awards ==
Henry was appointed a Member of the Order of the British Empire (MBE) in the 2018 New Year Honours, for services to musical theatre.

== Filmography and television ==
Year	Title	Role	Notes
2012	Britain and Ireland’s Next Top Model	Himself	Runway coach
2013	The Voice UK	Himself	Contestant, fourth place
2019	Kinky Boots (musical)	Lola	
2022	Matilda the Musical	Doctor	

== Theatre credits ==
Year	Title	Role	Theatre	Location
2002	The Lion King	Simba (understudy)	Lyceum Theatre	West End
2004	Miss Saigon	John Thomas (understudy)	—N/a	UK National Tour
2005	Saturday Night Fever	Cesar	Apollo Victoria Theatre	West End
2006-2012	Avenue Q	Gary Coleman	Noël Coward Theatre	West End
2008	Hair	Hud	—N/a	UK National Tour
2009	The Lion, the Witch and the Wardrobe	Mr. Beaver	Royal & Derngate	Northampton
2009	The Frontline	Benny	Shakespeare's Globe	London
2010	The Rat Pack: Live From Las Vegas	Sammy Davis Jr.	Adelphi Theatre & UK Tour	West End & UK National Tour
2011	The Harder They Come	Ivanhoe "Ivan" Martin	Stratford East & UK Tour	Stratford & UK National Tour
2015	Red Flare		Debut studio album	
2015-17	Kinky Boots	Lola/Simon	Adelphi Theatre	London
2018	The Two Noble Kinsmen	Piritous	Globe Theatre	London
2019	One Night in Miami	Sam Cooke	—N/a	UK National Tour
2020	Our Lady of Blundellsands	Frankie The Foetus	Everyman Theatre, Liverpool	Liverpool
2021–22	The Drifters Girl	Multiple Characters	The Garrick Theatre	Newcastle and West End
2024–present	The Devil Wears Prada	Nigel	The Dominion Theatre, London	London

== Music ==
Year	Title	Note
2015	Red Flare	Debut studio album

== Accolades ==
Year	Award	Category	Result
2016	Laurence Olivier Award	Best Actor in a Musical (Kinky Boots)	Won
2016	WhatsOnStage Awards	Best Actor in a Musical (Kinky Boots)	Won
2017	Order of the British Empire	MBE	Awarded
2017	Grammy Awards	Best Musical Theater Album (Kinky Boots West End Cast Recording)	Nominated
