= Hermia =

Character in A Midsummer Night's Dream

- A Midsummer Night's Dream character
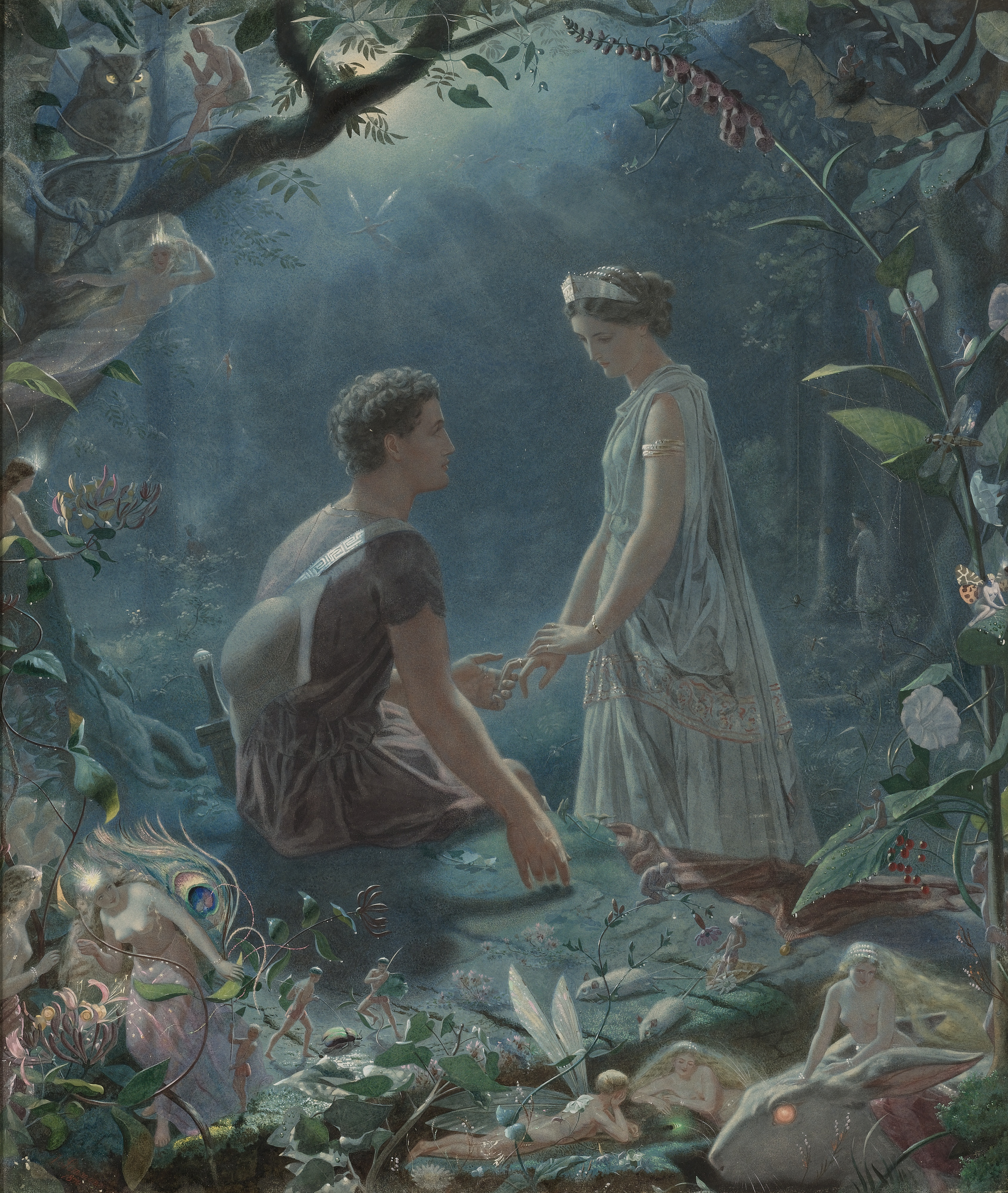
- Hermia and Lysander by John Simmons (1870)
- Created by: William Shakespeare

In-universe information
- Family: Egeus (father)

Hermia is a fictional character from Shakespeare's play, A Midsummer Night's Dream. She is a girl of ancient Athens named for Hermes, the Greek god of trade.

== Overview ==
Hermia is caught in a romantic entanglement where she loves one man, Lysander, but is being courted by another, Demetrius, whose feelings she does not return.

Though she loves Lysander, Hermia's father, Egeus, wants her to marry Demetrius and has appealed to Theseus, the Duke of Athens, for support. Under Athenian law, Hermia's refusal of her father's command would result in her being put to death or being banished to a nunnery.

Lysander and Hermia then meet Demetrius' former fiancé, and Hermia's lifelong friend, Helena while discussing their run-away plans. Demetrius had abandoned Helena to woo Hermia but Helena is still hopelessly in love with him. Hermia tells Helena not to worry; Hermia will elope with Lysander and Demetrius will no longer see her face. Helena relates Hermia's plan to Demetrius in the hope that he will realize her love for him, but Demetrius pursues Hermia and Lysander into the forest with Helena in pursuit.

Demetrius tries to persuade Helena to stop following him but Helena declares her love.

Oberon is the king of the fairies. He is invisible to humans and has been watching the story unfold. He orders his sprite, Puck, to place a drop from a magical flower on the sleeping Demetrius' eyelids so that he will fall in love with Helena when he wakes, and everyone will be content. However, Puck mistakes Lysander for Demetrius; when Lysander awakes, he sees Helena and falls deeply in love with her, forsaking Hermia. After discovering the mistake, Oberon places a drop of the magical flower on Demetrius' eyes. Demetrius awakes and his love for Helena is now rekindled; he joins Lysander in the quest for Helena's hand.

With both Demetrius and Lysander pursuing her, Helena becomes angry. Because Lysander's love for Hermia was so great and Demetrius had been wooing her in accordance with her father's wishes, Helena believes that they are cruelly mocking her. When Hermia returns to the scene, Helena accuses her of being part of the joke. Hermia feels betrayed by the accusation and asserts that she would never hurt her friend that way. Accusations and challenges fly between Lysander and Demetrius and between Helena and Hermia. Hermia now thinks the two swains prefer Helena because she is taller and offers to fight Helena. Helena asks for protection because Hermia was a scrapper in their younger years, saying, "And though she is but little, she is fierce."

Lysander and Demetrius resolve to settle their rivalry with swords and separately head further into the forest.

Wearied by the conflict and the chase, and with Puck providing some magic assistance, the four young Athenians fall asleep in the forest. Puck places the antidote on Lysander's eyes but not on Demetrius'. The four wake up the next morning when Theseus, Hippolyta, his betrothed, and Egeus find them.

This is the day Hermia is to make her choice: marry Demetrius, enter a nunnery or die. However, the lovers wake up dazed; Unable to explain how they fell asleep, they talk about a strange dream.

Demetrius, now permanently under the love flowers spell, says that he loves only Helena. With Demetrius out of the picture, Theseus overrules Egeus, freeing Hermia from her obligation. Hermia and Lysander marry each other at the wedding.

As Hermia's name comes from the god of trade, there may have been an economic reason for Demetrius' courtship and Egeus' insistence on their marriage.

In film versions, Hermia was played by Olivia de Havilland in the 1935 version and by Anna Friel in the 1999 release. Tara Sharma portrayed Shweta, a chatacter based on Hermia, in the Indian film adaptation 10ml Love (2012).
