= Egeus =

- A Midsummer Night's Dream character
- Created by: William Shakespeare

In-universe information
- Family: Hermia (daughter)

Egeus /iˈdʒiːəs/ is a character in A Midsummer Night's Dream, the comedy by William Shakespeare. He is an Athenian who tries to keep his daughter, Hermia, from marrying Lysander (the man she loves). In original performances, the actor for his role probably played the part of Philostrate as well. Egeus wants Hermia to marry Demetrius.

== Role in the play ==
Appearing in Act I, Scene 1 and Act IV, Scene 1, Egeus is the father of Hermia, who disapproves of Hermia and Lysander's love, appealing to Theseus to force Hermia to marry Demetrius. If Hermia refuses to wed Demetrius, she could be put to death, or cloistered in a nunnery for the rest of her life — both of these sentences are supported by Athenian law.

== Criticism ==
Egeus plays a key part in illustrating the love play's theme of law versus love, and reason versus imagination. Constantly refusing his daughter's plea to marry the man she loves, Lysander, he demands that she be forced to marry Demetrius. He goes so far as to say that if she disobeys, he as a father has a right to kill her, or to force her into a convent as a nun for life. Hermia embodies the opposition to the law and reason of her father. She follows her feelings and imagination regarding Lysander, rather than strictly adhering to her father's will (thus his preferential disposition towards Demetrius).

== Performances ==
In original performance A Midsummer Night's Dream, the actor for Egeus and Philostrate were probably one and the same. This can be gathered through discrepancies between the First Folio and earlier quarto versions of the play. In Act V, scene 1, for example, the quartos say "Call Philostrate", while the 1623 Folio says "Call Egeus". One actor filling both roles also explains some of the jumbled dialogue in this scene, as it was probably the result of confusion over the role the actor was playing at the time. Furness interprets this a little differently, saying that Shakespeare may not have originally intended both roles to be played by the same person, but that directors combined the roles to save money. Act V, scene 1 is the only scene in which both men are present at the same time. Philostrate, as the less-important one, would thus probably have been stricken out, while Egeus would have filled both roles. This change in staging would reveal an alteration from Shakespeare's original text.
