= John Simmons (painter) =

English painter

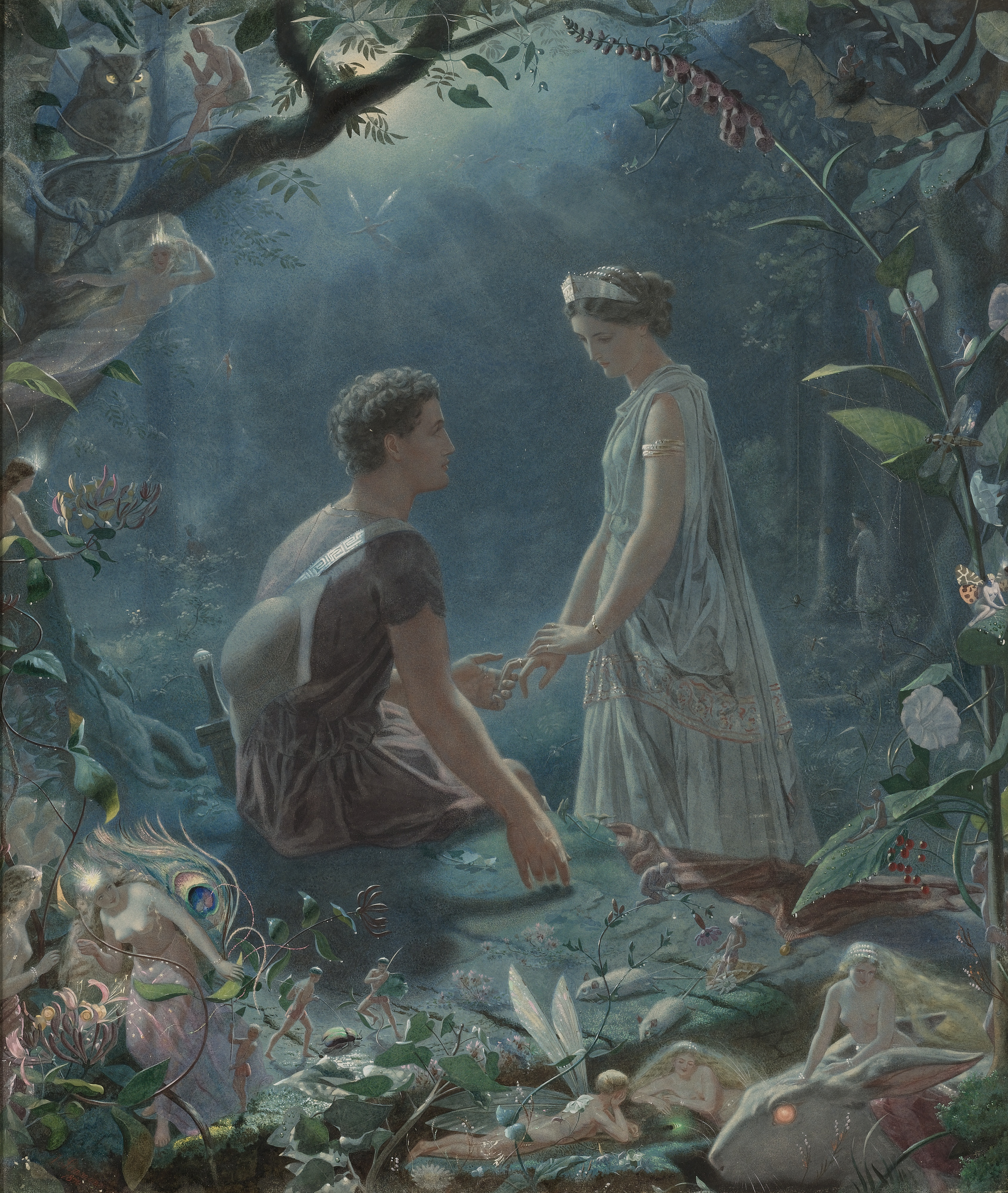
Hermia and Lysander. A Midsummer Night's Dream (1870)

John Simmons (1823–1876) was a British miniature painter and illustrator, known primarily for his watercolours of ethereal fairyland scenes, often illustrating Shakespearian or other literary works (such as his illustrations for A Midsummer Night's Dream). He was one of several popular Victorian artists who together created "a genre of forest idyll" in their fairy paintings. They are often grouped with the Pre-Raphaelites. Simmons lived in Bristol, and also painted portraits. He was elected to membership of the Bristol Academy of the Fine Arts in 1849. He died in November 1876 and is buried at Arnos Vale Cemetery.

== Fairy painting ==
The typical fairy painting is strongly rooted in the literary influences of Romanticism, as well as in the Victorian cultural period. Among the most significant of these influences were the themes of Shakespeare's A Midsummer Night's Dream and The Tempest. Other literary works, such as Edmund Spenser's The Faerie Queene and Alexander Pope's The Rape of the Lock have been cited as contributing influences as well.

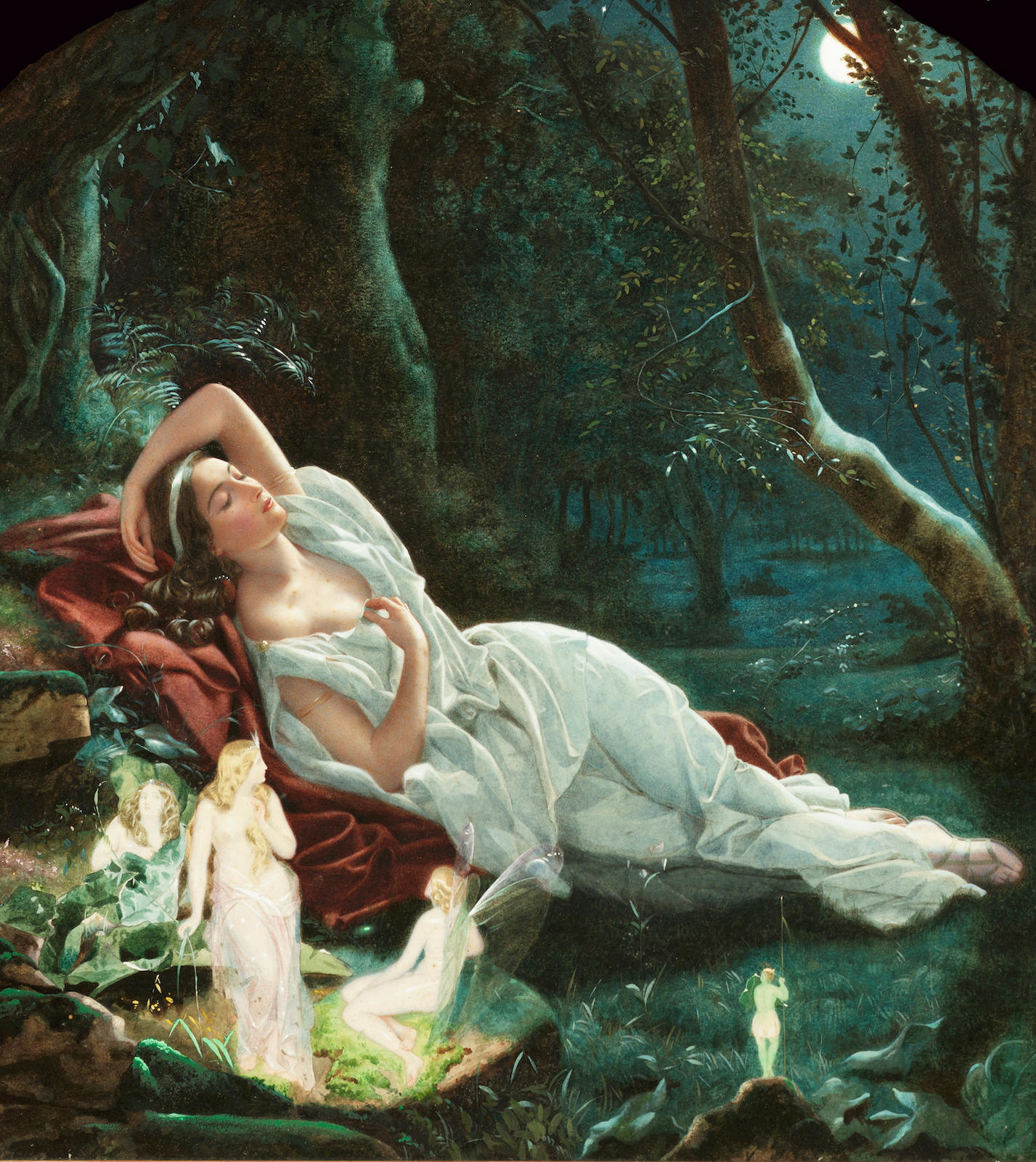
Titania Sleeping in the Moonlight Protected by Her Fairies (unknown date)

Simmons is best known as a specialist in painting female fairies, frequently nude. Bonhams auctioneers described his 1873 depiction of A Midsummer Night's Dream as "one of the finest and most ambitious examples." Interest in the fairy painting genre saw a revival in the 19th-century allowing observers of the imaginary world shown in the paintings a respite from the austerity of the Victorian way of life. The majority of Simmons' paintings are simple and generally portray one or two main figures set within a framework of foliage; Titania was frequently a subject of his artwork, shown delicately draped in a variety of poses. According to Bonhams he portrays "the fairy queen as a paradigm of Victorian female beauty" adding "Using the winding flowers and convolvulus as a decorative motif, Simmons romantically frames the central figures, creating a stage in which their narrative can play out. Blurring the boundaries between reality and dreams, he creates a poetical vision of Shakespeare's play".

Some of Simmons' images of Titania illustrate the increasing sexualisation of fairy queens. According to Christopher Wood, an expert in Victorian art, Simmons' technique demonstrated influence from Joseph Noel Paton, who utilised a very detailed style. Wood also suggested further influence for Simmons' style came from William Edward Frost and William Etty. Simmons' paintings of fairies are given a surreal effect by his skilful use of light and the realistic detail he adopts for portraying the animals and plants. Wood described Simmons' A Fairy among Convolvulus as "a typical Simmons pin-up" and hypothesises the paintings were "distinctly titillating". Other pieces of artwork by Simmons with a fairy theme include: Hermia and the Fairies, which was also based on Shakespeare's A Midsummer Night's Dream and completed in 1861; The Honey Bee Steals from the Bumble Bees; and The Evening Star.
