= Faye Treadwell =

Manager of The Drifters

- Born: September 5, 1926; Okolona, Arkansas
- Died: May 22, 2011 (aged 84)
- Occupation: Talent manager
- Years active: 1967–2001
- Known for: Association with The Drifters
- Spouse: George Treadwell (m. 1957; died 1967)
- Children: 1

Faye Treadwell (born Fayrene Lavern Johnson, 5 September 1926 - 22 May 2011) was the manager of The Drifters. Treadwell was one of the first African-American female managers.

== Early life ==
Fayrene Johnson was born on 5 September 1926 in Okolona, Arkansas to a schoolteacher and a Baptist minister. She was the eldest of their four children. She graduated from Arkansas Baptist College and went to work in education, for the Los Angeles School Board.

In 1957, she married George Treadwell, a manager whose clients included Sarah Vaughan, Billie Holiday and Dinah Washington. He had recently begun managing The Drifters. George died suddenly in 1967, at which point Faye Treadwell bought out his partners and took control of The Drifters.

Treadwell took The Drifters to London in the 1970s and was based there for 30 years, in addition to having a home in Englewood, New Jersey.

Treadwell fought many legal battles over the rights to The Drifters' name.

Treadwell retired in 2001 due to ill health.

== Death and commemoration ==
Treadwell died of complications of breast cancer on 22 May 2011. Her daughter Tina Treadwell took over managing the legacy of The Drifters.

In November 2021, The Drifters Girl opened at the Garrick Theatre, telling the story of Faye Treadwell's life via a musical.
