= Lysander (A Midsummer Night's Dream) =

Character in A Midsummer Night's Dream

- A Midsummer Night's Dream character
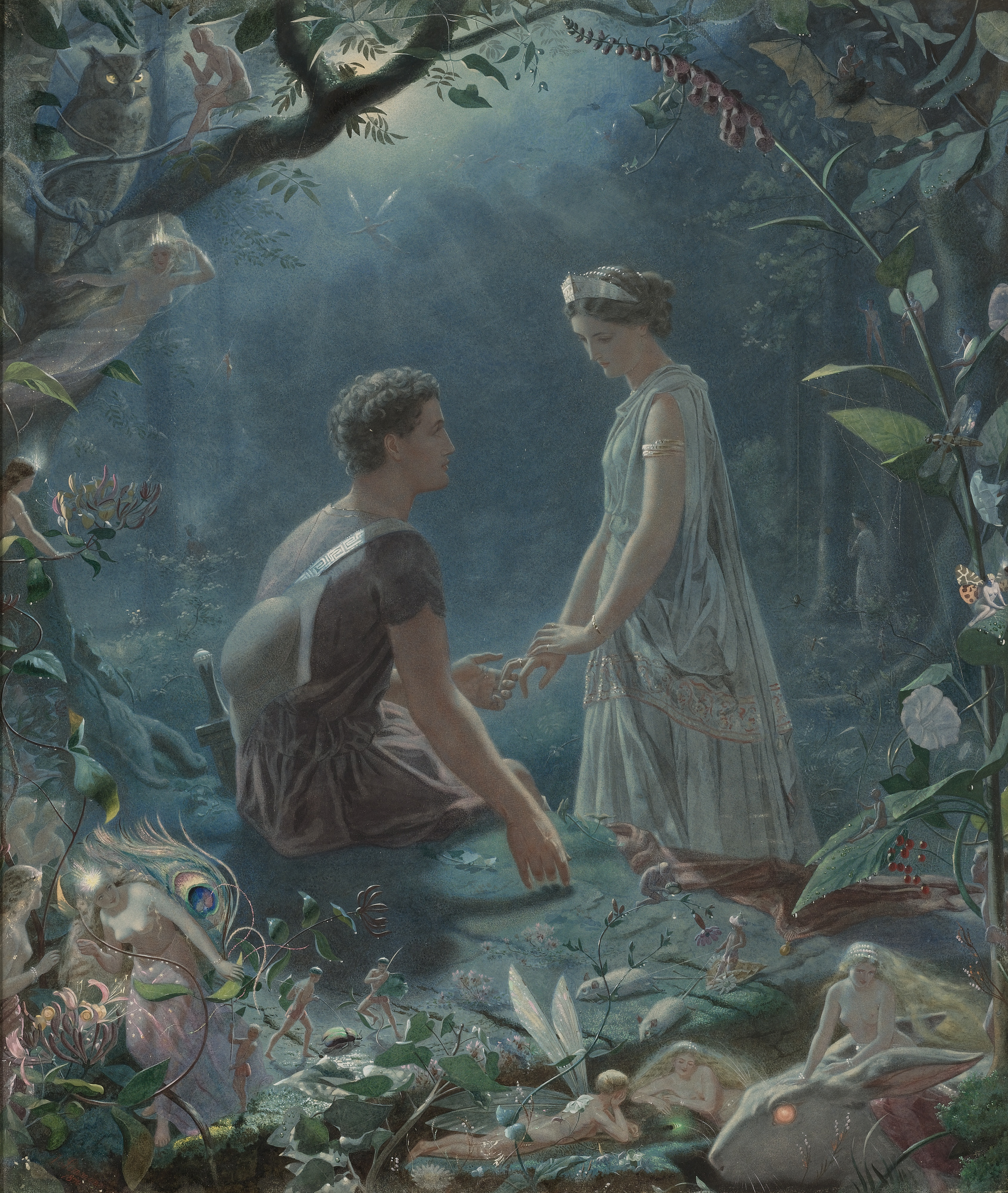
- Hermia and Lysander by John Simmons (1870)
- Created by: William Shakespeare

Lysander is a fictional character in William Shakespeare's play A Midsummer Night's Dream.

A handsome young man of Athens, Lysander is in love with Egeus's daughter Hermia. However, Egeus does not approve of Lysander and prefers his daughter to marry a man called Demetrius. Meanwhile, Hermia's friend Helena has fallen in love with Demetrius. When Hermia is forced to choose between dying, becoming a nun, or marrying Demetrius by the next full moon, she and Lysander run away into the forest near Athens. After Lysander is put under Puck's spell, being mistaken for Demetrius he falls in love with Helena, but Helena loves Demetrius. Eventually, the spell is reversed and Lysander marries Hermia. There is a party at the end where the Mechanicals perform their play and Hermia and Lysander get married.
