= List of songwriter collaborations =

This is a list of notable songwriter teams.

== Rock, soul and pop ==
Collaborators	Period	Songs
Kalmar and Ruby Bert Kalmar (lyrics) Harry Ruby (music)	1920–1947	"Who's Sorry Now?" "I Wanna Be Loved by You" "Three Little Words"
Livingston and Evans Jay Livingston (music) Ray Evans (lyrics)	1940–2002	"Silver Bells" "Buttons and Bows" "Mona Lisa" "Que Sera, Sera" "Tammy"
Sid Tepper and Roy C. Bennett	1948–1970	"Red Roses for a Blue Lady" "Suzy Snowflake" "The Naughty Lady of Shady Lane" "Twenty Tiny Fingers" "Nuttin' for Christmas" "Kewpie Doll" "Travellin' Light" "G.I. Blues" "The Young Ones" "Puppet on a String"
Felice and Boudleaux Bryant	1949–1987	"Bye Bye Love" "Wake Up, Little Susie" "Rocky Top"
Adler and Ross Richard Adler (lyrics) Jerry Ross (music)	1950–1955	"Rags to Riches" "Hey There" "Hernando's Hideaway" "Steam Heat" "Whatever Lola Wants" "Heart" "I'm Not at All in Love"
Leiber and Stoller Jerry Leiber (lyrics) Mike Stoller (music)	1950–1975	For a more complete listing, see List of songs written by Jerry Leiber and Mike Stoller. "Hound Dog" "Jailhouse Rock" "Kansas City" "Searchin'" "Charlie Brown" "Stand By Me" (with Ben E. King) "Pearl's a Singer" (with Ralph Dino and John Sembello)
Sherman Brothers Robert B. Sherman Richard M. Sherman	1951–2000	"It's a Small World (After All)" "Supercalifragilisticexpialidocious" "Chim Chim Cher-ee" "A Spoonful of Sugar" "Feed the Birds" "Let's Go Fly a Kite" "Chitty Chitty Bang Bang" "I Wanna Be Like You" (from The Jungle Book) "The Aristocats" "You're Sixteen" "Winnie the Pooh" "The Wonderful Thing About Tiggers" "Your Heart Will Lead You Home" (with Kenny Loggins, from The Tigger Movie)
Alan and Marilyn Bergman	1956–2022	"The Windmills of Your Mind" (with Michel Legrand) "The Way We Were" (with Marvin Hamlisch) "It Might Be You" (with Dave Grusin) "In the Heat of the Night" (with Quincy Jones) "All His Children" (with Henry Mancini)
Doc Pomus and Mort Shuman	1957–1964	For a more complete listing, see List of songs written by Doc Pomus and Mort Shuman. "Save the Last Dance for Me" "This Magic Moment" "A Teenager in Love" "Suspicion" "Viva Las Vegas"
Lennon and McCartney of The Beatles John Lennon Paul McCartney	1957–1969	For a listing, see Category:Songs written by Lennon–McCartney.
Burt Bacharach (music) and Hal David (lyrics)	1957–1973	See also: List of songs written by Burt Bacharach "Alfie" "Raindrops Keep Fallin' on My Head" "This Guy's in Love with You" "(They Long to Be) Close to You" "Walk On By" "The Look of Love" "One Less Bell to Answer" "Do You Know the Way to San Jose"
Boyce and Hart Tommy Boyce Bobby Hart	1959–1976	"Come a Little Bit Closer" (with Wes Farrell) "(Theme From) The Monkees" "Last Train to Clarksville" "I Wonder What She's Doing Tonight"
Gerry Goffin and Carole King	1959–1976	See also: List of songs with lyrics by Gerry Goffin "Will You Love Me Tomorrow" "The Loco-Motion" "One Fine Day" "Up on the Roof" "(You Make Me Feel Like) A Natural Woman"
Mann and Weil Barry Mann (music) Cynthia Weil (lyrics)	1960–1997	For a more complete listing, see List of songs written by Barry Mann and Cynthia Weil. "Bless You" "On Broadway" (with Jerry Leiber and Mike Stoller) "We Gotta Get Out of This Place" "(You're My) Soul and Inspiration" "You've Lost That Lovin' Feelin'" "Somewhere Out There" (with James Horner, from An American Tail) "Whatever You Imagine" (with James Horner, from The Pagemaster) "Reach for the Light" (with James Horner, from Balto) "Love Led Us Here" (from Muppet Treasure Island) "I Will Always Be With You" (from All Dogs Go to Heaven 2) "I Will Come to You" (with Isaac Hanson, Taylor Hanson and Zac Hanson)
Jeff Barry and Ellie Greenwich	1962–1966	For a more complete listing, see List of songs written by Jeff Barry and Ellie Greenwich. "Da Doo Ron Ron" (with Phil Spector) "Be My Baby" (with Phil Spector) "Leader of the Pack" (with Shadow Morton) "Do Wah Diddy Diddy" "Chapel of Love" (with Phil Spector) "River Deep, Mountain High" (with Phil Spector)
Tony Renis (music) and Alberto Testa (lyrics)	1962–1998	"Quando, quando, quando" (with Mogol) "Uno per tutte" (with Mogol) "Grande, grande, grande" "The Prayer" (with David Foster and Carole Bayer Sager, from Quest for Camelot)
Holland, Dozier and Holland Brian Holland and Lamont Dozier (music) Eddie Holland (lyrics)	1962–2009	For a more complete listing, see List of songs written by Holland, Dozier and Holland. "(Love Is Like a) Heat Wave" "Can I Get a Witness" "Where Did Our Love Go" "Baby Love" "How Sweet It Is (To Be Loved by You)" "Stop! In the Name of Love" "I Hear a Symphony" "You Can't Hurry Love"
Barry, Robin and Maurice Gibb of Bee Gees (and also for other artists)	1963–2001	"Massachusetts" "I've Gotta Get a Message to You" "How Can You Mend a Broken Heart" "Jive Talkin'" "How Deep Is Your Love" "Night Fever" "Stayin' Alive" "Too Much Heaven" "Tragedy" "Islands in the Stream"
Gamble and Huff Kenny Gamble Leon Huff	1964–1984	For a more complete listing, see List of songs written by Kenny Gamble and Leon Huff. "If You Don't Know Me by Now" "Love Train" "Me and Mrs. Jones" (with Cary Gilbert) "TSOP (The Sound of Philadelphia)"
Ashford and Simpson Nickolas Ashford Valerie Simpson	1964–2011	For a more complete listing, see List of songs written by Ashford & Simpson. "Ain't No Mountain High Enough" "You're All I Need to Get By" "Ain't Nothing Like the Real Thing" "Reach Out and Touch (Somebody's Hand)"
Jagger and Richards of The Rolling Stones Mick Jagger Keith Richards	1964–2026	"(I Can't Get No) Satisfaction" "Paint It, Black" "Honky Tonk Women"
Isaac Hayes and David Porter	1965–1972	For a more complete listing, see List of songs written by Isaac Hayes and David Porter. "Hold On, I'm Comin'" "When Something Is Wrong with My Baby" "Soul Man" "I Thank You"
Barrett Strong and Norman Whitfield	1966–1972	See also: List of songs written by Norman Whitfield "I Heard It Through the Grapevine" "War" "Just My Imagination (Running Away with Me)" "Smiling Faces Sometimes" "Papa Was a Rollin' Stone"
Randy Bachman and Burton Cummings of The Guess Who	1966–2026	"These Eyes" "No Time" "American Woman" (with Garry Peterson and Jim Kale) "No Sugar Tonight/New Mother Nature"
Benny Andersson and Björn Ulvaeus of ABBA and post-ABBA (sometimes written with Stig Anderson)	1966–present	For a more complete listing, see Category:Songs written by Benny Andersson and Björn Ulvaeus. "Waterloo" "SOS" "Mamma Mia" "Fernando" "Dancing Queen"
Barry Hay and George Kooymans of Golden Earring	1967–2021	"Radar Love" "When the Lady Smiles" "Twilight Zone"
David Gilmour and Roger Waters of Pink Floyd	1968–1979	"Comfortably Numb" "Wish You Were Here" "Run Like Hell" "Dogs"
Elton John (music) and Bernie Taupin (lyrics)	1968–present	"Your Song" "Crocodile Rock" "Daniel" "Bennie and the Jets" "Don't Let the Sun Go Down on Me" "Rocket Man" "Don't Go Breaking My Heart" "Something About the Way You Look Tonight"/"Candle in the Wind 1997" "Hello Hello" (from Gnomeo & Juliet) "Stronger Than I Ever Was" (from Sherlock Gnomes) "(I'm Gonna) Love Me Again" (from Rocketman) "Hold Me Closer" (with Andrew Watt and Cirkut) "Never Too Late" (with Brandi Carlile and Andrew Watt, from Elton John: Never Too Late)
Noddy Holder and Jim Lea of Slade	1969-1991	For a more complete listing, see Slade. "Coz I Luv You" "Mama Weer All Crazee Now" "Cum On Feel the Noize" "Skweeze Me, Pleeze Me" "Merry Xmas Everybody" "Far Far Away" "How Does It Feel" "My Oh My"
Rick Davies and Roger Hodgson of Supertramp	1970–1983	"Babaji" "Bloody Well Right" "Breakfast in America" "Dreamer" "Give a Little Bit" "Goodbye Stranger" "It's Raining Again" "My Kind of Lady" "Take the Long Way Home" "The Logical Song"
Walter Becker and Donald Fagen of Steely Dan	1971–2017	"Do It Again" "Rikki Don't Lose That Number" "Reelin' In the Years" "Peg" "Hey Nineteen"
Barry Manilow (music) and Bruce Sussman (lyrics)	1972–present	"Bandstand Boogie" (with Charles Albertine) "Jump Shout Boogie" "Copacabana (At the Copa)" (with Jack Feldman) "I Made It Through the Rain" (with Gerard Kenny, Drey Shepperd and Jack Feldman) "Sweet Heaven (I'm in Love Again)" (with Jack Feldman, from Copacabana) "A Little Travelling Music, Please" (with Jack Feldman) "Let Me Be Your Wings" (with Jack Feldman, from Thumbelina) "Now and Forever" (from The Pebble and the Penguin) "Harmony" "A Gift of Love" "This Is My Town" "Touched by an Angel"
Carol Connors and Ayn Robbins	1976–1977	"Gonna Fly Now" (with Bill Conti, from Rocky) "Someone's Waiting for You" (with Sammy Fain, from The Rescuers)
Joe Strummer and Mick Jones of The Clash	1976–2002	"London Calling" "Rock the Casbah"
Marvin Hamlisch (music) and Carole Bayer Sager (lyrics)	1977–1987	"Break It to Me Gently" "Nobody Does It Better" (from The Spy Who Loved Me) "They're Playing Our Song" "Through the Eyes of Love" (from Ice Castles) "If You Remember Me" (from The Champ) "Maybe" (with Burt Bacharach, from Romantic Comedy) "The Minute I Saw You" (with David Foster and John Parr, from Three Men and a Baby)
Nile Rodgers and Bernard Edwards of Chic	1977–1992	"Dance, Dance, Dance (Yowsah, Yowsah, Yowsah)" (with Kenny Lehman) "Le Freak" "Good Times" "We Are Family"
Andrew Farriss and Michael Hutchence of INXS	1977–1997	"Original Sin" "What You Need" "Need You Tonight" "New Sensation" "Never Tear Us Apart"
Bryan Adams and Jim Vallance	1978–1989	"Cuts Like a Knife" "This Time" "Run to You" "Somebody" "Heaven" "Summer of '69" "One Night Love Affair" "It's Only Love" "Heat of the Night" "Hearts on Fire"
Adam Ant and Marco Pirroni	1980–present	"Kings of the Wild Frontier" "Dog Eat Dog" "Antmusic" "Stand and Deliver" "Prince Charming" "Ant Rap" "Goody Two Shoes" "Friend or Foe" "Desperate But Not Serious"
John Wetton and Geoff Downes of Asia	1981–2017	"Heat of the Moment" "Only Time Will Tell" "Don't Cry" "Go"
James Hetfield and Lars Ulrich of Metallica	1981–present	"Seek & Destroy" "For Whom the Bell Tolls" (with Cliff Burton) "Master of Puppets" (with Cliff Burton and Kirk Hammett) "One" "Enter Sandman" (with Kirk Hammett) "Sad but True" "Nothing Else Matters" "Until It Sleeps" "Hero of the Day" "The Memory Remains" "Some Kind of Monster" (with Kirk Hammett and Bob Rock) "The Day That Never Comes" (with Kirk Hammett and Robert Trujillo)
Neil Tennant and Chris Lowe of Pet Shop Boys	1981–present	"West End Girls" "It's a Sin" "What Have I Done to Deserve This?" (with Allee Willis)
Martin Gore (lyrics) and Alan Wilder (music) of Depeche Mode	1982–1995	"Enjoy the Silence" "Shake the Disease" "Personal Jesus" "People Are People"
Steven Morrissey (lyrics) and Johnny Marr (music) of The Smiths	1983–1987	"How Soon Is Now?" "This Charming Man" "Bigmouth Strikes Again" "There Is a Light That Never Goes Out"
Dan Hartman and Charlie Midnight	1984–1990	"Heart of the Beat" (from Breakin') "We Are the Young" "Second Nature" "Get Outta Town" (from Fletch) "Living in America" (from Rocky IV) "Waiting to See You" (from Ruthless People) "Gravity" "How Do You Stop" "Why Should I Worry?" (from Oliver & Company) "9.95" (from Teenage Mutant Ninja Turtles)
Stock Aitken Waterman Mike Stock Matt Aitken Pete Waterman	1984–1991	See also: List of songs produced by Stock Aitken Waterman "Respectable" (Mel and Kim) "Never Gonna Give You Up" "I Should Be So Lucky" "Together Forever" "Especially for You" "This Time I Know It's for Real" (with Donna Summer) "Too Many Broken Hearts" "Hand on Your Heart" "You'll Never Stop Me Loving You"
Jack Black and Kyle Gass of Tenacious D	1986–present	"Tribute" "Wonderboy" "Fuck Her Gently" "POD" (from Tenacious D in The Pick of Destiny) "Video Games"
James Horner (music) and Will Jennings (lyrics)	1988–2001	"If We Hold On Together" (from The Land Before Time) "Dreams to Dream" (from An American Tail: Fievel Goes West) "Once Upon A Time With Me" (from Once Upon a Forest) "My Heart Will Go On" (from Titanic) "I Want to Spend My Lifetime Loving You" (from The Mask of Zorro) "Then You Look at Me" (from Bicentennial Man) "Where Are You Christmas?" (with Mariah Carey, from How the Grinch Stole Christmas) "All Love Can Be" (from A Beautiful Mind)
David Foster (music) and Linda Thompson (lyrics)	1988–2011	"And When She Danced" (from Stealing Home) "Listen to Me" (with Will Jennings) "Grown-Up Christmas List" "No Explanation" (with Bill LaBounty and Beckie Foster, from Pretty Woman) "Voices That Care" (with Peter Cetera) "I Have Nothing" (from The Bodyguard) "Goodbye" "Where Do We Go from Here" (with Evan Kopelson and Douglas Pashley) "The Power of the Dream" (with Babyface) "Tell Him" (with Walter Afanasieff) "The Power of the Dream" (with Babyface) "Miracle" "State of My Heart" (with Carole Bayer Sager) "Dream with Me" (with Jackie Evancho)
Dwiki Dharmawan and Ags. Arya Dipayana	1992–2002	"Dengan Menyebut Nama Allah"
A. R. Rahman (music) and Gulzar (lyrics)	1998–2023	"Chaiyya Chaiyya" (from Dil Se..) "Tere Bina" (from Guru) "Jai Ho" (with Tanvi Shah, from Slumdog Millionaire) "Ranjha Ranjha" (from Raavan) "Challa" (from Jab Tak Hai Jaan) "Meri Pukaar Suno" "Mera Aasmaan Jal Gaya" (from Ponniyin Selvan: II)
Jay Chou (music) and Vincent Fang (lyrics)	2000–present	"Common Jasmine Orange"; "Blue and White Porcelain"; "Shouldn't Be"; "Love Confession"; "Won't Cry"; "I Truly Believe"; "Still Wandering"
Diane Warren and James Newton Howard	2001–present	"Where the Dream Takes You" (from Atlantis: The Lost Empire)
Beyoncé and Jay-Z of The Carters	2003–present	For a more complete listing, see The Carters. "Crazy in Love" "Lose My Breath" "Déjà Vu" "Drunk in Love" "Shining" "Apeshit" "Black Parade" "Alien Superstar"
Alan Silvestri (music) and Glen Ballard (lyrics)	2004–present	"Believe" (from The Polar Express) "A Hero Comes Home" (from Beowulf) "Butterfly Fly Away" (from Hannah Montana: The Movie) "God Bless Us Everyone" (from A Christmas Carol) "Shine Your Way" (with Chris Sanders and Kirk DeMicco, from The Croods) "It's Only a Matter of Time" (from Back to the Future: The Musical) "I Will Always Dance" (from Pinocchio)
Billie Eilish and Finneas O'Connell	2015–present	"Bad Guy" "Happier Than Ever" "No Time to Die" "Nobody Like U" (from Turning Red) "What Was I Made For?" (from Barbie) "Birds of a Feather" "Wildflower"

== Jazz ==
Collaborators	Period	Songs
George (music) and Ira Gershwin (lyrics)	1918–1937	"The Man I Love" "I Got Rhythm" "'S Wonderful"
Rodgers and Hart Richard Rodgers (music) Lorenz Hart (lyrics)	1919–1943	
Duke Ellington and Billy Strayhorn	1939–1966	
Coleman and Leigh Cy Coleman (music) Carolyn Leigh (lyrics)	1957–1962	"Witchcraft" "Firefly" (from Gypsy) "The Best Is Yet to Come" "Hey, Look Me Over" (from Wildcat) "I've Got Your Number" (from Little Me) "Pass Me By" (from Father Goose)
Pat Metheny and Lyle Mays	1977-2005	

== Musicals ==
Collaborators	Period	Musicals
Rodgers and Hart Richard Rodgers (music) Lorenz Hart (lyrics)	1919–1943	Fly with Me (with Oscar Hammerstein II); Poor Little Ritz Girl (with Sigmund Romberg and Alex Gerber); The Garrick Gaieties; Dearest Enemy; The Girl Friend; Betsy; Peggy-Ann; The Fifth Avenue Follies; Lido Lady; The Garrick Gaieties; A Connecticut Yankee; One Dam Thing After Another; Present Arms; Chee-Chee; She's My Baby; Heads Up! Spring Is Here; Ever Green; Simple Simon; America's Sweetheart; Love Me Tonight; The Phantom President; Hallelujah, I'm a Bum; Mississippi; Jumbo; On Your Toes; The Show Is On; Babes in Arms; I'd Rather Be Right; The Boys from Syracuse; I Married an Angel; Too Many Girls; Higher and Higher; Pal Joey; Two Weeks with Pay; By Jupiter; A Connecticut Yankee
Kern and Hammerstein Jerome Kern (music) Oscar Hammerstein II (lyrics)	1925–1939	Sunny (with Otto Harbach); Show Boat; Sweet Adeline; Music in the Air; Three Sisters; Very Warm for May
Frank Churchill (music) and Larry Morey (lyrics)	1937–1942	Snow White and the Seven Dwarfs; Bambi; The Adventures of Ichabod and Mr. Toad (with Charles Wolcott, Ray Gilbert, Robert Burns, Don Raye and Gene de Paul)
Harold Arlen (music) and Johnny Mercer (lyrics)	1942–1959	Star Spangled Rhythm; The Sky's the Limit; Here Come the Waves; The Petty Girl; St. Louis Woman; Saratoga
Lerner and Loewe Alan Jay Lerner (lyrics) Frederick Loewe (music)	1942–1960; 1970–1972	Life of the Party; What's Up? The Day Before Spring; Brigadoon; Paint Your Wagon; My Fair Lady; Gigi; Camelot; The Little Prince
Rodgers and Hammerstein Richard Rodgers (music) Oscar Hammerstein II (lyrics)	1943–1960	Oklahoma! Carousel; State Fair; Allegro; South Pacific; The King and I Me and Juliet; Pipe Dream; Cinderella; Flower Drum Song; The Sound of Music; A Grand Night for Singing
Comden and Green Betty Comden Adolph Green	1944–2002	On the Town (with Leonard Bernstein); Billion Dollar Baby (with Morton Gould); Good News (with Ray Henderson, Lew Brown, Buddy G. DeSylva, Roger Edens, Hugh Martin and Ralph Blane); Two on the Aisle (with Jule Styne); Wonderful Town (with Leonard Bernstein); Peter Pan (with Jule Styne, Mark Charlap, Trude Rittmann and Carolyn Leigh); It's Always Fair Weather (with André Previn); Bells Are Ringing (with Jule Styne); Say, Darling (with Jule Styne); A Party with Betty Comden and Adolph Green (with Leonard Bernstein, Jule Styne, André Previn, Saul Chaplin, Roger Edens and Cy Coleman); Do Re Mi (with Jule Styne); Subways Are for Sleeping (with Jule Styne); Fade Out – Fade In (with Jule Styne); Hallelujah, Baby! (with Jule Styne); Lorelei (with Jule Styne and Leo Robin); On the Twentieth Century (with Cy Coleman); A Doll's Life (with Larry Grossman); The Will Rogers Follies (with Larry Grossman)
Adler and Ross Richard Adler (lyrics) Jerry Ross (music)	1950–1955	John Murray Anderson's Almanac (with Cy Coleman, Michael Grace, Joseph McCarthy, Henry Sullivan, John Rox, Bart Howard, Harry Belafonte and Charles Zwar); The Pajama Game; Damn Yankees
Sherman Brothers Robert B. Sherman Richard M. Sherman	1951–2000	The Absent-Minded Professor; The Parent Trap; Moon Pilot; Bon Voyage! Big Red; The Legend of Lobo; In Search of the Castaways; Miracle of the White Stallions; Summer Magic; The Sword in the Stone; Miracle of the White Stallions; The Misadventures of Merlin Jones; Mary Poppins; Those Calloways; The Monkey's Uncle; That Darn Cat! Follow Me, Boys! Monkeys, Go Home! The Adventures of Bullwhip Griffin (with George Bruns and Mel Leven); The Gnome-Mobile; The Jungle Book (with Terry Gilkyson); The Happiest Millionaire; The One and Only, Genuine, Original Family Band; Chitty Chitty Bang Bang; The Aristocats (with Terry Gilkyson, Floyd Huddleston and Al Rinker); Victory Canteen; Bedknobs and Broomsticks; Snoopy Come Home; Charlotte's Web; Tom Sawyer; Over Here! Huckleberry Finn; The Slipper and the Rose; The Many Adventures of Winnie the Pooh; The Magic of Lassie; Dawgs; Little Nemo: Adventures in Slumberland; Busker Alley; The Mighty Kong; Winnie the Pooh: Seasons of Giving (with Michael Silversher and Patty Silversher); The Tigger Movie; A Spoonful of Sherman (with Al Sherman and Robert J. Sherman)
Bock and Harnick Jerry Bock (music) Sheldon Harnick (lyrics)	1958–1970	The Body Beautiful; Fiorello! Tenderloin; To Broadway With Love (with Stephen Foster, Dan Emmett, George M. Cohan, Victor Herbert, Henry Blossom, Colin Romoff, Martin Charnin, Jerome Kern, Guy Bolton, P. G. Wodehouse, James F. Hanley, Ballard MacDonald, Joe Goodwin, Cole Porter, Irving Berlin, Richard Rodgers, Oscar Hammerstein II, Kurt Weill, Ogden Nash, Hugh Martin, Ralph Blane, Jule Styne, Sammy Cahn and Harold Rome); She Loves Me; Fiddler on the Roof; The Apple Tree; Baker Street (with Marian Grudeff and Raymond Jessel); The Rothschilds
Maltby and Shire Richard Maltby Jr. (lyrics) David Shire (music)	1958–2026	Cyrano; The Sap of Life; Starting Here, Starting Now; Baby; Closer Than Ever; Big; Take Flight; Waterfall; The Country Wife; About Time
Strouse and Adams Charles Strouse (music) Lee Adams (lyrics)	1959–2002	A Pound in Your Pocket; Bye Bye Birdie; All American; Golden Boy; It's a Bird, It's a Plane, It's Superman; Alice in Wonderland or What's a Nice Kid like You Doing in a Place like This? The Night They Raided Minsky's; Applause; There Was a Crooked Man... I and Albert; A Broadway Musical; Bring Back Birdie; An American Tragedy (with Mark St. Germain); Marty
Bricusse and Newley Leslie Bricusse (lyrics) Anthony Newley (music)	1961–1976	Stop the World – I Want to Get Off; The Roar of the Greasepaint – The Smell of the Crowd; Willy Wonka & the Chocolate Factory; The Good Old Bad Old Days; Peter Pan
Kander and Ebb John Kander (music) Fred Ebb (lyrics)	1965–2010	Flora the Red Menace; Cabaret; Go Fly a Kite; The Happy Time; Zorba; 70, Girls, 70; Funny Lady; Chicago; 2 by 5 New York, New York; The Act; Woman of the Year; The Rink; And The World Goes 'Round; Kiss of the Spider Woman; Steel Pier; Fosse; All About Us; Liza's Back; Curtains; The Scottsboro Boys; The Visit
Lloyd Webber and Rice Andrew Lloyd Webber (music) Tim Rice (lyrics)	1965–1976	The Likes of Us; Joseph and the Amazing Technicolor Dreamcoat; Jesus Christ Superstar; Evita; Cricket; The Wizard of Oz (with Harold Arlen and E. Y. Harburg); Sherlock Holmes and The 12 Days of Christmas
Boublil and Schönberg Alain Boublil (lyrics) Claude-Michel Schönberg (music)	1973–present	La Révolution Française (with Raymond Jeannot and Jean-Max Rivière); Les Misérables (with Herbert Kretzmer and Jean-Marc Natel); Miss Saigon (with Richard Maltby Jr.); Martin Guerre (with Edward Hardy and Stephen Clark); The Pirate Queen (with Richard Maltby Jr. and John Dempsey)
Kunze and Levay Michael Kunze (lyrics) Sylvester Levay (music)	1974–present	Elisabeth; Mozart! Rebecca (with Christopher Hampton); Marie Antoinette; Lady Bess
Ashman and Menken Howard Ashman (lyrics) Alan Menken (music)	1979–1991	Kurt Vonnegut's God Bless You, Mr. Rosewater (with Dennis Green); Little Shop of Horrors; Diamonds (with John Kander, Fred Ebb, David Zippel, Larry Grossman, Ellen Fitzhugh, Cy Coleman, Betty Comden, Adolph Green, Craig Carnelia, Albert Von Tilzer, Jack Norworth, Jonathan Sheffer, Jim Wann, Gerard Alessandrini, Lyn Udall, Karl Kennett and Doug Katsaros); The Little Mermaid; Beauty and the Beast; Aladdin (with Tim Rice)
Stiles and Drewe George Stiles (music) Anthony Drewe (lyrics)	1984–present	Tutankhamun; Just So; Honk! Peter Pan: A Musical Adventure; Mary Poppins (with Richard M. Sherman and Robert B. Sherman); Betty Blue Eyes; Soho Cinders; Three Little Pigs; Goldilocks and the Three Bears; The Three Billy Goats Gruff; Travels with My Aunt; Half a Sixpence (with David Heneker); The Wind in the Willows; Becoming Nancy (with Terry Ronald and Elliot Davis); Identical
Ahrens and Flaherty Lynn Ahrens (lyrics) Stephen Flaherty (music)	1988–present	Lucky Stiff; Once on This Island; My Favorite Year; Ragtime; Anastasia; Buster & Chauncey's Silent Night; Bartok the Magnificent; Seussical; A Man of No Importance; Dessa Rose; Chita Rivera: The Dancer's Life (with Alberto Domínguez, Milton Leeds, James Taylor, Irving Berlin, Lawrence Holofcener, Jerry Bock, Victor Young, Stella Unge, Sheldon Harnick, Cole Porter, Leonard Bernstein, Stephen Sondheim, Charles Strouse, Lee Adams, John Kander, Fred Ebb, Cy Coleman, Dorothy Fields, Ástor Piazzolla, Vincent Youmans, Edward Eliscu and Billy Rose); The Glorious Ones; Rocky the Musical; Little Dancer; Knoxville
Don Black and Christopher Hampton	1993–present	Sunset Boulevard (with Andrew Lloyd Webber and Amy Powers); Dracula, the Musical (with Frank Wildhorn); Stephen Ward the Musical (with Andrew Lloyd Webber)
Kitt and Yorkey Tom Kitt (music) Brian Yorkey (lyrics)	1994–present	Angels at Columbia: Centennial Approaches; Feeling Electric; In Your Eyes; Next to Normal; If/Then; Freaky Friday; The Visitor
Wildhorn and Murphy Frank Wildhorn (music) Jack Murphy (lyrics)	1998–present	The Civil War; Waiting for the Moon; Rudolf (with Nan Knighton); Carmen; The Count of Monte Cristo; Wonderland; Mitsuko; Death Note: The Musical; Mata Hari; The Man Who Laughs
Sklar and Beguelin Matthew Sklar (music) Chad Beguelin (lyrics)	2000–present	The Rhythm Club; The Wedding Singer; Elf; The Prom
Benjamin and O'Keefe Nell Benjamin (lyrics) Laurence O'Keefe (music)	2000–present	The Mice; Sarah, Plain and Tall; Cam Jansen; Legally Blonde; The Sea Beast; Huzzah!
Shaiman and Wittman Marc Shaiman Scott Wittman	2002–present	Hairspray; The Cat in the Hat; Martin Short: Fame Becomes Me; Catch Me If You Can; Charlie and the Chocolate Factory (with Leslie Bricusse and Anthony Newley); Wiener-dog; Mary Poppins Returns; Some Like It Hot; Rogers: The Musical (with Alan Menken, David Zippel, Christopher Lennertz, Jordan Peterson and Alex Karukas); Smash
Pasek and Paul Benj Pasek Justin Paul	2005–present	Edges; James and the Giant Peach; Dogfight; A Christmas Story: The Musical; Dear Evan Hansen; Tom and Jerry: Back to Oz (with Harold Arlen and E. Y. Harburg); Trolls (with Justin Timberlake, Max Martin, Shellback, Savan Kotecha, Oscar Holter, Jesper Mortensen, Justice, Jessie Chaton, Stephen McCarthy, Paul Simon, Lionel Richie, Nile Rodgers, Bernard Edwards, Sean Combs, The Notorious B.I.G., Stevie J, Mase, Ilya Salmanzadeh, Tom Kelly, Billy Steinberg, Al McKay, Allee Willis, Maurice White and Peter Svensson); La La Land (with Justin Hurwitz); The Greatest Showman; Aladdin (with Alan Menken, Howard Ashman and Tim Rice); Lyle, Lyle, Crocodile; Spirited; Snow White (with Frank Churchill, Larry Morey, Jack Feldman and Lizzy McAlpine)
Miller and Tysen Chris Miller (music) Nathan Tysen (lyrics)	2006–present	The Burnt Part Boys; Fugitive Songs; The Mysteries of Harris Burdick; Tuck Everlasting; Dreamland; Revival; Blown Sideways Through Life
Kristen Anderson-Lopez and Robert Lopez	2006–present	Finding Nemo – The Musical; Winnie the Pooh (with Richard M. Sherman, Robert B. Sherman and Zooey Deschanel); Frozen; Up Here; Coco (with Germaine Franco and Adrian Molina); Frozen II
Brunger and Cleary Jake Brunger Pippa Cleary	2008–present	Jet Set Go! The Great British Soap Opera; Red Riding Hood; The Snow Gorilla; The Secret Diary of Adrian Mole Aged 13¾; Prodigy; Treasure Island; Chicken Little; Friends! The Musical Parody; The Great British Bake Off Musical
Lindsay-Abaire and Tesori David Lindsay-Abaire (lyrics) Jeanine Tesori (music)	2008–present	Shrek the Musical (with Mike Himelstein, Eric Darnell and Neil Diamond); Kimberly Akimbo
A. J. Holmes (music) and Darren Criss (lyrics)	2009–2012	A Very Potter Musical; Me and My Dick (with Carlos Valdes); A Very Potter Senior Year (with Clark Baxtresser and Pierce Siebers)
Sankoff and Hein Irene Sankoff David Hein	2009–present	My Mother's Lesbian Jewish Wiccan Wedding; Come from Away
Brad Alexander (music) and Kevin Del Aguila (lyrics)	2009–present	Click Clack Moo; We the People: America Rocks! (with Eli Bolin, Sam Forman, Joe Iconis, Tommy Newman, Adam Overett, Erik Weiner, Mark Weiner, Jordan Allen-Dutton, Douglas Lyons and Ethan Pakchar); Dog Man: The Musical; Cat Kid Comic Club: The Musical
Aronson and Park Will Aronson (music) Hue Park (lyrics)	2012–present	Bungee Jump; Maybe Happy Ending; Il Tenore; Ghost Bakery
Marlow and Moss Toby Marlow Lucy Moss	2017–present	Six; Hot Gay Time Machine (with Zak Ghazi-Torbati); The Monkey King; Why Am I So Single?
Barlow and Bear Abigail Barlow Emily Bear	2021–present	The Unofficial Bridgerton Musical; Mexican Pizza: The Musical; Moana 2 (with Mark Mancina and Opetaia Foaʻi)

== Opera ==
Collaborators	Period	Operas
Verdi and Piave Giuseppe Verdi (music) Francesco Maria Piave (lyrics)	1844–1865	Ernani; I due Foscari; Attila (with Temistocle Solera); Macbeth (with Andrea Maffei); Il corsaro Stiffelio; Rigoletto; La traviata Simon Boccanegra; Aroldo; La forza del destino (with Antonio Ghislanzoni)
Gilbert and Sullivan W. S. Gilbert (lyrics) Arthur Sullivan (music)	1871–1896	Thespis; Trial by Jury; H.M.S. Pinafore; The Sorcerer; The Pirates of Penzance; Iolanthe; Patience; Princess Ida; The Mikado; Ruddigore; The Yeomen of the Guard; The Gondoliers; Utopia, Limited; The Grand Duke
Herbert and Blossom Victor Herbert (music) Henry Blossom (lyrics)	1905–1919	Mlle. Modiste; The Red Mill; The Prima Donna; The Only Girl; The Princess Pat; The Century Girl (with Irving Berlin); Eileen; Miss 1917 (with Jerome Kern, Harry B. Smith, Otto Harbach, Billy Baskette, Benny Davis, C. Francis Reisner, Gustav Kerker, Hugh Morton, George Evans, Ren Shields, John Stromberg, Edgar Smith, Bob Cole, J. Rosamond Johnson, Karl Hoschna, Edward Hutchinson, James O'Dea, Henry I. Marshall, Stanley Murphy, Joseph McCarthy, Joseph Schenck, Gus Van, Harry Tierney, Stanley Murphy); The Velvet Lady
Lee Holdridge (music) and Richard Sparks (lyrics)	1995–2013	Journey to Cordoba; The Secret of NIMH 2: Timmy to the Rescue; The Magic Dream; Concierto Para Mendez; Tanis in America; Dulce Rosa
John Musto (music) and Mark Campbell (lyrics)	2004–2011	Volpone; Later the Same Evening; Bastianello; The Inspector

== Duos ==
- Richard Adler and Jerry Ross
- Benny Andersson and Björn Ulvaeus
- Jimmy Jam and Terry Lewis
- Kristen Anderson-Lopez and Robert Lopez
- Will Aronson and Hue Park
- Lynn Ahrens and Stephen Flaherty
- Harold Arlen and Johnny Mercer
- Brad Alexander and Kevin Del Aguila
- Nick Ashford and Valerie Simpson
- Howard Ashman and Alan Menken
- Burt Bacharach and Hal David
- Abigail Barlow and Emily Bear
- Nell Benjamin and Laurence O'Keefe
- Jake Brunger and Pippa Cleary
- Alan and Marilyn Bergman
- Toby Marlow and Lucy Moss
- Jack Black and Kyle Gass
- Don Black and Christopher Hampton
- Jerry Bock and Sheldon Harnick
- Alain Boublil and Claude-Michel Schönberg
- Leslie Bricusse and Anthony Newley
- Bono and The Edge
- Mike Chapman and Nicky Chinn
- Jay Chou and Vincent Fang
- Frank Churchill and Larry Morey
- Cy Coleman and Carolyn Leigh
- Carol Connors and Ayn Robbins
- Roger Cook and Roger Greenaway
- Betty Comden and Adolph Green
- Dwiki Dharmawan and Ags. Arya Dipayana
- Bernard Edwards and Nile Rodgers
- Donald Fagen and Walter Becker
- Billie Eilish and Finneas O'Connell
- Michael Flanders and Donald Swann
- John Flansburgh and John Linnell
- Andrew Farriss and Michael Hutchence
- David Foster and Linda Thompson
- Charles Fox and Norman Gimbel
- Arthur Freed and Nacio Herb Brown
- Jerry Garcia and Robert Hunter
- Ira and George Gershwin
- W. S. Gilbert and Arthur Sullivan
- Gerry Goffin and Carole King
- Mack Gordon and Harry Revel
- Ellie Greenwich and Jeff Barry
- Marian Grudeff and Raymond Jessel
- Marvin Hamlisch and Carole Bayer Sager
- Dan Hartman and Charlie Midnight
- Isaac Hayes and David Porter
- Don Henley and Glenn Frey
- Victor Herbert and Henry Blossom
- Lee Holdridge and Richard Sparks
- A. J. Holmes and Darren Criss
- James Horner and Will Jennings
- Mick Jagger and Keith Richards
- Antônio Carlos Jobim and Vinicius de Moraes
- Elton John and Bernie Taupin
- John Kander and Fred Ebb
- Jerome Kern and Oscar Hammerstein II
- Michael Kunze and Sylvester Levay
- Tom Kitt and Brian Yorkey
- Jerry Leiber and Mike Stoller
- John Lennon and Paul McCartney
- Alan Jay Lerner and Frederick Loewe
- David Lindsay-Abaire and Jeanine Tesori
- Jay Livingston and Ray Evans
- Andrew Lloyd Webber and Tim Rice
- Barry Mann and Cynthia Weil
- Jimmy McHugh and Harold Adamson
- Richard Maltby Jr. and David Shire
- Steve Marriott and Ronnie Lane
- Barry Manilow and Bruce Sussman
- Jimmy McHugh and Dorothy Fields
- Chris Miller and Nathan Tysen
- Steven Morrissey and Johnny Marr
- John Musto and Mark Campbell
- Michele Brourman and Amanda McBroom
- Jimmy Page and Robert Plant
- Trey Parker and Matt Stone
- Benj Pasek and Justin Paul
- A. R. Rahman and Gulzar
- Doc Pomus and Mort Shuman
- Tony Renis and Alberto Testa
- Leo Robin and Ralph Rainger
- Richard Rodgers and Oscar Hammerstein II
- Richard Rodgers and Lorenz Hart
- Irene Sankoff and David Hein
- Marc Shaiman and Scott Wittman
- Robert B. Sherman and Richard M. Sherman
- Alan Silvestri and Glen Ballard
- Michael Silversher and Patty Silversher
- Matthew Sklar and Chad Beguelin
- Charles Strouse and Lee Adams
- Joe Strummer and Mick Jones
- Neil Tennant and Chris Lowe
- Steven Tyler and Joe Perry
- Jimmy Van Heusen and Sammy Cahn
- Harry Warren and Al Dubin
- Diane Warren and James Newton Howard
- Gene Ween and Dean Ween
- Norman Whitfield and Barrett Strong
- Frank Wildhorn and Jack Murphy
- Brian Wilson and Mike Love
- Chris Difford and Glenn Tilbrook
- Scott Stapp and Mark Tremonti
- James Hetfield and Lars Ulrich
- Jon Bon Jovi and Richie Sambora
- Brett Gurewitz and Greg Graffin
- Robbie Williams and Guy Chambers
- Harry Vanda and George Young
- Giuseppe Verdi and Francesco Maria Piave
- Jon Anderson and Chris Squire
- Danny O'Donoghue and Mark Sheehan
- Beyoncé and Jay-Z
- Kip Winger and Reb Beach
- Jemaine Clement and Bret McKenzie
- Matthew and Eleanor Friedberger

== Trios ==
- Barry, Robin and Maurice Gibb
- Brian Holland, Lamont Dozier and Eddie Holland, Jr.
- Mike Stock, Matt Aitken and Peter Waterman
- James Bourne, Charlie Simpson and Matt Willis
- Andy Samberg, Jorma Taccone and Akiva Schaffer

== Quartets ==
- Murray Cook, Jeff Fatt, Anthony Field and Greg Page (from/for The Wiggles)
