= Pippa Cleary =

English musical theatre composer and lyricist

Pippa Cleary is an English musical theatre composer and lyricist. She is best known for her collaborations with Jake Brunger and Rob Madge. She is the first female composer with three West End shows.

== Personal life ==
Cleary was born in June 1986 and raised in London. She is visually impaired, having been born with Toxoplasmosis. She has spoken about overcoming the challenges this has presented for her career. Cleary is an alumna of St Paul's Girls' School and of Bristol University. She is the founder and owner of a children's music and drama business called Pippa's Poppets, for which she writes songs.

== Musicals ==
=== Collaborations with Jake Brunger ===
She met Brunger at Bristol University as fellow students. Cleary's first musical, written with Jake Brunger, Jet Set Go! ran at the 2008 Edinburgh Fringe Festival at George Square Theatre. Following the Festival it played a short sell-out season at Theatre503 in London. A new production in April 2009 ran at Jermyn Street Theatre with a cast including Mark Evans and Tim Driesen.

Their second musical The Great British Soap Opera ran at the 2009 Edinburgh Fringe Festival – again at George Square Theatre – and subsequently transferred for a run at Jermyn Street Theatre in September 2009. The cast included Philippa Buxton and Leon Kay featuring the voice of Lynda Bellingham.

In 2010, Brunger and Cleary were commissioned to write the stage adaptation of Enid Blyton's Malory Towers series, which received a workshop at St Paul's Girls' School in Hammersmith, directed by Thea Sharrock, and in August 2011 they wrote a new musical for Youth Music Theatre UK (YMT) called The Lost and Found Office, which was directed by Gemma Farlie.

In March 2012 they wrote a new song for A Song Cycle for Soho at Soho Theatre, starring Claire Moore, Michael Cantwell, Niamh Perry and James Gillan. It was released on CD in May 2012 by SimG Records.

In November 2013, their new stage adaptation of Little Red Riding Hood opened at Singapore Repertory Theatre directed by Kate Golledge and choreographed by Ashley Nottingham, where it ran for 6 weeks. It is licensed worldwide by Rodgers and Hammerstein Theatricals, with the Spanish language premiere taking place in Mexico City in October 2015.

In December 2013, The Snow Gorilla – featuring the voice of Brian Blessed – opened for a five-week run at the Rose Theatre, Kingston, for which they wrote music and lyrics.

Their new stage musical adaptation of Sue Townsend's The Secret Diary of Adrian Mole, Aged 13¾ opened at Leicester's Curve Theatre in March 2015. Their original new musical Prodigy, commissioned by National Youth Music Theatre, ran at the St James Theatre in August 2015. The original cast recording of Prodigy was released in July 2016, debuting at number 3 on the iTunes Soundtrack album chart.

Their new stage musical adaptation of Robert Louis Stevenson's Treasure Island opened at Singapore Repertory Theatre on 30 October 2015 for a six-week run, and the UK premiere of Red Riding Hood ran at the Pleasance Theatre in December 2015 before touring to Bahrain, Doha and opening at the 2016 Edinburgh Fringe Festival. A reworked version of the show was announced at Bristol Old Vic Theatre in December 2025. The show starred comedienne Jayde Adams in her first professional stage role. The show opened to broadly positive reviews with Cleary's songs in particular being described as "nothing short of a hoot" and the show as a whole being referred to as one which "restores the glow" of the Bristol Old Vic Christmas show. The show was nominated for the 2026 UK Theatre Awards for Best Show for Children & Young People.

The North American premiere of Red Riding Hood opened at Casa Manana in Texas, USA, in March 2017.

In July 2017, The Secret Diary of Adrian Mole, Aged 13¾ opened in a new production at the Menier Chocolate Factory in London, directed by Luke Sheppard. The production was subsequently nominated for the 2017 Evening Standard Award for Best Musical.

Their new adaptation of Chicken Little opened at Singapore Repertory Theatre on 25 October 2017 for a six-week run after a brief try-out at London's The Other Palace in August 2017. The show had another run at the Singapore Repertory Theatre in 2026.

Brunger and Cleary made their cabaret debut at Live at Zedel in September 2018 with a guest cast featuring Olivier Award nominee Rosemary Ashe.

In June 2019, The Secret Diary of Adrian Mole, Aged 13¾ opened at the Ambassadors Theatre in London's West End, directed once again by Luke Sheppard, for a 15-week summer season.

In summer 2022, their new musical The Great British Bake Off Musical based on the hit TV series The Great British Bake Off opened at the Everyman Theatre, Cheltenham before transferring in to the Noël Coward Theatre in London's West End. The musical starred Claire Moore, Charlotte Wakefield, John Owen-Jones and Haydn Gwynne and was directed by Rachel Kavanaugh.

=== Work with Rob Madge ===
Cleary was approached to collaborate with Rob Madge on My Son's a Queer (But What Can You Do?), a one-person biographical play. The show revolves around Madge's childhood videos, and the shows they used to put on in their living room for their parents. Cleary composed the music for the show as well as working on lyrics with Rob.

The show made its world premiere at the Turbine Theatre on 17 June 2021 for a limited run until 3 July with Madge playing themself. The production was directed by Luke Sheppard (who worked with Cleary on various projects including The Secret Diary of Adrian Mole, Aged 13¾) and produced by Paul Taylor Mills. The show won the 2022 WhatsOnStage Award for Best Off-West End. The playtext was published by Nick Hern Books.

Following its success at the Turbine, the show ran at the Edinburgh Fringe Festival at the Underbelly from 4 to 29 August with a run at Norwich Playhouse on 2 and 3 September 2021.

During the Edinburgh run, it was announced that the show would transfer to the Garrick Theatre in London's West End from 21 October to 6 November 2022. The show later played another West End season at the Ambassadors Theatre from 25 January to 1 April 2023. The West End runs were nominated for the 2023 Laurence Olivier Award for Best Entertainment or Comedy Play. Madge won the Theatre Award at the 2023 Virgin Atlantic Attitude Awards and was a joint winner of the Best Creative West End Debut Award at The Stage Debut Awards in 2023 (as writer).

It was announced following that the show would transfer to Broadway at the Lyceum Theatre from February 27, 2024, for a 16-week limited engagement, however on February 8 it was announced that the run would be postponed to the 2024–25 season with dates and a new theatre to be announced. In 2025 it was announced that the show would have a limited run at New York City Center in June 2025. It was described as an "an explosion of pure, homegrown joy." by New York Theatre Guide.

Following the postponement of the Broadway run, the show toured the UK beginning at the Curve, Leicester from 8 to 10 July 2024 before heading to Birmingham Hippodrome (11 to 13 July), Belgrade Theatre, Coventry (15 to 17 July), Liverpool Playhouse (18 to 20 July), Derby Theatre (22 to 24 July), McEwan Hall, Edinburgh (1 to 16 August) and HOME, Manchester (19 to 25 August).

Cleary performed in Rob Madge's Regards to Broadway, a play performed and written by Madge in response to the postponement of the Broadway run of My Son's a Queer (But What Can You Do?). Cleary wrote a song with Madge, "All in Good Time", for the show. It was performed for one night on 26 May 2024 at the Garrick Theatre, but due to popular demand a matinee performance was added. It was Cleary's first performance on a West End stage.

My Son's a Queer (But What Can You Do?) had a final, 3 week run in 2026 from 16th September to 3rd October at the Apollo Theatre

In September 2025 it was announced that Cleary and Madge had developed a new show, Bank of Dave: The Musical, based on Bank of Dave (film) and the life of Dave Fishwick which would run at The Lowry and Curve (theatre) in May 2026 The show received mixed to positive reviews but praise was given to Cleary's songs in particular with The Guardian stating "Pippa Cleary’s songs are bright and engaging, drawing on gospel, soul, hip-hop and Broadway golden age." WhatsOnStage.com stated "The score barrels along with infectious enthusiasm, blending pub-singalong energy with heartfelt ballads. There are songs that thump like a Friday night in a working men’s club and quieter moments that sneak up unexpectedly, landing with surprising emotional precision. They breeze through the narrative naturally, ensuring the pacing is always on point and emotionally resonant." in a 4 star review.

=== Other work ===
Cleary has collaborated on a number of other projects. One such project is Alice Down the Rabbit Hole a musical with a modern take on the book Alice's Adventures in Wonderland with Book and Lyrics written by P Burton-Morgan.

She also worked with Philip LaZebnik on the theatrical musical "Snow White and Me" with Philip writing book with Ronald Kruschwak and Cleary writing Music and Lyrics. This premiered in Brno, Czech Republic at Meska Divadlo in 2022 and has had subsequent performances in Germany and at Stephens College in Columbia, Missouri. An original cast recording was released in 2026 featuring performances from Stephens College students as well as long time collaborator Rob Madge. A 2026 production was also staged at Freilichtspiele Tecklenburg receiving positive reviews.

Cleary wrote the music and lyrics to the first original opening number of the Laurence Olivier Awards in 2023, performed by Hannah Waddingham.

Cleary also wrote the music for the song Obey from Prince Andrew: The Musical with Munya Chawawa writing lyrics.

== Awards ==
Brunger and Cleary were nominated for the 2010 Stiles and Drewe Prize for Best Song, which was judged at a ceremony at the Queen's Theatre on Shaftesbury Avenue. Before that, Cleary was nominated for the Notes for the Stage competition, and she was a finalist for the 2011 Tim Williams Award. She won the 2009 Music Theatre Matters Award in recognition of her composition for both Jet Set Go! and The Great British Soap Opera. Later in January 2013, Cleary won the Arts Foundation Composition for Musical Theatre Fellowship. Brunger and Cleary were also nominated for the 2013 Stiles and Drewe Prize.

In September 2015, their adaptation of The Secret Diary of Adrian Mole, Aged 13¾ was nominated for Best Show for Children and Young People at Theatre Awards UK.

In March 2016, their adaptation of Treasure Island was nominated for Best Show for the Young at the Straits Times' Singapore Life Theatre Awards. and Chicken Little was also nominated for this award in March 2018.

In December 2017, the Menier Chocolate Factory production of The Secret Diary of Adrian Mole, Aged 13¾ was nominated for the 2017 Evening Standard Award for Best Musical against Follies, School of Rock and Bat Out Of Hell.

In February 2022 My Son's a Queer (But what can you do?) won Best Off West End Production at the 2022 WhatsOnStage Awards for its run at the Turbine Theatre.

In August 2022, Cleary won the Outstanding Visually Impaired Creative at the first Neurodiverse Review Awards For My Son's A Queer, Edinburgh Festival.

At the 2023 Laurence Olivier Awards, My Son's a Queer (But what can you do?) was nominated for Best Entertainment or Comedy Play.

At the 2026 UK Theatre Awards Cleary and Brunger's production of Treasure Island, performed at Bristol Old Vic Theatre, was nominated for Best Show for Children & Young People.

== Critical acclaim ==
Jet Set Go! received rave reviews both in Edinburgh and London. Dominic Cavendish in The Daily Telegraph described it as "a delightful, inventive and witty new musical" and Jay Richardson in The Scotsman wrote that "Jet Set Go! is one of those rare, unexpected delights". The 2009 production at Jermyn Street Theatre received a Time Out Critics' Choice.

The Great British Soap Opera was likewise well received by critics. Sally Stott in The Scotsman wrote 'there's a sophisticated structure underpinning the story in which "real" life and TV fiction run as parallels... it's all great fun, surprisingly clever and just like a real soap you'll find yourself getting drawn in despite yourself'. In London, Nina Caplan in Time Out described the musical as "more welcome than any profound examination of these putrid times"

The Secret Diary of Adrian Mole, Aged 13¾ at Leicester's Curve Theatre received 4 stars from The Daily Telegraph, The Times and The Guardian. Lyn Gardner in The Guardian wrote that Mole was "a home-grown hit for the Curve... a show constantly paying neat homage to previous British musicals and the traditions of the TV sitcom, and yet always staying distinctive and true to its source material... a quaint, unassuming little charmer." Dominic Cavendish in The Telegraph wrote that "this all-singing, all-dancing Mole comes up trumps; in fact, it's so good it could burrow its way to the West End... the evening does that rare thing: it makes you laugh, tugs at your heart-strings and honours the spirit of the original while being playfully inventive... this fresh, funny, stirring spin on a Thatcher-era classic may be around for a long time to come." Dominic Maxwell in The Times wrote "it's no small achievement to make this first musical version such a lively, evocative pleasure... amusing and affecting enough to leave you glowing... a thoroughly charming evening: faithful to the book but with a tenderness of its own.

Red Riding Hood at the Pleasance Theatre in London received 4 stars from The Stage newspaper. Critic Paul Vale wrote: "Red Riding Hood is a thoughtful, and frankly exciting, adaptation of the popular children's story. It's not simply the story that's exciting, although Brunger's book opens up the thin narrative to create a host of sharp ideas and characters. What is exciting is that Red Riding Hood is a perfectly formed, well-rounded piece of musical theatre for young people. It doesn't make any concessions to the age of its intended audience, but offers a commendable introduction to the authors."

The 2017 London production of The Secret Diary of Adrian Mole, Aged 13¾ at the Menier Chocolate Factory received 5 stars from The Evening Standard, The Independent and Whatsonstage.com, with 4 star reviews from The Daily Telegraph, The Times and The Guardian. Michael Billington in The Guardian described it as "A fresh and funny show from the young songwriting team of Jake Brunger (book and lyrics) and Pippa Cleary (music and lyrics). They clearly have the potential to inject new life into the anaemic British musical", with Fiona Mountford in The Evening Standard calling it "a perfectly realised new British musical". Ben Brantley also positively reviewed the musical in The New York Times, describing it as "a delightful new musical".

My Son's a Queer (But what can you do?) has received overwhelming critical acclaim received 5 stars from City A.M., Time Out (magazine), Gay Times and The Stage, with 4 star reviews from The Daily Telegraph, WhatsOnStage.com, Evening Standard and The Guardian. Time Out stated "You'll be hard-pressed to find a more joyous, life-affirming show in the West End".

Treasure Island received broadly excellent reviews for its run at Bristol Old Vic Theatre. In a 4 Star review in the Guardian, the show was described as leaving you with a "warm, seasonal glow" and saying that this "swashbuckling musical is shipshape and Bristol fashion". In another 4 star review from WhatsonStage the show was described as a "witty, buoyant work that strengthens their promise and proves that family theatre can be clever without losing its heart" while the songs were described as "genuine earworms". The Telegraph also gave the show 4 stars describing it as "destination theatre at its heartiest."
