= Damian Humbley =

Australian singer and actor (born 1979)

Damian Humbley (born 13 February 1979) is an Australian singer and actor. Born in Queensland, he trained at the Western Australian Academy of Performing Arts. He is best known for his work on the stage in the UK, notable credits including acclaimed productions of Stephen Sondheim musicals such as Company at the Sheffield Crucible and Merrily We Roll Along at the Menier Chocolate Factory.

In 2013 he played the role of Charley Kringas in the Harold Pinter Theatre's filmed production of Merrily We Roll Along.

== Musical theatre ==
Humbley played the role of Perchik in the 2007 London revival of Fiddler on the Roof running for a year from 2007 to 2008 at the Savoy Theatre.

From 2022 to 2023, he played Ben in The Great British Bake Off Musical in London's West End.

== Theatre credits ==
Year	Title	Role	Theatre
2004	The Woman in White	Walter Hartwright	Palace Theatre
2006	The Last Five Years	Jamie	Menier Chocolate Factory
2007	Fiddler on the Roof	Perchik	Savoy Theatre
2009	Little Shop of Horrors	Seymour	UK Tour
2011	Lend Me a Tenor	Max Garber	Gielgud Theatre
2011	Company	Harry	Crucible Theatre
2012	Merrily We Roll Along	Charley Kringas	Menier Chocolate Factory
2013	Merrily We Roll Along	Charley Kringas	Harold Pinter Theatre
2014	Forbidden Broadway	various	Vaudeville Theatre
2017	Merrily We Roll Along	Charley Kringas	Huntington Theatre Company
2020	A Little Night Music	Fredrik Egerman	Holland Park
2022	The Great British Bake Off Musical	Ben	Everyman Theatre, Cheltenham
2023	The Great British Bake Off Musical	Ben	Noel Coward Theatre
2023	Stephen Sondheim's Old Friends	various	Gielgud Theatre
