= Jake Brunger and Pippa Cleary =

Duo of authors

Jake Brunger and Pippa Cleary are a London-based musical theatre writing partnership. They met at Bristol University, where they were studying Drama and Music respectively.

== Musicals ==
Their first musical Jet Set Go! ran at the 2008 Edinburgh Fringe Festival at George Square Theatre. Following the Festival it played a short sell-out season at Theatre503 in London. A new production in April 2009 ran at Jermyn Street Theatre with a cast including Mark Evans and Tim Driesen. Jet Set Go! is published and licensed by Music Theatre International. The amateur premiere took place at Cambridge University in February 2011, a production which subsequently opened at the Edinburgh Fringe Festival in August 2011.

Their second musical The Great British Soap Opera ran at the 2009 Edinburgh Fringe Festival – again at George Square Theatre – and subsequently transferred for a run at Jermyn Street Theatre in September 2009. The cast included Philippa Buxton and Leon Kay featuring the voice of Lynda Bellingham.

In 2010, Brunger and Cleary were commissioned to write the stage adaptation of Enid Blyton's Malory Towers series, which received a workshop at St Paul's Girls' School in Hammersmith, directed by Thea Sharrock, and in August 2011 they wrote a new musical for Youth Music Theatre UK (YMT) called The Lost and Found Office, which was directed by Gemma Farlie.

In March 2012 they wrote a new song for A Song Cycle for Soho at Soho Theatre, starring Claire Moore, Michael Cantwell, Niamh Perry and James Gillan. It was released on CD in May 2012 by SimG Records.

In November 2013, their new stage adaptation of Little Red Riding Hood opened at Singapore Repertory Theatre directed by Kate Golledge and choreographed by Ashley Nottingham, where it ran for 6 weeks. It is licensed worldwide by Rodgers and Hammerstein Theatricals, with the Spanish language premiere taking place in Mexico City in October 2015.

In December 2013, The Snow Gorilla – featuring the voice of Brian Blessed – opened for a five-week run at the Rose Theatre, Kingston, for which they wrote music and lyrics.

Their new stage musical adaptation of Sue Townsend's The Secret Diary of Adrian Mole, Aged 13¾ opened at Leicester's Curve Theatre in March 2015. Their original new musical Prodigy, commissioned by National Youth Music Theatre, ran at the St James Theatre in August 2015. The original cast recording of Prodigy was released in July 2016, debuting at number 3 on the iTunes Soundtrack album chart.

Their new stage musical adaptation of Robert Louis Stevenson's Treasure Island opened at Singapore Repertory Theatre on 30 October 2015 for a six-week run, and the UK premiere of Red Riding Hood ran at the Pleasance Theatre in December 2015 before touring to Bahrain, Doha and opening at the 2016 Edinburgh Fringe Festival.

The North American premiere of Red Riding Hood opened at Casa Manana in Texas, USA, in March 2017.

In July 2017, The Secret Diary of Adrian Mole, Aged 13¾ opened in a new production at the Menier Chocolate Factory in London, directed by Luke Sheppard. The production was subsequently nominated for the 2017 Evening Standard Award for Best Musical.

Their new adaptation of Chicken Little opened at Singapore Repertory Theatre on 25 October 2017 for a six-week run after a brief try-out at London's The Other Palace in August 2017.

Jake and Pippa made their cabaret debut at Live at Zedel in September 2018 with a guest cast featuring Olivier Award nominee Rosemary Ashe.

In June 2019, The Secret Diary of Adrian Mole, Aged 13¾ opened at the Ambassadors Theatre in London's West End, directed once again by Luke Sheppard, for a 15-week summer season.

In summer 2022, their new musical The Great British Bake Off Musical based on the hit TV series The Great British Bake Off opened at the Everyman Theatre, Cheltenham before transferring in to the Noël Coward Theatre in London's West End.

== Awards ==
Brunger and Cleary were nominated for the 2010 Stiles and Drewe Prize for Best Song, which was judged at a ceremony at the Queen's Theatre on Shaftesbury Avenue. Prior to that, Cleary was nominated for the Notes for the Stage competition, and was also a finalist for the 2011 Tim Williams Award. She won the 2009 Music Theatre Matters Award in recognition of her composition for both Jet Set Go! and The Great British Soap Opera. In January 2013 Cleary won the Arts Foundation Composition for Musical Theatre Fellowship. They were also nominated for the 2013 Stiles and Drewe Prize.

In September 2015, their adaptation of The Secret Diary of Adrian Mole, Aged 13¾ was nominated for Best Show for Children and Young People at Theatre Awards UK.

In March 2016, their adaptation of Treasure Island was nominated for Best Show for the Young at the Straits Times' Singapore Life Theatre Awards. with Chicken Little nominated for the same award in March 2018.

In December 2017, the Menier Chocolate Factory production of The Secret Diary of Adrian Mole, Aged 13¾ was nominated for the 2017 Evening Standard Award for Best Musical against Follies, School of Rock and Bat Out Of Hell.

== Critical acclaim ==
Jet Set Go! received rave reviews both in Edinburgh and London. Dominic Cavendish in The Daily Telegraph described it as "a delightful, inventive and witty new musical" and Jay Richardson in The Scotsman wrote that "Jet Set Go! is one of those rare, unexpected delights". The 2009 production at Jermyn Street Theatre received a Time Out Critics' Choice.

The Great British Soap Opera was likewise well received by critics. Sally Stott in The Scotsman wrote 'there's a sophisticated structure underpinning the story in which "real" life and TV fiction run as parallels... it's all great fun, surprisingly clever and just like a real soap you'll find yourself getting drawn in despite yourself'. In London, Nina Caplan in Time Out described the musical as "more welcome than any profound examination of these putrid times"

The Secret Diary of Adrian Mole, Aged 13¾ at Leicester's Curve Theatre received 4 stars from The Daily Telegraph, The Times and The Guardian. Lyn Gardner in The Guardian wrote that Mole was "a home-grown hit for the Curve... a show constantly paying neat homage to previous British musicals and the traditions of the TV sitcom, and yet always staying distinctive and true to its source material... a quaint, unassuming little charmer." Dominic Cavendish in The Telegraph wrote that "this all-singing, all-dancing Mole comes up trumps; in fact, it's so good it could burrow its way to the West End... the evening does that rare thing: it makes you laugh, tugs at your heart-strings and honours the spirit of the original while being playfully inventive... this fresh, funny, stirring spin on a Thatcher-era classic may be around for a long time to come." Dominic Maxwell in The Times wrote "it's no small achievement to make this first musical version such a lively, evocative pleasure... amusing and affecting enough to leave you glowing... a thoroughly charming evening: faithful to the book but with a tenderness of its own."

Red Riding Hood at the Pleasance Theatre in London received 4 stars from The Stage newspaper. Critic Paul Vale wrote: "Red Riding Hood is a thoughtful, and frankly exciting, adaptation of the popular children's story. It's not simply the story that's exciting, although Brunger's book opens up the thin narrative to create a host of sharp ideas and characters. What is exciting is that Red Riding Hood is a perfectly formed, well-rounded piece of musical theatre for young people. It doesn't make any concessions to the age of its intended audience, but offers a commendable introduction to the authors."

The 2017 London production of The Secret Diary of Adrian Mole, Aged 13¾ at the Menier Chocolate Factory received 5 stars from The Evening Standard, The Independent and Whatsonstage.com, with 4 star reviews from The Daily Telegraph, The Times and The Guardian. Michael Billington in The Guardian described it as "A fresh and funny show from the young songwriting team of Jake Brunger (book and lyrics) and Pippa Cleary (music and lyrics). They clearly have the potential to inject new life into the anaemic British musical", with Fiona Mountford in The Evening Standard calling it "a perfectly realised new British musical". Ben Brantley also positively reviewed the musical in The New York Times, describing it as "a delightful new musical".
