= The Great British Bake Off Musical =

Musical by Jake Brunger and Pippa Cleary

- Official artwork for West End production
- Music: Pippa Cleary
- Lyrics: Jake Brunger; Pippa Cleary
- Book: Jake Brunger
- Basis: The Great British Bake Off
- Premiere: 22 July 2022: Everyman Theatre, Cheltenham
- Productions: 2022 Cheltenham; 2023 West End

The Great British Bake Off Musical is a musical with book and lyrics by Jake Brunger and music and lyrics by Pippa Cleary, based on the British television baking competition of the same name.

== Production history ==
=== World premiere: Cheltenham (2022) ===
The musical had its world premiere at the Everyman Theatre in Cheltenham on 23 July running until 6 August 2022. The production was directed by Rachel Kavanaugh, designed by Alice Power, produced by Mark Goucher, executive produced by Richard McKerrow in association with Love Productions. On 1 April 2022, casting was announced including John Owen-Jones and Rosemary Ashe.

=== West End (2023) ===
On the 18th of October 2022, it was announced that the production would transfer to London's West End the following year, running from the 25 February for a 12 week limited run at the Noël Coward Theatre, featuring some members of the original Cheltenham cast reprising their roles. Full casting was announced on 1 December 2022. The Original London Cast Recording was released on 28 April 2023.

== Musical numbers ==
Act I

- "Prologue" – Company
- "The Bake Off Tent" – Jim, Kim & The Bakers
- "The Arrival Of The Judges" - Phil & Pam, Jim & Kim
- "Obviously" – Izzy & The Bakers
- "Somewhere In The Dough" – Gemma
- "Slap It Like That" – Phil & Company
- "Bring on the Scone" – Jim, Kim, Pam & Phil
- "Grow" – Francesca
- "The Handshake Song" – The Bakers
- "My Dad" – Lily & Ben
- "All the Way" – Company

Act II

- "Keep On Keeping On" – Pam and Company
- "The Perfect Petit Fours" – Gemma & Ben
- "Obviously (Reprise) - Izzy
- "Don't Send Me Home" – Company
- "I'd Never Be Me Without You" – Phil & Pam
- "The Semi-Final" – Semi-finalists, Jim, Kim, Pam & Phil
- "Babs' Lament" - Babs
- "Rise" - Gemma
- "Finale " - Company

== Cast and characters ==
Character	Cheltenham	West End
Character	2022	2023
Gemma	Charlotte Wakefield	Charlotte Wakefield
Ben	Damian Humbley	Damian Humbley
Izzy	Simbi Akande	Grace Mouat
Hassan	Aharon Rayner	Aharon Rayner
Babs	Claire Moore	Claire Moore
Francesca	Catriana Sandison	Catriana Sandison
Russell	Michael Cahill	Michael Cahill
Dezza	Jay Saighal	Jay Saighal
Kim	Jaye Jacobs	Zoe Birkett
Jim	Scott Paige	Scott Paige
Pam	Rosemary Ashe	Haydn Gwynne
Phil	John Owen-Jones	John Owen-Jones
Lily	Ariella Elkins-Green; Tessy Hawksfield; Elizabeth McPherson	Aanya Shah; Amelie Rouse; Maisy Mein
Understudies	David Haydn; Louis Gaudencio; Gabriella Stylianou; Annette Yeo	Jamil Abbasi; Louis Gaudencio; Stuart Hickey; Gabriella Stylianou; Georgie Westall; Annette Yeo

== Critical reception ==
The production received mixed to positive reviews from both critics and audiences.
