= Mark Evans (actor) =

Welsh actor (born 1985)

- Born: Mark Henry Evans; 2 January 1985 (age 41); St Asaph, Denbighshire, Wales
- Occupations: Actor; singer; dancer
- Years active: 2002–present
- Website: www.markevansonline.co.uk

Mark Henry Evans (born 2 January 1985) is a Welsh musical theatre actor, singer and dancer, known for numerous Welsh and English-language productions. His various theatre credits include Wicked, Ghost the Musical, and Waitress. He starred as Elder Price in an 18-month (Dec 2012 – June 2014) engagement in the North American tour of The Book of Mormon.

== Personal life ==
Evans was born in St Asaph, North Wales and raised on a farm in Llanrhaeadr in the county of Denbighshire. He is married to fellow actor Justin Mortelliti.

== Career ==
Beginning performances on 16 July 2007, he joined the ensemble of the acclaimed London West End production of Wicked and served as the second understudy for Fiyero Tigelaar. He departed the cast on 7 June 2008, only to return over three and a half years later, this time, in the lead role of Fiyero. He starred alongside Rachel Tucker and Louise Dearman from 7 February through 10 December 2011, when he ended his run in the musical.

On 13 January 2012, took over the role of Sam Wheat in the London production of Ghost the Musical and starred alongside Siobhan Dillon until the musical closed on 6 October 2012. During his time in the show, he and Dillon released a single cover version of "Unchained Melody".

Some of Mark's theatre other credits included the UK national tours of High School Musical (Troy Bolton), The Rocky Horror Show (Brad) and Oklahoma! (Curly).

He appeared on the US national tour of The Book of Mormon in the lead role of Elder Price. Evans began performances on 28 December 2012, in San Francisco contracted for a six-month run, subsequently twice extended to summer 2014, after which he relocated to New York.

Evans appeared on Your Country Needs You with Andrew Lloyd Webber. Evans reached the final in this BBC television competition to determine the UK's competitor in the 2009 Eurovision Song Contest – he finished in third place. He has become a regular on S4C, appeared frequently as a presenter on whatsoninthetheatre.com and developed on Welsh-language programs such as "Dechrau Canu Dechrau Canmol", "Wedi 7", "The Eisteddfod Annual Concert", "The Sian Cothi Show", "Noson Lawen" and "The Big Welsh Talent Concert". His other television and film credits include his own special broadcasting produced by Boomerang Productions, "Noson yng Nghwmni Mark Evans", on S4C in March 2012. He played Brett in "Lake Placid 3" (2010) and also starred as Chad in Grain Media's "Dead Hungry". His venture on S4C, "Marcaroni", a children's program in which he stars in title role was well received by the public. Evans recorded a pilot for his own Radio programme for "BBC Radio Cymru".

In October 2011, he released a bi-lingual album on contemporary Welsh label, Sain Records, and he re-released an English deluxe edition in 2012.

In 2016, he performed in a production of "Finian's Rainbow" at the Irish Repertory Theatre as the character, Og.

In 2017, he performed in Paper Mill Playhouse's production of Mary Poppins, playing Bert.

The West End in Wales scheme is an initiative created by Evans in August 2006. The program offers children in North Wales the chance to work alongside Evans and current West End professionals in a week-long musical theatre summer school.

== Professional theatre credits ==
Start date	End date	Production	Role(s)	Venue(s)
December 2003	January 2004	Aladdin	Dancer	Milton Keynes Theatre
December 2004	January 2005	Aladdin	Dancer, Emperor u/s	New Wimbledon Theatre
September 2005	–	Seven Brides for Seven Brothers	Brother Caleb	Dartford
November 2005	–	Seven Brides for Seven Brothers	Brother Caleb	Manchester
December 2005	January 2006	Dick Whittington	Dick Whittington	The Swan Theatre
January 2006	–	Seven Brides for Seven Brothers	Brother Caleb	Nottingham
July 2006	–	Seven Brides for Seven Brothers	Brother Caleb	Malvern
October 2006	July 2007	Spamalot	Ensemble	Palace Theatre
16 July 2007	7 June 2008	Wicked	Ensemble Fiyero Tigelaar (u/s)	Apollo Victoria Theatre
June 2008	August 2008	High School Musical	Troy Bolton	Hammersmith Apollo
December 2008	January 2009	Cinderella	Prince Charming	Churchill Theatre
April 2009	May 2009	Jet Set Go!	Richard	Jermyn Street Theatre
December 2009	January 2010	Snow White and the Seven Dwarfs	Prince Harry	Venue Cymru
September 2009	November 2010	The Rocky Horror Show	Brad Majors	Various Venues across the UK
18 January 2010	13 February 2010	The Rocky Horror Show	Brad Majors	Various Venues across the UK
20 March 2010	28 November 2010	Oklahoma!	Curly	Various venues across the UK and Italy
7 February 2011	10 December 2011	Wicked	Fiyero Tigelaar	Apollo Victoria Theatre
13 January 2012	6 October 2012	Ghost the Musical	Sam Wheat	Piccadilly Theatre
28 December 2012	Summer 2014	The Book of Mormon	Elder Kevin Price	Various venues across North America
11 August 2015	20 September 2015	The Fix	Cal Chandler	Signature Theatre (Arlington, Virginia)
6 November 2016	29 January 2017	Finian's Rainbow	Og	Irish Repertory Theatre
19 September 2017	6 January 2019	The Play That Goes Wrong	Director	Lyceum Theater
23 July 2019	27 October 2019	Waitress	Dr. Jim Pomatter	Brooks Atkinson Theatre
26 November 2019	4 January 2020	Mrs. Doubtfire	Stuart	5th Avenue Theatre
5 April 2020	29 May 2022	Mrs. Doubtfire	Stuart	Stephen Sondheim Theatre
24 December 2022	4 June 2023	Titanique	Cal	Daryl Roth Theatre
8 August 2023	17 September 2023	The Bridges of Madison County	Robert Kincaid	Signature Theatre
25 June 2024	30 June 2024	SpongeBob SquarePants	Squidward Q. Tentacles	Broadway Sacramento
19 October 2024	8 December 2024	Tammy Faye	Billy Graham	Palace Theatre
22 October 2025	22 November 2025	Pygmalion	Henry Higgins	Gingold Theatrical Group

== Recordings ==
In September 2010, Mark began to write his debut album. He decided to make his album personal and almost autobiographical of the 10 years since he had left his home in Wales. "The Journey Home" was released on Sain Records in 2011. The 12-track album features guest vocalists including Ysgol Glanaethwy and former Wicked co-star Ashleigh Gray. A Deluxe version of the album was released in 2012 and translates all the Welsh songs into English, with bonus tracks in Welsh. The single, "Unchained Melody", made for Evans' and Dillon's turn in Ghost, was added to the album.
