= Ryan Craig (playwright) =

British playwright (born 1972)

Ryan Craig (born 9 January 1972) is a British playwright, whose plays usually probe both social norms and ethical issues. He is also a writer for screen, television and radio.

Craig is best known for his plays What We Did To Weinstein (Menier Chocolate Factory, London, 2005), which earned him a Most Promising Playwright Nomination at the Evening Standard Theatre Awards; The Glass Room (Hampstead Theatre, 2006), which deals with Holocaust denial; and The Holy Rosenbergs (National Theatre, 2011); as well as for writing the English version of Tadeusz Słobodzianek's Our Class (National Theatre, 2009). His most recent plays are adaptations of George Orwell's 1984 and Jane Austen's Emma (Theatre Royal Bath, 2024 and 2025, respectively).

== Early life ==
Craig was born near Hampstead Heath, London, to parents of Jewish, Dutch and Northern Irish heritage. His father worked in the family rubber retail business, depicted in Craig's 2017 play Filthy Business.

When Craig was two he moved with his family to the up-and-coming suburb of Mill Hill in North West London and attended first Radlett Prep and then Haberdashers' Aske's in Elstree. For his twelfth birthday a school friend bought him the text of Harold Pinter's The Caretaker, of which he writes: “It blew my mind. The language, the anger, the humour. So close to the rhythms of my East End Jewish family.” Craig describes his family as “loud, talkative, argumentative, and possibly too close for its own good.”

Craig studied for a BA in History and Philosophy at the University of Leeds, graduating in 1994. In 1996, he completed an MA in Contemporary Theatre Practice run by Jonathan Lichtenstein at the University of Essex. There he studied with Mike Alfreds and Annie Castledine among others.

== Career in theatre ==
=== Early works ===
Craig's first play, The Sins of Dalia Baumgarten, was written for a directing project at Essex (1995). It is set predominantly in the ladies’ toilet at a Jewish wedding, and all of the characters have a secular London Jewish background, as do many of the characters in his subsequent plays. The Sins of Dalia Baumgarten was produced in June 1996 in London at the Etcetera Theatre, Camden. Described by Edward Simpkins in What's On as a portrait of a "drunken but cathartic social swirl", it caught the attention of Jack Bradley, at the time the literary manager of the National Theatre, and Bradley encouraged Craig to keep writing.

Craig next wrote Happy Savages, which John Peter in the Sunday Times characterized as a "tough, bruising play about vulnerable, bruised people". It was produced at the Lyric Studio, Hammersmith in 1998, with a cast including Kris Marshall and Hermione Gulliford, and after this Bradley offered Craig an eight-week writing attachment at the National Theatre Studio.

There followed an adaptation of Tom Sharpe's novel Vintage Stuff, in a touring production, and Three Servants, presented in 2002 at the Warehouse in Croydon. For Time Out reviewer Lucy Powell, the latter was a "neat, tightly choreographed play" inspired by "Japanese comic theatre, commedia dell'arte and The Arabian Nights".

=== Professional breakthrough ===
Craig's next play, What We Did To Weinstein, deals with a Jewish son returning from a traumatic event in the West Bank to tend to his famous writer father. Directed by Tim Supple, it premiered at the Menier Chocolate Factory in 2005 and earned Craig a Most Promising Playwright Nomination at the Evening Standard Theatre Awards. Nicholas de Jongh's review for the Evening Standard commented that the play "fascinates because it reflects the complex passions of Jews in more than two minds about what Jewishness entails". Charles Spencer in the Daily Telegraph praised its "theatrical vitality" and "vividly drawn characters", commenting that its "vaultingly ambitious" approach suggested parallels with recent work by Mike Leigh and David Edgar.

Also in 2005, Craig's play Broken Road won a Fringe First at the Edinburgh Fringe Festival. The play was set entirely in a moving car, prompting the Scotsman's reviewer Jay Richardson to call it "genuinely edge-of-the-seatbelt stuff". The production, directed by Carrie Cracknell, briefly transferred later that year to Battersea Arts Centre.

Craig's next stage play was The Glass Room (directed by Anthony Clark at Hampstead Theatre, 2006), which deals with Holocaust denial. Its two main characters are a historian, Elena, who denies that the Nazi gas chambers existed, and Myles, a human rights lawyer who defends her freedom of speech when she faces prosecution under new laws. Claire Allfree in Metro identified "verbal sparring" as the play's essential feature and argued that "Craig raises some excellent points about historical imperialism and the problem of maintaining individual freedom within a culture that believes in religious tolerance". Susannah Clapp of the Observer, who considered the play "adroitly phrased and arresting but too neatly patterned", commented that "Ryan Craig has carved out a distinctive dramatic niche for himself by writing debates about 21st-century Jewishness".

=== Work at the National Theatre ===
In 2009, Craig wrote an English version of Tadeusz Słobodzianek's Holocaust play Our Class, which was staged at the National Theatre. The cast of Bijan Sheibani's production included Amanda Hale, Paul Hickey, Edward Hogg, Sinead Matthews, Justin Salinger and Jason Watkins. Charles Spencer in the Daily Telegraph noted that "Bijan Sheibani's production of Ryan Craig's English version has a sober, documentary feel" and argued that it is the characters' "stark words ... that make the evening so chilling". Susannah Clapp in the Observer praised Craig's having "subtly translated" Słobodzianek, and John Nathan in the Jewish Chronicle referred to Craig "elegantly" rendering Słobodzianek's original.

Craig's next play was The Holy Rosenbergs, which premiered at the National Theatre in 2011, directed by Laurie Sansom and starring Henry Goodman. It centres on the North London Rosenberg family, kosher caterers, on the eve of their son's funeral. Danny, a pilot in the Israeli air-force, had been killed in action over Gaza; his sister, Ruth, is a lawyer investigating alleged human rights abuses by the Israeli Defence Forces. The play examines family conflict, guilt and the impact of Israeli politics within the London Jewish community. Critics compared the play to Arthur Miller's All My Sons and Death of a Salesman, and Craig indeed shares Miller's obsession with achieving ethical clarity in a nebulous world. Writing for The Arts Desk, Aleks Sierz applauded a play that "buzzes with discussion and debate", concluding that "In the clarity of its construction, the tension of its climax and the slow unveiling of its emotional core, this is a very fine play indeed". In The Times, Libby Purves wrote that "The play educates and provokes" and "is startlingly fair" – "clear, gripping, moving, at times extremely funny, and important".

From January 2012 to March 2013 Craig was Writer in Residence at the National Theatre Studio.

=== Works since 2017 ===
In 2017, Craig's play Filthy Business premiered at Hampstead Theatre, directed by Edward Hall and starring Sara Kestelman. Reviewing it in the Evening Standard, Henry Hitchings described it as "meaty", a "portrait of a volatile family ... spanning the years 1968 to 1982" that "pictures social change through the prism of commerce" and takes particular interest in "toxic tribalism". In the Daily Telegraph, Dominic Cavendish praised it as "valiant and valuable, daring to show Jewish folk on the make, warts and all". The play premiered in New Zealand, in a production by Auckland Theatre Company, in 2018.

Craig's comedy Games for Lovers premiered at Waterloo's Vaults in the summer of 2019, directed by Anthony Banks, with a cast including Evanna Lynch and Billy Postlethwaite. In the Guardian, Miriam Gillinson summed it up as a portrait of "four young people [who] scour the internet and hang out in bars, searching madly for love in all the wrong places" and commented that "A giddy carefreeness underpins this light-hearted new comedy about love in the internet age – it feels as if everyone is cutting loose for the summer."

In 2021 he published Writing in Coffee Shops, which "explores what practical tools the dramatist can use to write plays that build bridges between us" and "makes a case for the vitality of playwriting in our contemporary world".

His play Charlotte and Theodore, a two-hander, premiered at Bath's Ustinov Studio in February 2023. Directed by Terry Johnson, it starred Kris Marshall and Eve Ponsonby. It then had a short run at Richmond Theatre. In the Daily Telegraph, Dominic Cavendish characterized it as a "slow-burn but incendiary-feeling" study of white male privilege and cancel culture, reminiscent of David Mamet’s Oleanna.

== Thematic focus of Craig's plays ==
Craig was a founder member of a group of playwrights known as the "Monsterists", whose philosophy was expounded by David Eldridge in an article for the Guardian in 2005. The other members, besides Eldridge, included Richard Bean, Moira Buffini, Rebecca Lenkiewicz, Colin Teevan and Roy Williams. Among the principles of Monsterism were a commitment to large-scale drama unafraid of ambitious concepts and "the elevation of new theatre writing from the ghetto of the studio 'black box' to the main stage".

In an article entitled “Wesker’s Dream” (2014), Craig discussed his preoccupations as a writer and confirmed that his “theme is often the struggle between family, community and individual identity” and that while he often concentrates “on the rituals and codes of a North London Jewish family”, his target audience is not necessarily immigrant communities. “I believe such plays can redefine what it is to be British,” he writes, and he reflects on the difficulties inherent in writing about Jewish subjects for an audience in Britain today.

Interviewed in 2017 by Jessie Thompson for the Evening Standard, Craig remarked, "Just a cursory look at my output thus far will show a preoccupation with the theme of Jewish identity. I feel like the senile, old father in Wallander, obsessively painting the exact same section of forest, but with a different mood."

== Other writing ==
Craig's television work includes the Channel 4 drama Saddam's Tribe, in which Stanley Townsend played Saddam Hussein, as well as episodes of The Musketeers, Robin Hood, Hustle, and Waterloo Road (BBC).

Craig was writer in residence at BBC Radio Drama in 2005. His radio plays include A Question of Judgement, English in Afghanistan, The Lysistrata Project, Hold My Breath, Portugal, The Great Pursuit and Looking for Danny.

Critic Aleks Sierz has commented that Craig “learnt much of his craft by writing for television and radio.”

Oberon Books have published nine of his plays.

== Plays ==
- The Sins of Dalia Baumgarten (Etcetera Theatre) - 1996
- Happy Savages (Lyric Hammersmith Studio) - 1998
- Vintage Stuff (adapted from the novel by Tom Sharpe) (UK Tour) - 2000
- Three Servants (Jet Theatre) - 2002
- Portugal (English version of Zoltán Egressy's play) (National Theatre's Channels season) - 2004
- What We Did to Weinstein (Menier Chocolate Factory) - 2005. Nominated for Most Promising Playwright at Evening Standard Awards.
- Broken Road (Edinburgh Fringe) - 2005
- The Glass Room (Hampstead Theatre) - 2006
- Our Class (English version of Tadeusz Słobodzianek's play) (National Theatre) - 2009
- The Holy Rosenbergs (National Theatre) - 2011
- Talk Talk Fight Fight (Tricycle Theatre's The Bomb season) - 2012
- How To Think the Unthinkable (based on Antigone) (Unicorn Theatre) - 2012
- We Lost Elijah (National Theatre Connections) - 2013
- Filthy Business (Hampstead Theatre) - 2017
- Games for Lovers (Vaults) - 2019
- Charlotte and Theodore (Ustinov Studio) - 2023
- 1984 (adapted from the novel by Orwell) (Theatre Royal Bath) - 2024
- Emma (adapted from the novel by Austen) (Theatre Royal Bath) - 2025

other sources:

== Television ==
- Saddam's Tribe - 2007
- Robin Hood (2 episodes) - 2008
- Waterloo Road (2 episodes) - 2011
- Hustle (1 episode) - 2011

== Radio ==
- Looking for Danny (BBC Radio 4) - 2003
- Portugal (BBC Radio 3) - 2004
- Hold My Breath (BBC Radio 3) - 2005
- The Great Pursuit (Four-part adaptation of the novel by Tom Sharpe) (BBC Radio 4) - 2005
- The Lysistrata Project (BBC Radio 3) - 2006
- English in Afghanistan (BBC Radio 4) - 2010
