= The Secret Diary of Adrian Mole Aged 13¾ (musical) =

- The Musical
- Music: Pippa Cleary
- Lyrics: Jake Brunger; Pippa Cleary
- Book: Jake Brunger
- Basis: The Secret Diary of Adrian Mole, Aged 13¾ by Sue Townsend
- Premiere: 17 March 2015: Curve, Leicester
- Productions: 2015 Leicester; 2017 London; 2019 West End

The Secret Diary of Adrian Mole Aged 13¾ is a stage musical based on the young-adult novel of the same name by Sue Townsend. It features book and lyrics by Jake Brunger and music and lyrics by Pippa Cleary.

The musical made its world première at the Curve in Leicester in March 2015, followed by a London production at the Menier Chocolate Factory in summer 2017 and a West End run at the Ambassadors Theatre from June to September 2019.

== Production history ==
=== World premiere: Leicester (2015) ===
The musical was announced to make its world première at the Curve in Leicester (the title character and author Sue Townsend's hometown) from 7 March to 4 April 2015, with an official opening on 17 March.

The production was directed by Luke Sheppard, designed by Tom Rogers, choreographed by Tim Jackson. It was revealed upon the announcement by Townsend's husband, Colin Broadway, that Townsend had been working with the writers, Brunger and Cleary on the musical from 2012 to before her death in 2014.

=== Off-West End (2017) ===
The musical made its London debut in a new production at the Menier Chocolate Factory in Southwark from 14 July to 6 September 2017, with an official opening on 26 July.

The new production was again directed by Luke Sheppard and designed by Tom Rogers with new choreography by Rebecca Howell. The new production was presented by the Menier Chocolate Factory and Curve in association with Anthony Clare and David Ian Productions.

The cast from this production recorded the Original London Cast Recording which will be released on 28 June 2019 to coincide with the West End production.

=== West End (2019) ===
The Chocolate Factory production opened at the Ambassadors Theatre in the West End on 15 June 2019, playing a limited season, featuring a new cast (with the exceptions of Rosemary Ashe returning as Grandma from the Curve production and John Hopkins as Mr Lucas / Mr Scruton and Lara Denning as Miss Elf / Doreen Slater returning from the Menier Chocolate Factory production). The production was due to finish on 12 October 2019, however it was announced that it was due to close two weeks earlier than planned on 28 September 2019.

=== Hornchurch (2022) ===
The Queen's Theatre, Hornchurch presented the first actor-musician revival from 28 April to 21 May 2022. The production was directed by Douglas Rintoul, with musical direction by Tom Self, choreography by Sundeep Saini, set and costume design by Alfie Heywood, lighting by Sherry Coenen and sound by Chris Murray.

== Cast and characters ==
Character	Leicester	Off- West End	West End	Hornchurch
Character	2015	2017	2019	2022
Adrian Mole	Joel Fossard-Jones Lewis Andrews Sebastian Croft Toby Murray	Benjamin Lewis Ilan Galkoff Samuel Menhinick Guillermo Bedward	Rufus Kampa Aaron Gelkoff Michael Hawkins Nicholas Antoniou-Tibbitts James Levi	James Hameed
Pandora Braithwaite	Imogen Gurney Lulu-Mae Pears Elise Bugeja	Asha Banks Georgia Pemberton Lara Wollington	Matilda Hopkins Molly May Gibson Jessica Gill Riya Vyas Rebecca Nardin	Sally Cheng
Barry Kent	James McJannett-Smith Harrison Slater Edward Cross	Jason Rennie Callum Mcdonald Connor Davies	Aaron Shaw; Charlie Stripp Kobi Watson Jack Gale	Ben Williamson-Jones
Nigel	Kwame Kandekore Samuel Small George Barnden	Amir Wilson Edward Hooper Max Robson	Cuba Kamanu Jeremiah Davan Waysome Albert Green Regan Garcia	Luke Thornton
Grandma	Rosemary Ashe	Gay Soper	Rosemary Ashe	Claire Storey
Mr Lucas / Mr Scruton	Cameron Blakely	John Hopkins	John Hopkins	Dominic Gee-Burch
Miss Elf / Doreen Slater / Mrs Lucas	Amy Booth-Steel	Lara Denning	Lara Denning	Lauryn Redding
George Mole	Neil Ditt	Dean Chisnall	Andrew Langtree	Steve Simmonds
Pauline Mole	Kirsty Hoiles	Kelly Price	Amy Ellen Richardson	Sioned Saunders
Bert Baxter	Neil Salvage	Barry James	Ian Talbot	Tom Self

NB: The role of Mrs Lucas was cut for the London production.

== Critical reception ==
=== Leicester ===
The world premiere at Leicester's Curve Theatre Theatre received 4 stars from The Daily Telegraph, The Times and The Guardian. Lyn Gardner in The Guardian wrote that Mole was "a home-grown hit for the Curve... a show constantly paying neat homage to previous British musicals and the traditions of the TV sitcom, and yet always staying distinctive and true to its source material... a quaint, unassuming little charmer". Dominic Cavendish in The Telegraph wrote that "this all-singing, all-dancing Mole comes up trumps; in fact, it's so good it could burrow its way to the West End... the evening does that rare thing: it makes you laugh, tugs at your heart-strings and honours the spirit of the original while being playfully inventive... this fresh, funny, stirring spin on a Thatcher-era classic may be around for a long time to come." Dominic Maxwell in The Times wrote 'it's no small achievement to make this first musical version such a lively, evocative pleasure... amusing and affecting enough to leave you glowing... a thoroughly charming evening: faithful to the book but with a tenderness of its own.'

=== London ===
The 2017 London production at the Menier Chocolate Factory received 5 stars from The Evening Standard, The Independent and Whatsonstage.com, with 4-star reviews from The Daily Telegraph, The Times and The Guardian. Michael Billington in The Guardian described it as "A fresh and funny show from the young songwriting team of Jake Brunger (book and lyrics) and Pippa Cleary (music and lyrics). They clearly have the potential to inject new life into the anaemic British musical" with Fiona Mountford in The Evening Standard calling it 'a perfectly realised new British musical'. Ben Brantley also positively reviewed the musical in The New York Times, describing it as "a delightful new musical".
