= Menier Chocolate Factory =

Theatre in Southwark, London

- Official Logo

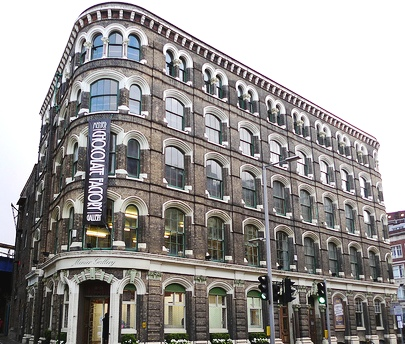
- Exterior of the theatre
- Interactive map of Menier Chocolate Factory
- Address: 4 O'Meara Street / 53 Southwark Street; London, SE1; England, United Kingdom
- Coordinates: 51.5051°N 0.0972°W
- Capacity: 180
- Type: Fringe theatre
- Public transit: London Bridge

Construction
- Opened: 2004; 22 years ago

Website
- menierchocolatefactory.com

The Menier Chocolate Factory is a 180-seat Off-West End theatre, which comprises a bar and theatre offices.

It is located at the rear of a former 1870s Menier Chocolate Company factory on the corner of O'Meara Street and Southwark Street, the latter being a major street in the London Borough of Southwark, central south London, England, some 2.5 km from the theatrical West End. The theatre stages plays and musicals, live music and stand-up comedy. According to the Evening Standard, it is "one of the most dynamic fringe venues in London".

== History and awards ==
The French Menier Chocolate Company expanded overseas and built a five-storey factory and warehouse of brick with stone dressings in London between 1865 and 1874. It was listed Grade II in 1996.

The Menier Chocolate Factory was opened in 2004 in its current incarnation. It is within a purpose built space at the rear of the factory, connecting through the adjoining buildings. The artistic director is David Babani. In 2005, the theatre received the Peter Brook/Empty Space Up and Coming Venue Award. In the same year, he and co-founder Danielle Tarento jointly won the Evening Standard Milton Shulman Award for Outstanding Newcomer. Tarento left in 2006 to pursue a solo producing career, and was replaced by General Manager Thomas Siracusa.

In 2007 the Chocolate Factory production of the Stephen Sondheim musical Sunday in the Park with George won five Olivier Awards, including Best Actor in a Musical for Daniel Evans and Best Actress in a Musical for Jenna Russell. The pair went on to perform the lead roles when the production transferred to Studio 54 on Broadway in February 2008.

At the 2009 Olivier Awards, Douglas Hodge won the trophy for Best Actor in a Musical for his portrayal of Albin in La Cage aux Folles. The production also won the Best Musical Revival category.

In 2010, the Chocolate Factory productions of A Little Night Music and La Cage aux Folles opened on Broadway, the former starring Catherine Zeta Jones and Angela Lansbury and the latter starring Douglas Hodge (from the original London production) and Kelsey Grammer. At the Tony Awards in 2010, the shows won in the following categories: Best Leading Actress in a Musical – Catherine Zeta Jones for A Little Night Music; Best Leading Actor in a Musical – Douglas Hodge for La Cage aux Folles; Best Director of a Musical – Terry Johnson for La Cage aux Folles; Best Musical Revival – La Cage aux Folles.

The theatre continues to produce a mixture of musical and play revivals, new writing and comedy.

== Productions ==
=== 2005 ===
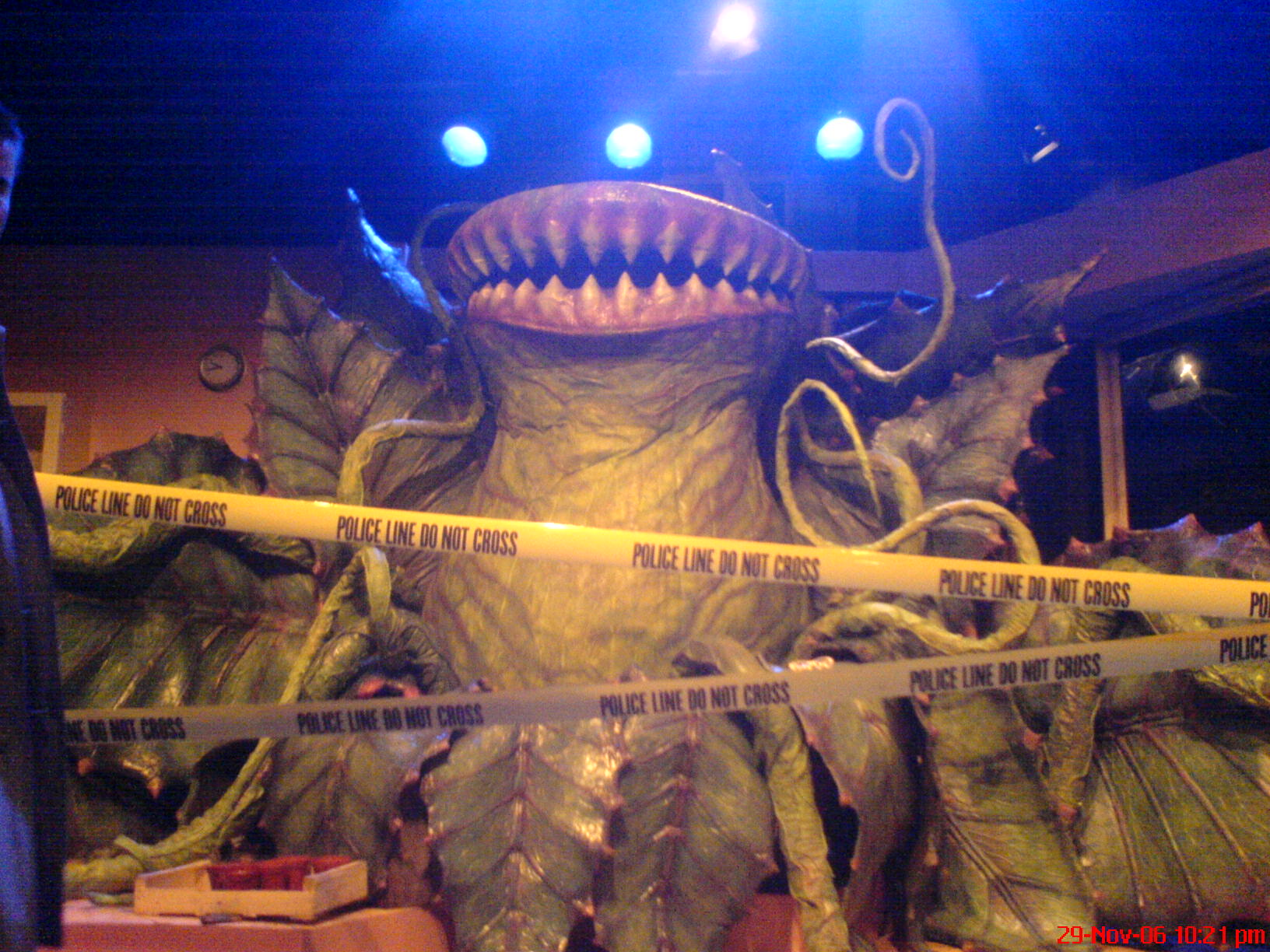
Audrey II from Little Shop of Horrors in 2006

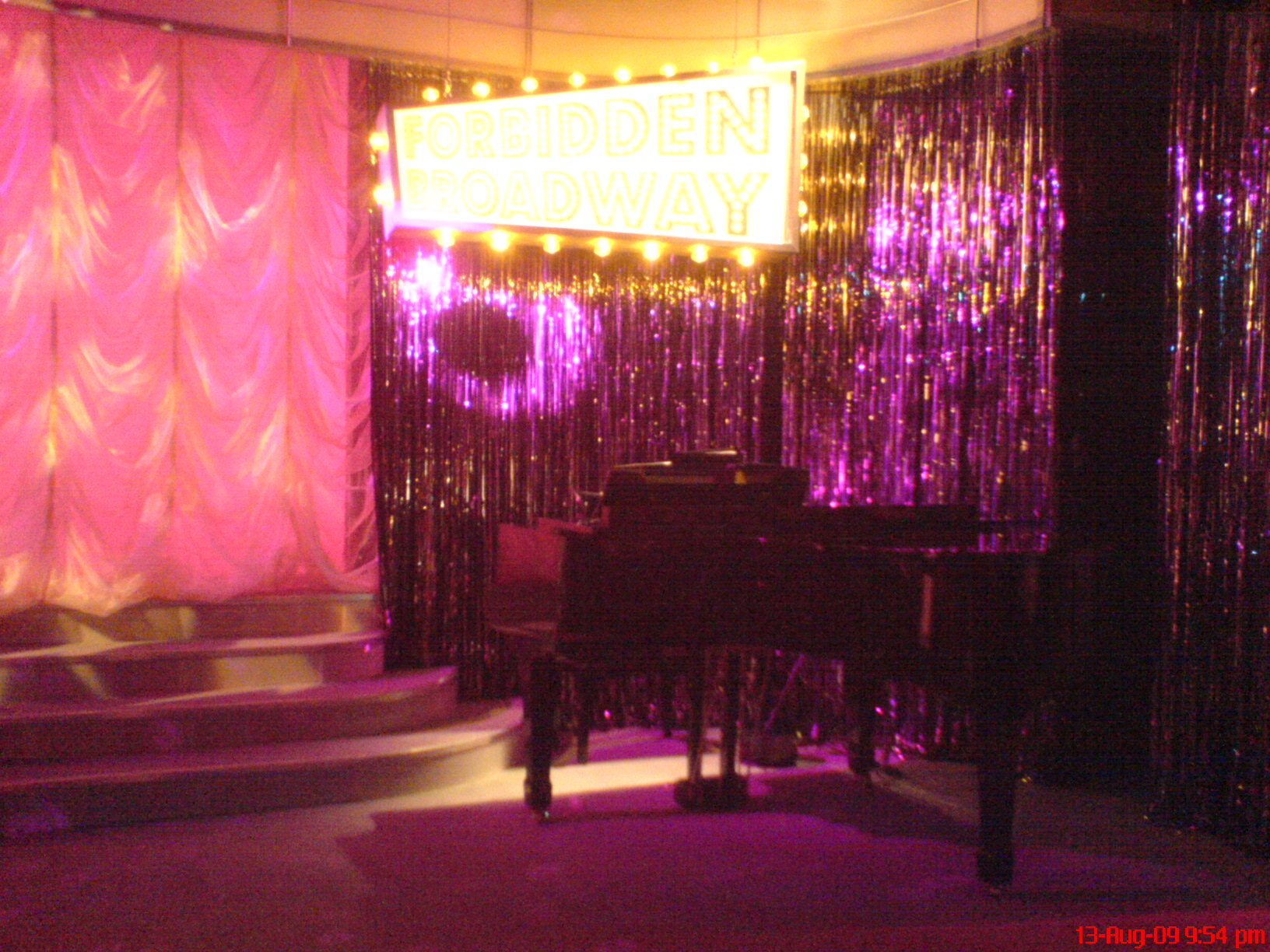
Forbidden Broadway in 2009

- Murderer by Anthony Shaffer – 10 November 2004 to 22 January 2005.
- This Other England (2005) – a series of new writing from Paines Plough, including Philip Ridley's controversial Mercury Fur.
- Tick, Tick... Boom! by Jonathan Larson – 31 May to 28 August 2005.
- What We Did to Weinstein by Ryan Craig – 21 September to 12 November 2005.

=== 2006 ===
- Sunday in the Park with George (November 2005), which won the 2005 Critics' Circle Theatre Award for Best Design. It transferred to the Wyndham's Theatre in May 2006, where it won five Olivier Awards. The production then transferred to Broadway in February 2008.
- Breakfast With Jonny Wilkinson by Chris England April 2006
- The Last Five Years by Jason Robert Brown – 18 July to 30 September 2006.
- Jeremy Lion For Your Entertainment by Justin Edwards October 2006
- Little Shop of Horrors starring Sheridan Smith and Paul Keating (November 2006), which transferred to the Duke of York's Theatre and then to the New Ambassadors where it closed on 8 September 2007. UK tour in 2009.

=== 2007 ===
- Total Eclipse by Christopher Hampton starring Daniel Evans 21 March – 20 May 2007
- Take Flight by Richard Maltby, David Shire and John Weidman July 2007
- Dealer's Choice by Patrick Marber starring Roger Lloyd-Pack – 17 September to 28 November 2007 and then 6 December 2007 to 29 March 2008 at Trafalgar Studios.

=== 2008 ===
- La Cage aux Folles (January – March 2008) A London revival, starring Philip Quast as Georges and Douglas Hodge as Albin/Zaza, opened on 8 January 2008 and played until 8 March, subsequently transferring to the West End from 20 October 2008, at the Playhouse Theatre.
- Maria Friedman Re-Arranged 19 March – 4 May 2008, subsequent transfer to Trafalgar Studios 27 November 2008 – 4 January 2009.
- The Common Pursuit starring James Dreyfus, Nigel Harman, Reece Shearsmith and Robert Portal (May – July 2008)
- They're Playing Our Song starring Connie Fisher and Alistair McGowan by Neil Simon, Marvin Hamlisch and Carole Bayer Sager 25 July – 28 September 2008
- The White Devil by John Webster 3 October – 15 November 2008

=== 2009 ===
- A Little Night Music starring Hannah Waddingham, Alexander Hanson and Maureen Lipman, 20 November 2008 – 8 March 2009, subsequently transferring to the West End from 28 March 2009, at the Garrick Theatre.
- Rookery Nook by Ben Travers (16 April – 20 June 2009).
- Forbidden Broadway by Gerard Alessandrini – 25 June to 13 September 2009.
- Talent by Victoria Wood – 17 September to 14 November 2009.

=== 2010 ===
- Sweet Charity starring Tamzin Outhwaite Book by Neil Simon, Music by Cy Coleman and Lyrics by Dorothy Fields – 21 November 2009 to 7 March 2010.
- Hannah Waddingham Live at the Chocolate Factory – 16 to 20 March 2010
- The Willy Russell Season (in repertoire): Shirley Valentine starring Meera Syal and Educating Rita starring Larry Lamb and Laura Dos Santos – 26 March to 8 May 2010.
- Aspects of Love by Andrew Lloyd Webber, Don Black and Charles Hart 7 July – 26 September 2010
- A Number by Caryl Churchill starring Samuel West and Timothy West September – November 2010

=== 2011 ===
- The Invisible Man by Ken Hill 13 November 2010 – 13 February 2011
- Ruby Wax: Losing It 15 Feb – 19 March 2011 subsequent transfer to Duchess Theatre September 2011
- Smash! by Jack Rosenthal 24 March – 8 May 2011
- Road Show by Stephen Sondheim and John Weidman – European Premiere June 2011
- Terrible Advice by Saul Rubinek starring Scott Bakula, Caroline Quentin, Andy Nyman, Sharon Horgan dir. Frank Oz- September 2011

=== 2012 ===
- Pippin by Stephen Schwartz and Roger O. Hirson – 22 November 2011 – 25 February 2012
- Abigail's Party by Mike Leigh – 2 March to 21 April 2012 subsequent transfer to Wyndham's Theatre May – September 2012 and UK Tour throughout 2013.
- Torch Song Trilogy by Harvey Fierstein 30 May to 12 August 2012
- Without You by Anthony Rapp August 2012
- Charley's Aunt by Brandon Thomas starring Mathew Horne and Jane Asher 20 September – 10 Nov

=== 2013 ===
- Merrily We Roll Along by Stephen Sondheim and George Furth 22 Nov – 9 March 2013. Subsequent transfer to Harold Pinter Theatre 23 April – 27 July
- Proof by David Auburn starring Mariah Gale from March 2013 to April 2013.
- Travels With My Aunt by Graham Greene during May and June 2013.
- The Color Purple by Alice Walker from 5 July to 14 September 2013.
- The Lyons by Nicky Silver from 19 September to 16 November 2013.

=== 2014 ===
- Candide by Leonard Bernstein from 23 November 2013 to March 2014.
- Two Into One by Ray Cooney from 8 March 2014 to 26 April.
- Fame: Not The Musical by David Baddiel from 29 April 2014 to 23 May 2014
- Life of the Party by Andrew Lippa from 27 May 2014 to 14 June 2014.
- Forbidden Broadway by Gerard Alessandrini from 18 June 2014 to 30 August 2014.
- Fully Committed by Becky Mode from 3 September 2014 to 15 November 2014.
- Assassins by Stephen Sondheim and John Weidman from 21 November 2014 to 7 March 2015.

=== 2015 ===
- Buyer & Cellar by Jonathan Tolins from 12 March to 2 May. Starring Michael Urie.
- Communicating Doors by Alan Ayckbourn from 7 May to 27 June.
- What's It All About by Kyle Riabko from 6 July to 5 September. Subsequent transfer to the Criterion Theatre 16 October – 14 February.
- Dinner with Saddam by Anthony Horowitz from 10 September to 14 November.
- Funny Girl by Jule Styne, Bob Merrill and Isobel Lennart (revised by Harvey Fierstein) from 20 November to 5 March 2016. Starring Sheridan Smith Subsequent transfer to the Savoy Theatre 9 April – 8 October. and UK and Ireland tour 18 February to 19 August 2017.

=== 2016 ===
- The Truth by Florian Zeller from 10 March to 7 May. Subsequent transfer to the Wyndham's Theatre 27 June – 3 September
- My Family: Not The Sitcom by David Baddiel from 10 May 2016 to 25 June 2016
- Into the Woods by Stephen Sondheim and James Lapine from 1 July to 17 September
- Travesties by Tom Stoppard starring Tom Hollander from September 2016. Subsequent transfer to Apollo Theatre 3 February – 29 April
- She Loves Me by Joe Masteroff, Sheldon Harnick and Jerry Bock from 25 November to 4 March 2017. Starring Scarlett Strallen.

=== 2017 ===
- Love in Idleness by Terence Rattigan from 10 March to 29 April. Starring Anthony Head, Eve Best, Helen George and Edward Bluemel.
- Lettice and Lovage by Peter Shaffer from 4 May to 8 July
- The Secret Diary of Adrian Mole, Aged 13¾ by Jake Bruger and Pippa Cleary from 14 July to 9 September.
- The Lie by Florian Zeller from 14 September to 18 November. Starring Samantha Bond, James Dreyfus, Tony Gardner, Alex Gilbreath.
- Barnum by Cy Coleman, Michael Stewart and Mark Bramble from 25 November to 3 March 2018.

=== 2018 ===
- Kiss of the Spider Woman by José Rivera and Allan Barker from 8 March to 5 May. Directed by Laurie Sansom. Starring Samuel Barnett and Declan Bennett.
- The Grönholm Method by Jordi Galceran from 10 May – 7 July. Directed by BT McNicholl. Cast includes Jonathan Cake, Greg McHugh, Laura Pitt-Pulford and John Gordon Sinclair.
- Spamilton by Gerard Alessandrini from 12 July – 15 September.
- Pack of Lies by Hugh Whitemore from 20 September – 17 November. Directed by Hannah Chissick. Starring Finty Williams and Jasper Britton.
- Fiddler on the Roof by Jerry Bock, Sheldon Harnick and Joseph Stein from 23 November – 9 March 2019. Directed by Trevor Nunn.

=== 2019 ===
- The Bay at Nice by David Hare from 14 March – 4 May. Directed by Richard Eyre. Cast includes Martin Hutson, Ophelia Lovibond, David Rintoul and Penelope Wilton.
- Orpheus Descending by Tennessee Williams from 9 May – 6 July (co-production with Theatr Clwyd). Directed by Tamara Harvey. Cast includes Hattie Morahan, Jemima Rooper and Seth Nimrich.
- The Bridges of Madison County by Marsha Norman and Jason Robert Brown from 13 July – 14 September. Directed by Trevor Nunn. Cast includes Jenna Russell.
- The Watsons by Laura Wade from 20 September – 16 November. Directed by Samuel West.
- The Boy Friend by Sandy Wilson from 22 November – 7 March 2020. Directed by Matthew White. Transferred to the Prince of Wales Theatre (Toronto, Canada) from March 2020.

=== 2020 ===
- Indecent by Paula Vogel from 13 – 15 March. Directed by Rebecca Taichman.

=== 2021 ===
- Indecent from 3 September – 27 November.
- Habeas Corpus from 3 December 2021 – 26 February 2022.

=== 2022 ===
- Maria Friedman & Friends from 3 March – 17 April.
- The Sex Party from 4 November 2022 – 7 January 2023.

=== 2023 ===
- Just for Us from 11 January – 26 February.
- Marjorie Prime from 9 March – 6 May. Directed by Dominic Dromgoole.
- Pacific Overtures from 25 November 2023 – 24 February 2024. Directed by Matthew White.

=== 2024 ===
- Power of Sail from 20 March – 12 May. Directed by Dominic Dromgoole.
- Jerry's Girls from 18 May – 29 June. Directed by Hannah Chissick.
- The Baker's Wife from 6 July – 14 September. Directed by Gordon Greenberg.
- The Cabinet Minister from 21 September – 16 November.
- The Producers from 24 November 2024 – 1 March 2025. Directed by Patrick Marber. Transferred to the West End, at the Garrick Theatre from August 2025 until September 2026.

=== 2025 ===
- Dracula, A Comedy of Terrors from 8 March – 3 May. Directed by Gordon Greenberg.
- Trevor Ashley is Liza in Typsy from 7 – 11 May. Featuring Trevor Ashley as Liza Minnelli.
- Elephant from 22 May – 28 June. Directed by Jess Edwards. Written, composed, and performed by Anoushka Lucas.
- Fallen Angels from 21 November 2025 – 21 February 2026. Directed by Christopher Luscombe

=== 2026 ===
- Coward And Friends with Janie Dee And Stefan Bednarczyk on 25 January 2026 only.
- Tru from 19 September – 14 November. Directed by Rob Ashford, starring Jesse Tyler Ferguson.
- Fourteen Again from 21 November 2026 – 27 February 2027. Musical directed by Jonathan O'Boyle, based on songs by Victoria Wood and book by Tom MacRae. Starring Neil Morrisey.
