= Jet Set Go! =

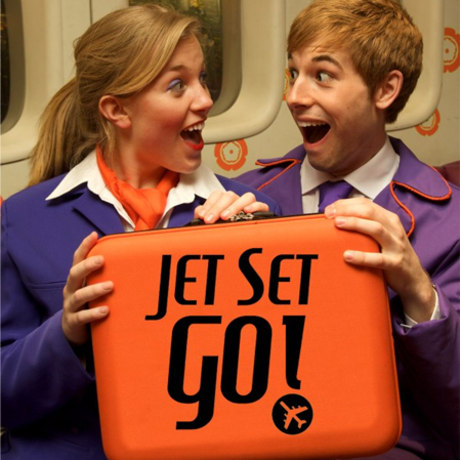
- Music: Pippa Cleary
- Lyrics: Jake Brunger; Pippa Cleary
- Book: Jake Brunger
- Productions: 2008 Edinburgh Festival Fringe; 2008 Theatre 503; 2009 Jermyn Street Theatre

Jet Set Go! is a British musical comedy written by Jake Brunger and Pippa Cleary, with Brunger writing book and lyrics and Cleary writing music and lyrics.

== Production history ==
Jet Set Go! premiered at the 2008 Edinburgh Festival Fringe at George Square Theatre under the inaugural ‘Musicals at George Square’ season, directed by Luke Sheppard. The production subsequently transferred to Theatre 503 in London, where the run sold out in advance of opening night.

== Plot ==
Jet Set Go! is about a transatlantic cabin crew and their two pilots who fly to New York and back. The musical follows their antics and adventures both on board the plane and as they take on Manhattan for a one-night stopover. The musical was inspired by Brunger staying in the same hotel in New York as the Virgin Atlantic cabin crew.

== Characters ==
The Cabin Crew:

- Nicola : The head stewardess, friendly but firm.
- Hayley : The Welsh stewardess, bubbly and energetic.
- Melanie : The new stewardess, eager to please but nervous.
- Julia : The Puerto Rican stewardess, fiery and highly sexed.
- Ryan : The camp steward, catty but good fun.
- Richard : The straight-acting gay steward, caring and thoughtful.

The Pilots:

- Jim : The Captain, cocky but loveable.
- Paul : His First Officer, sweet natured but bumbling.

== Musical numbers ==
- "Welcome Aboard" - Company
- "What Do You Actually Do?" - Hayley, Melanie, Ryan, Julia
- "The Pilot Song" - Jim with Paul, Melanie and Julia
- "24 Things in 24 Hours" - Company
- "You Drive Me Crazy" - Richard and Ryan
- "Dance with Me" - Paul with Melanie
- "If I Could Find a Boy" - Richard
- "Salsa" - Julia
- "Cabin Fever" - Nicola with Company ‡
- "If I Could a Boy (reprise)" - Ryan
- "Going Home" - Nicola with Hayley
- "Dance with Me (reprise)" - Paul
- "A Simple Valley Song" - Hayley
- "Finale" - Company

‡ Cabin Fever was written for the 2009 production at Jermyn Street Theatre, and remains in the published version.

== Cast and creative ==
The original Edinburgh / Theatre 503 production was directed and choreographed by Luke Sheppard, designed by Katie Bellman with costumes by Enver Chakartash. The Jermyn Street Theatre production was again directed and choreographed by Luke Sheppard and designed by Mike Lees.

Character	Original Edinburgh and Theatre 503 cast	Jermyn Street Theatre Cast
Nicola	Sarah Barratt	Laura Scott
Hayley	Katie Birtill	Amy Coombes
Melanie	Maddie Moate	Danielle Corlass
Julia	Kaytee Crook	Emily Sidonie
Ryan	Alex Johnston	John McManus
Richard	Mark Senior	Mark Evans
Jim	Tom Lee	Philip Riley
Paul	Nick Cork	Tim Driesen

== Critical reception ==
Jet Set Go! received positive reviews both in Edinburgh and London. Of the printed press, Dominic Cavendish in The Daily Telegraph described it as ‘a delightful, inventive and witty new musical’ and Jay Richardson in The Scotsman wrote 'Jet Set Go! is one of those rare, unexpected delights'.

The 2009 production at Jermyn Street Theatre received Time Out's Critics’ Choice, with Time Out describing it as On the Town for the budget airline generation'.

The online press were equally enthusiastic. Whatsonstage.com wrote "this shiny, happy, high flying show deserves a long haul and should become a cult must see" and Broadwayworld.com called it "a sheer delight from take-off to landing.. a fantastic crowd-pleaser of a show".

== Licensing ==
Jet Set Go! is published and licensed by Josef Weinbeger Ltd. The first licensed production was at Cambridge University in February 2011, who also took their production to the 2011 Edinburgh Festival Fringe, where it received rave reviews. It has also been produced by numerous youth theatres and Universities.
