= Rosemary Ashe =

English actress (born 1953)

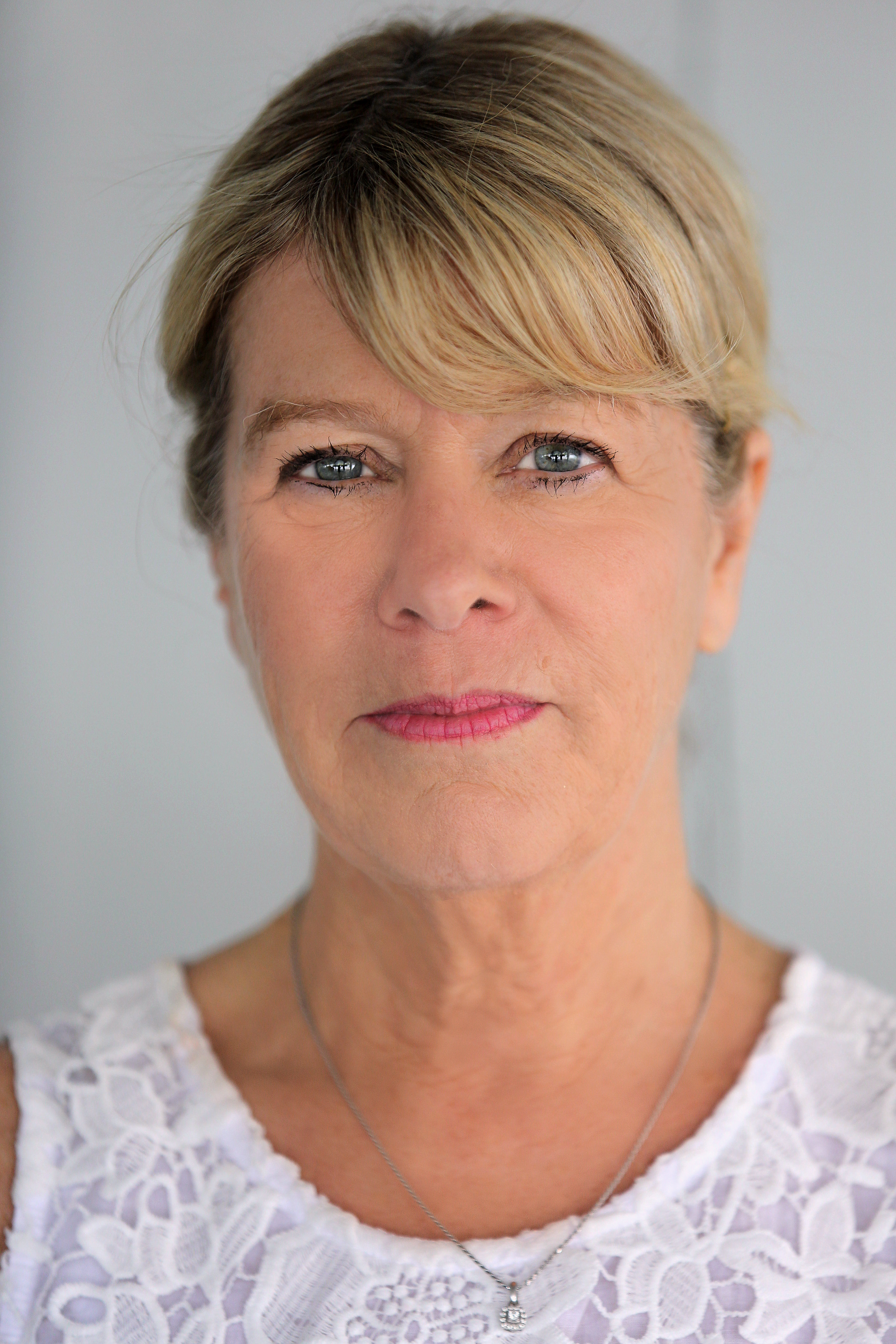
- Born: Rosemary Elizabeth Ashe; 28 March 1953 (age 73)
- Occupations: Stage actress and singer

Rosemary Elizabeth Ashe (born 28 March 1953) is an English stage actress and singer.

== Early life and training ==
She was born to Philip Stephen Ashe and Dorothy May (née Watts). She attended Lowestoft Grammar School before studying at the Royal Academy of Music.

== Career ==
Her wealth of theatre roles include Carlotta in the original cast of The Phantom of the Opera (Her Majesty's), Madame Thenardier in Les Misérables (Palace Theatre), Widow Corney in Oliver! (London Palladium), Hortense in The Boy Friend (The Albery), Forbidden Broadway (The Fortune), Felicia Gabriel in The Witches of Eastwick (Theatre Royal, Drury Lane) (for which she was nominated for a Laurence Olivier Award for Best Supporting Performance in a Musical), Miss Andrew in Mary Poppins (Prince Edward), Lottie Grady in When We Are Married (The Garrick), and Grandma Mole in The Secret Diary of Adrian Mole Aged 13¾ (The Ambassadors). Also:Call Me Merman (tour), Betty in The Great American Trailer Park Musical (Waterloo East Theatre), Miss Bleacher in Crush (tour), Kate Hoey MP in Committee (Donmar Warehouse), Tonight at 8.30 (Jermyn St Theatre), and The Old Lady in Candide (Iford & Grange Park Festivals).

She has appeared with English National Opera, Opera North, Scottish Opera, Sadlers Wells Opera, Opera Northern Ireland and Carl Rosa in many different roles; including Musetta in La bohème, Helene in La belle Hélène, Frasquita in Carmen and Despina in Così fan tutte. Television and radio appearances include: Doctors, An Audience With Ronnie Corbett, The House of Eliott, Cosi Fan Tutte, The Beggar's Opera and Friday Night is Music Night, Songs From the Shows and In Tune.

She has taught at the Royal Conservatoire of Scotland, the Royal Academy of Music, Guildford School of Acting, Arts Educational Schools, Musical Theatre Academy and London School of Musical Theatre.

== Awards and nominations ==
Ashe received an Olivier Award nomination, for 'Best Supporting Performance in a Musical' in 2001 for her role in The Witches of Eastwick.

== Recordings ==
In 2004, she recorded a song for the CD Weird & Wonderful – A Collection of Songs by Alexander S. Bermange celebrating weirdos and weirdness, featuring sixteen West End stars (released on Dress Circle Records).

She can be heard on the cast recordings of The Phantom of the Opera, The Boy Friend, Bitter Sweet, Kismet, The Student Prince, Song of Norway, Oliver!, The Killer Soprano, The Witches of Eastwick, Serious Cabaret, and Mary Poppins amongst others.
