= Everyman Theatre, Cheltenham =

Theatre in Cheltenham, England

Coordinates: 51.89967°N 2.07509°W

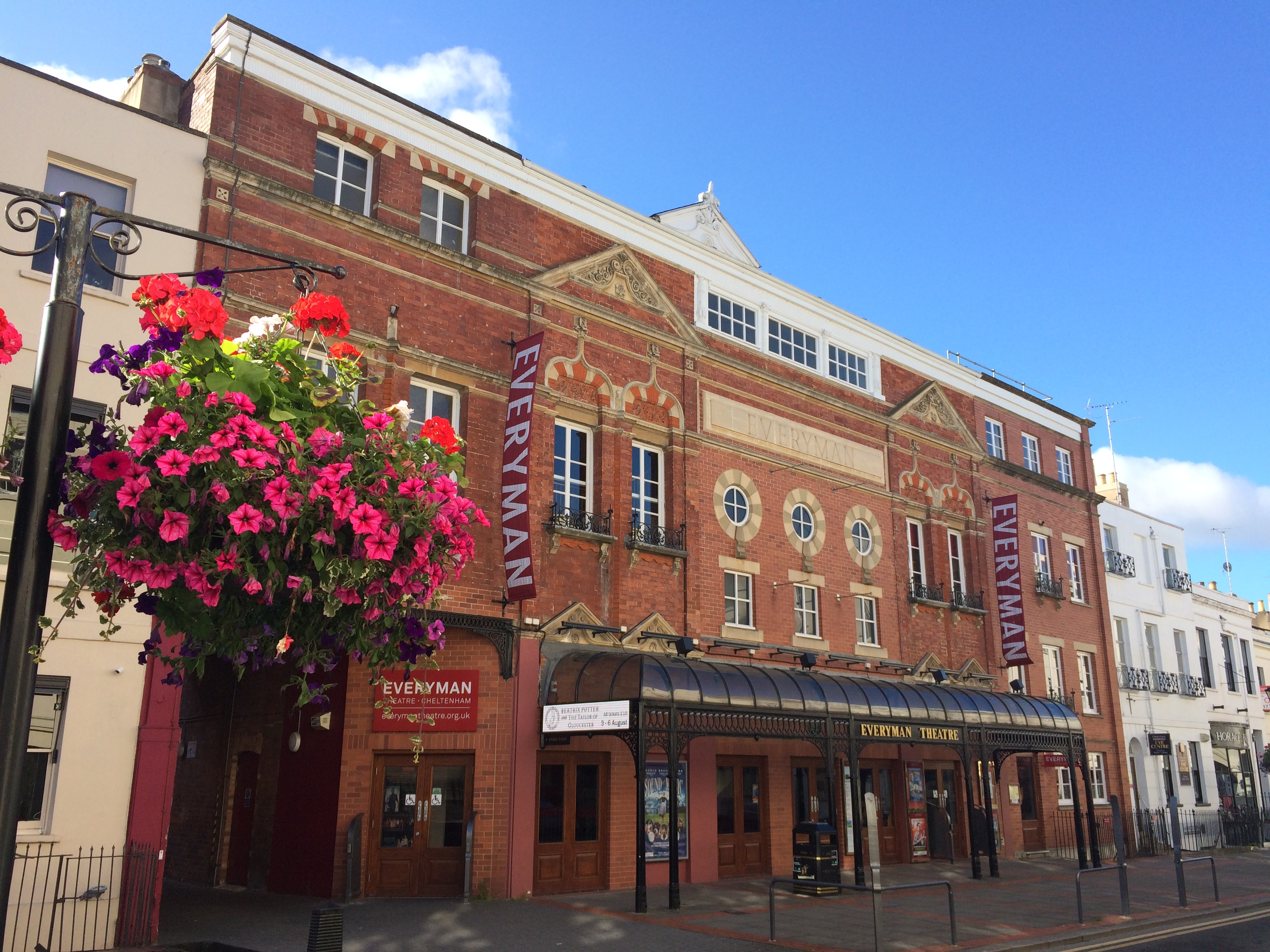

Everyman Theatre is a theatre based in Regent Street, Cheltenham. There are two auditoria in the building: the 718-seat main auditorium and the 60-seat Studio Theatre, originally named the Ralph Richardson Studio after Ralph Richardson.

== History ==
The Grade II listed building was designed by Frank Matcham and was originally called the New Theatre and Opera House. It was opened on 1 October 1891 with a performance by Lillie Langtry in 'Lady Clancarty'. When it was first built, the theatre seated around 1,500 people on bench seating.

In 1929, the New Theatre and Opera House gained a licence to screen cinema, so becoming a multi-purpose theatre. The licence stipulated the building must continue to present live performance as well as cinema.

In World War II, the theatre became a Garrison Theatre, continuing to present theatre throughout the war years to civilians and the US soldiers based at Pittville. Many actors from London left the capital to escape the Blitz, bringing big names to Cheltenham.

The Cheltenham Corporation ran the building after World War II until 1960. In 1959 the building closed and was at risk of being sold. The Cheltenham Theatre Association published an advertisement in September 1959 advertising "Urgent - Wanted £3,000 at once, to re-open Cheltenham Opera House".

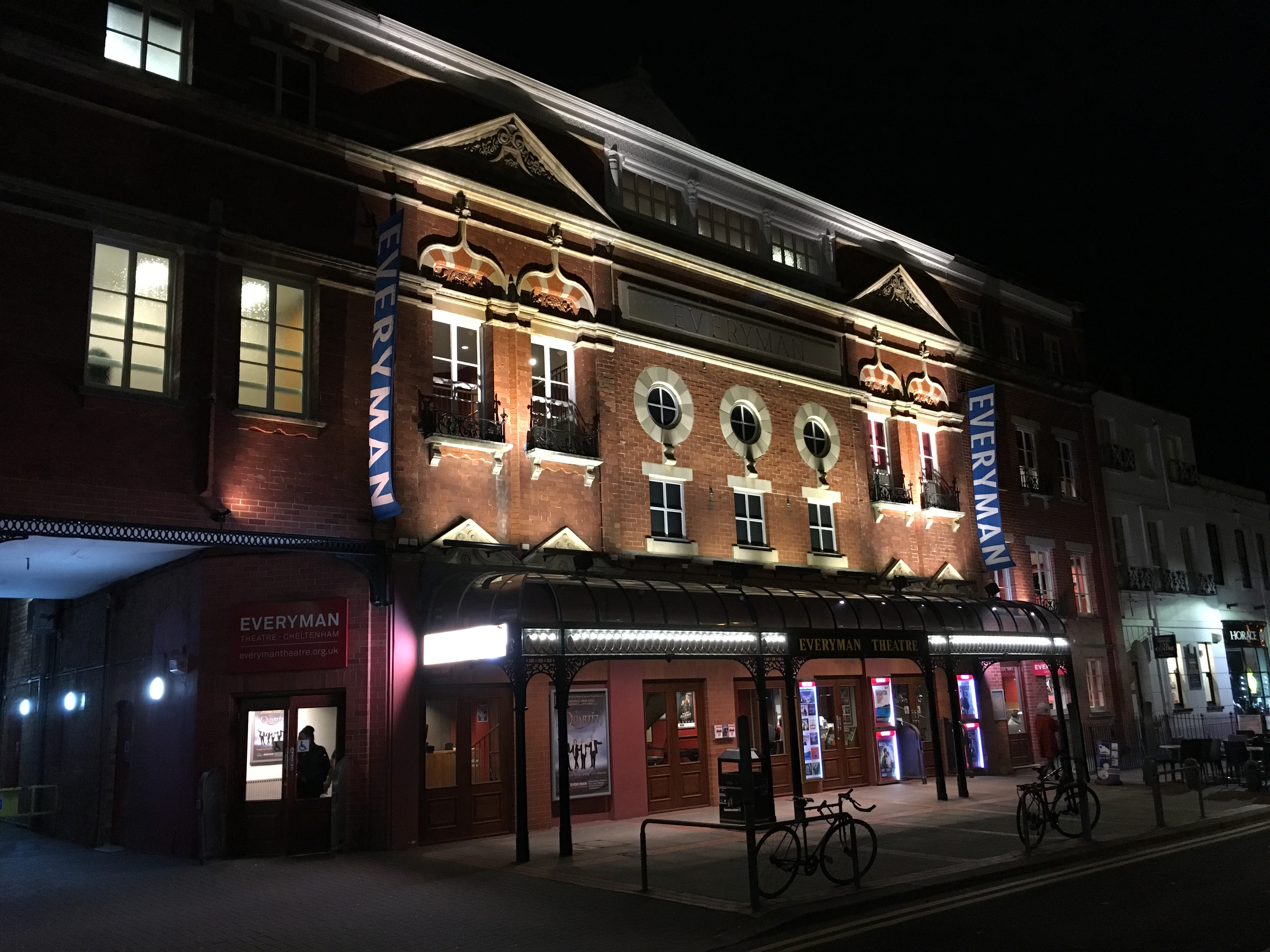

In May 1960, the Cheltenham Theatre Association published another advertisement titled "Great News", which announced that the Everyman Theatre would open on Monday 22 May 1960 with a world premiere presentation of N.C. Hunter's A Piece of Silver, starring Joyce Heron and Esmond Knight. The Cheltenham Theatre Association rebranded itself as the Everyman Theatre Association (ETA). It enjoyed booking advantages and raised money for the Theatre. Its 50th anniversary in 2010 was a great success; sadly, Covid lockdown prevented the 60th. Members enjoyed a variety of social activities, but, even before lockdown, support diminished and the ETA was wound up in late 2021. The benefits transferred to a new Priority Access Membership scheme administered directly by the theatre.

On re-opening in 1960, the Everyman Theatre operated as a Repertory Theatre with several household names being part of the rep, including William Gaunt, Steven Berkoff, Windsor Davies and Penelope Keith.

The theatre closed in 1983 to coincide with the development of the Regent Arcade, during which the building underwent significant rebuilding and refurbishment. The theatre reopened in 1986 with a production of My Fair Lady, starring Jacqueline Dankworth.

The Everyman Theatre is the oldest surviving working Matcham Auditorium.

In 2023, the pantomime Mother Goose removed an anti-vegan song from the show after complaints from audiences.

== 2011 refurbishment ==
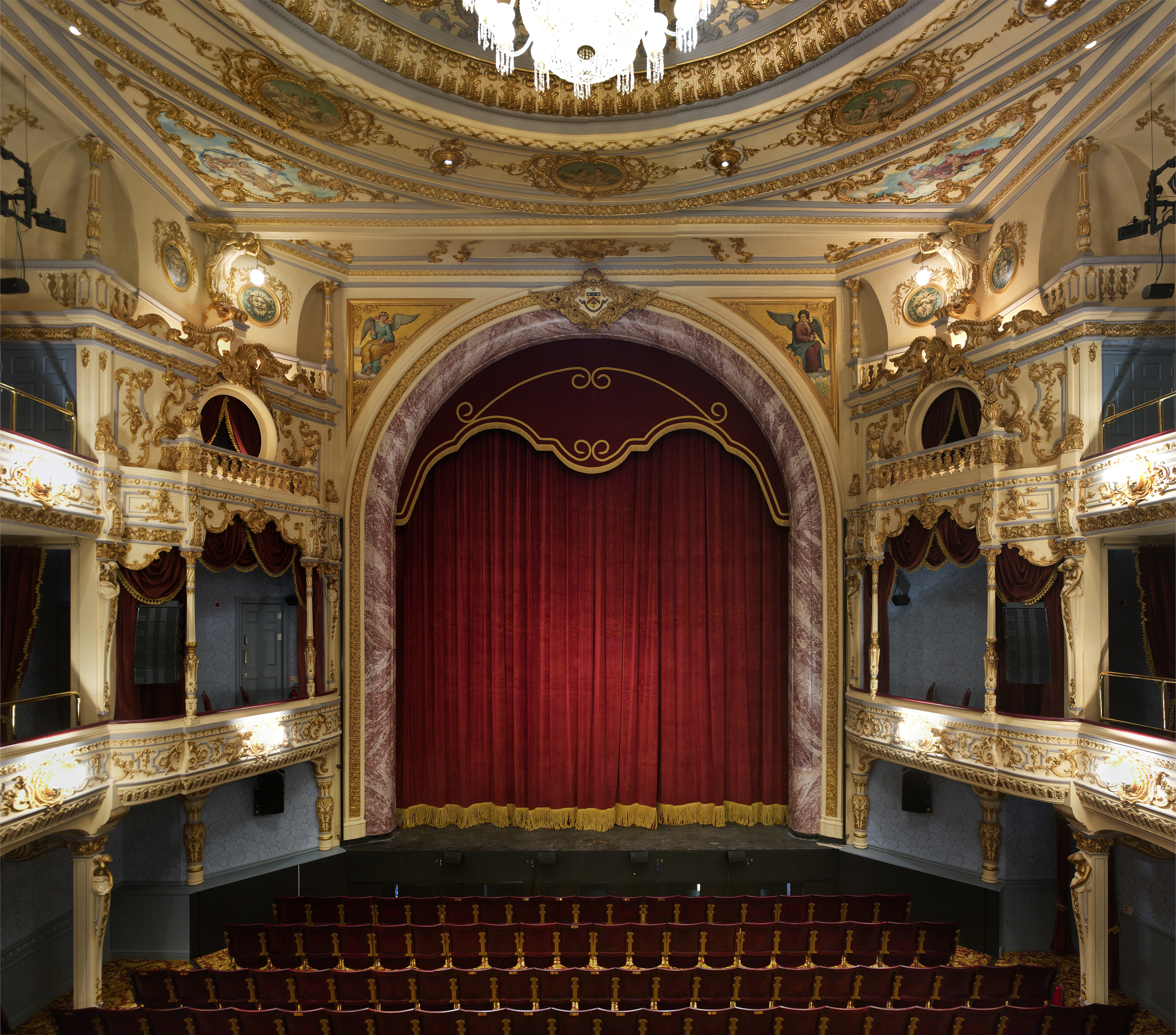

In 2011, the theatre closed in early May for a £3.2 million refurbishment. During the refurbishment, the main auditorium was restored and returned to a decorative style resembling Frank Matcham's original style, including bespoke wallpaper and carpets, painting by fine arts and replacement of cherubs around the auditorium. The pink paint on the iconic narrow and high Opera House proscenium arch was removed to reveal the original Scagliola marble. Above the proscenium arch, the spandrels were restored to put original paintings representing the angels of Comedy and Tragedy back in place. The theatre reopened in September 2011 with a performance by Ken Dodd.

== See also ==
- The Playhouse (Cheltenham)
