= David Hibbard (stage actor) =

American stage performer

David Hibbard (born June 21, 1965, in Spokane, Washington, raised in Ohio) is an American stage performer, primarily known for Broadway musicals and television commercial voiceovers. Since 1999, Hibbard has been a teacher of vocal performance and audition technique at Collaborative Arts Project 21 (CAP21), once affiliated with New York University Tisch School of the Arts and now a part of Molloy College in Rockville Centre, Long Island with studio space at Molloy College Manhattan Center.

== Career ==
Hibbard made his Broadway debut in Cats in 1993 in the role of the Rum Tum Tugger at the Winter Garden Theatre. Next was a Once Upon A Mattress revival in the role of the Jester, starring Sarah Jessica Parker and Jane Krakowski, which opened on December 19, 1996, at the Broadhurst Theatre and ran for 188 performances. Hibbard originated the role of Bobby/Michael Bennett in A Class Act. The musical was initially produced Off-Broadway by Manhattan Theatre Club opening on October 3, 2000, and running until December 10, 2000. A Class Act transferred to the Ambassador Theatre on Broadway, where it opened on March 11, 2001, and ran for 30 previews and 105 regular performances. Hibbard replaced Michael McGrath in Monty Python's Spamalot in the role of Patsy, singing "Always Look on the Bright Side of Life". Hibbard joined the Broadway production of Billy Elliot The Musical in June 2009 and later toured the US in the second national tour.

Hibbard was in the 2012–2013 production of Elf: The Musical in the role of Matthews. Hibbard was also seen in Something Rotten!, an original musical comedy with a book by John O'Farrell and Karey Kirkpatrick and music and lyrics by Karey and Wayne Kirkpatrick. He understudied four roles; Nick Bottom, Nostradamus, Shylock and Lord Clapham, in addition to performing in the ensemble nightly. Something Rotten! opened on Broadway at the St. James Theatre in previews on March 23, 2015, and officially opened on April 22, 2015. It was nominated for ten Tony Awards, including Best Musical, and won one (Christian Borle as Best Featured Actor in a Musical). Its cast album received a nomination for the 2016 Grammy Award for Best Musical Theater Album. Most recently Hibbard was seen in Mrs. Doubtfire, a musical with music and lyrics by Wayne and Karey Kirkpatrick and a book by Karey Kirkpatrick and John O'Farrell. It is based on the 1993 film of the same name. The musical is directed by Jerry Zaks with choreography by Lorin Latarro. Rob McClure plays the role of Daniel Hillard/Mrs. Doubtfire, with Jenn Gambatese as Miranda Hillard, Brad Oscar as Frank Hillard, Analise Scarpaci as Lydia Hillard, Jake Ryan Flynn as Christopher Hillard, Avery Sell as Natalie Hillard, J. Harrison Ghee as Andre, Mark Evans as Stuart Dunmire, Charity Angél Dawson as Wanda Sellner, and Peter Bartlett as Mr. Jolly. Hibbard portrayed a number of supporting roles.

Off-Broadway, David was seen in the 2014 Jack Plotnick and Seth Rudetsky production of Disaster! (musical) the musical, in the role of Tony. David was in the original company of Forbidden Broadway Strikes Back!, a version of Forbidden Broadway created by Gerard Alessandrini. It previewed on Thursday September 5 and opened at the Triad Theater on Wednesday October 16, 1996, with Bryan Batt, Donna English and Christine Pedi. Hibbard has also appeared Off-Broadway as Hercule in Can-Can at City Center Encores!. The staged concert production featured Patti Lupone as La Mome Pistache, Michael Nouri, Charlotte d'Amboise (Claudine), Reg Rogers and Eli Wallach. This production was directed by Lonny Price and choreographed by Casey Nicholaw.

Hibbard's notable voice-over work is showcased in Page to Screen, an American documentary television series hosted by Peter Gallagher. The series premiered October 28, 2002. on Bravo

Hibbard is a graduate of Ohio State University with a degree in music education and in addition to being on faculty at Molloy/CAP21 Theater Arts Program, he is one of the program directors of the Molloy College Musical Theater Summer Intensive at the Madison Theater.
