= Doubtfire =

Doubtfire may refer to:

- Madame Doubtfire, a novel
- Mrs. Doubtfire, a film
- Mrs. Doubtfire (musical)
