= Mrs. Doubtfire (musical) =

American stage musical

- The New Musical Comedy
- Promotional Logo
- Music: Karey Kirkpatrick; Wayne Kirkpatrick
- Lyrics: Karey Kirkpatrick; Wayne Kirkpatrick
- Book: Karey Kirkpatrick; John O'Farrell
- Basis: Mrs. Doubtfire by Randi Mayem Singer; Leslie Dixon; Alias Madame Doubtfire by Anne Fine
- Premiere: November 16, 2019: 5th Avenue Theatre, Seattle
- Productions: 2019 Seattle; 2021 Broadway; 2022 Manchester; 2023 West End; 2023 National Tour; 2024 Rio de Janeiro; 2025 São Paulo

Mrs. Doubtfire is a musical based on the 1993 film Mrs. Doubtfire, which in turn is based on the 1987 novel Madame Doubtfire by Anne Fine, with music and lyrics by Karey and Wayne Kirkpatrick and a book by Karey Kirkpatrick and John O'Farrell. The musical is produced by Kevin McCollum and presented by special arrangement with Buena Vista Theatrical.

As with the film, the musical is set in the city of San Francisco, California. However, the timeframe has been updated to the 21st century. The stage musical has references to both technology and pop culture that did not exist in 1993 when the film was released.

== Background ==
In 2013, producer Kevin McCollum had signed a deal with 20th Century Fox to develop some of the films from its back catalog into musicals for the stage. A musical adaptation of Mrs. Doubtfire was in the works in 2015, with music by Alan Menken, lyrics by David Zippel, and a book by Harvey Fierstein (who played Frank Hillard in the movie). McCollum had previously spoken to The New York Times in 2013 about the 1993 movie's musical prospects, noting that the plot was "tailored for Broadway audiences". However, three years later, Menken told that the project was put on 'creative hiatus', citing changes in the creative team as the problem. Nevertheless, in 2018, McCollum revealed that the adaptation was still aiming for a Broadway bow, but with an entirely different creative team which includes Karey and Wayne Kirkpatrick composing the score, and John O'Farrell and Karey Kirkpatrick writing the book. Tony Award-winner Jerry Zaks became the director of the show.

On May 16 and 17, 2019, the musical held a reading with a cast including Rob McClure, Kate Baldwin, Mario Cantone, and Jake Ryan Flynn.

== Productions ==
The musical is directed by Jerry Zaks with choreography by Lorin Latarro and music supervision, arrangements and orchestrations by Ethan Popp. Rob McClure plays the role of Daniel Hillard/Mrs. Doubtfire, with Jenn Gambatese as Miranda Hillard, Brad Oscar as Frank Hillard, Analise Scarpaci as Lydia Hillard, Jake Ryan Flynn as Christopher Hillard, Avery Sell as Natalie Hillard, J. Harrison Ghee as Andre, Mark Evans as Stuart Dunmire, Charity Angél Dawson as Wanda Sellner, and Peter Bartlett as Mr. Jolly. The cast originally included the late Doreen Montalvo as Janet Lundy. Montalvo performed in the Seattle tryout and the three pre-COVID Broadway previews, but died suddenly in October 2020.

=== Seattle (2019-2020) ===
The musical made its world premiere at the 5th Avenue Theatre in Seattle, Washington, beginning previews on November 26, 2019, with an official opening on December 13, with an intention to run until December 29 before being extended due to popular demand until January 4, 2020.

=== Broadway (2021–2022) ===
Mrs. Doubtfire began Broadway previews on March 9, 2020, at the Stephen Sondheim Theatre, with a planned opening night the following month. Due to the Governor's response to the COVID-19 pandemic, all Broadway productions were suspended on March 12, 2020. Mrs. Doubtfire resumed previews on October 21, 2021, officially opening December 5. The production went on hiatus from January 10, 2022, through April 14. A month after reopening, producers announced the production would close on May 29, 2022, after 43 previews and 83 regular performances.

=== Manchester (2022) ===
On November 5, 2021, it was announced that the musical will make its UK premiere at the Manchester Opera House the following year, opening on 2 September, and running until 1 October. The run received generally favourable reviews.

=== London (2023–2025) ===
On November 15, 2022, it was announced that the musical will transfer to London's Shaftesbury Theatre, opening on 12 May 2023.

The show started previews on 12 May 2023 before a Gala performance on 18 June 2023. The production stars Gabriel Vick as the title role, alongside Laura Tebbutt as Miranda; Carla Dixon Hernandez as Lydia; Samuel Edwards as Stuart; and Cameron Blakely and Marcus Collins as Frank and Andre. The show opened to positive reviews.

The production announced it would close on 26 April 2025, with plans to tour the world to be announced.

=== First North American Tour (2023-2024) ===
In April 2023, it was announced that the show would embark on a North American national tour in fall 2023. The tour began performances on September 24, 2023 at Shea's Performing Arts Center in Buffalo, New York and closed on November 24, 2024 at the Fox Cities Performing Arts Center in Appleton, Wisconsin. In July 2023, it was announced that Rob McClure would reprise his Tony Award-nominated role as Daniel Hillard/Mrs.Doubtfire for the national tour. His real-life wife Maggie Lakis will also join the tour as Miranda Hillard. In August 2023, full casting was announced. Joining McClure and Lakis are Giselle Gutierrez as Lydia Hillard, Aaron Kaburick as Frank Hillard, Nik Alexander as Andre Mayem, Leo Roberts as Stuart Dunmire, Romelda Teron Benjamin as Wanda Sellner, Cody Sawyer Braverman and Axel Bernard Rimmele as Christopher Hillard, and Emerson Mae Chan and Kennedy Alexandra Pitney as Natalie Hillard.

=== Brazil (2024-2025) ===
In July 2024, it was announced that Eduardo Sterblitch would star in the Brazilian production of Uma Babá Quase Perfeita – O Musical, playing Daniel Hillard/Mrs. Doubtfire. The musical began performances on October 3, 2024 at Teatro Multiplan in Rio de Janeiro and closed on November 24, 2024. Following its Rio de Janeiro run, the production embarked on a second season in São Paulo, beginning on March 12, 2025 at Teatro Liberdade and closing on May 11, 2025. The show is directed by Tadeu Aguiar, with musical direction by Liliane Secco and choreography by Sueli Guerra.

In August 2024, full casting was announced. Joining Sterblitch in the Rio de Janeiro season were Thais Piza as Miranda Hillard, Lara Suleiman as Lydia Hillard, Bernardo Destri as Christopher Hillard, and Bibi Valverde as Natalie Hillard. Additional cast members included Rainer Cadete as Frank Hillard, Willian Sancar as André Mayem, Rafael Aragão as Stuart Dunmire, Diego Becker as Mr. Jolly, Simone Centurione as Wanda Sellner, and Giovanna Sassi as Janet Lundy, along with a full ensemble.

For the São Paulo season, the cast featured some changes: Gabriella Di Grecco assumed the role of Lydia Hillard, and Fabrizio Gorziza took over the role of Frank Hillard.

=== Second North American Tour (2025) ===
A second non-equity North American tour began on September 4, 2025 at the Clemens Center in Elmira, New York with performances scheduled through August 2026. Craig Allen Smith was cast as Daniel Hillard/Mrs. Doubtfire, starring alongside Melissa Campbell as Miranda Hillard, Alanis Sophia as Lydia Hillard, Brian Kalinowski as Frank Hillard, and DeVon Wycovia Buchanan as Andre Mayem.

Since February 2026, the role of Lydia Hillard has been played by Giulia Marolda.

=== Germany (2025) ===
The musical opened at the Capitol Theater, Düsseldorf on October 31, 2025, booking until April 12, 2026.

=== UK and Ireland Tour (2026) ===
On April 28, 2025, it was announced that the musical would begin a UK and Ireland tour at the Birmingham Hippodrome on August 13, 2026. Gabriel Vick is set to reprise his role as Daniel Hillard/Mrs. Doubtfire from the London production.

== Musical numbers ==
Source: Playbill

=== 2021 Broadway Production ===
Act I

- "What's Wrong with This Picture" – Lydia, Miranda, Daniel, Christopher, Ensemble
- "I Want to Be There" – Daniel
- "Make Me a Woman" – Daniel, Andre, Frank, Ensemble
- "What the Hell" – Lydia, Natalie, Christopher
- "The Mr. Jolly Show" – Mr. Jolly, Ensemble
- “Easy Peasy" – Daniel, Ensemble
- "The Mr. Jolly Show” (Reprise) – Mr. Jolly, Ensemble
- "About Time" – Daniel
- "Rockin’ Now" – Daniel, Frank, Andre, Lydia, Christopher, Ensemble

Act II

- “Entr’acte” – Orchestra
- "The Shape of Things to Come" – Miranda, Female Ensemble
- "Big Fat No" – Stuart, Daniel, Male Ensemble
- "Let Go" – Miranda
- "Clean Up This Mess" – Daniel
- "Playing with Fire" – Wanda, Ensemble
- "He Lied to Me" – Flamenco Singer, Flamenco Dancers
- "Just Pretend" – Daniel, Lydia
- "As Long as There Is Love" – Full Company

=== 2023 North American Tour and London Production ===
Act I

- "That's Daniel" – Lydia, Miranda, Daniel, Ensemble
- "I Want to Be There" – Daniel
- "I Want to Be There" (Reprise) – Daniel
- "Try a Little Harder" – Daniel
- "Make Me a Woman" – Daniel, Andre, Frank, Ensemble
- "What the Hell" – Lydia, Natalie, Christopher
- "The Mr. Jolly Show" – Mr. Jolly, Ensemble
- "So Long From Mr. Jolly" – Mr. Jolly, Ensemble
- “Easy Peasy" – Daniel, Ensemble
- "I Want to Be There" (Reprise) – Daniel
- "The Mr. Jolly Show” (Reprise) – Mr. Jolly, Ensemble
- "About Time" – Daniel
- "Rockin’ Now" – Daniel, Frank, Andre, Lydia, Christopher, Natalie, Ensemble

Act II

- “Entr’acte” – Orchestra
- "The Shape of Things to Come" – Miranda, Daniel, Female Ensemble
- "Big Fat No" – Stuart, Daniel, Male Ensemble
- "Let Go" – Miranda
- "Clean It Up/What The Hell (Reprise)" – Daniel, Lydia, Christopher, Natalie
- "Playing with Fire" – Full Company
- "Welcome to La Rosa" – Maire-d and Waiters
- "He Lied to Me" – Flamenco Singer, Flamenco Dancers
- "Just Pretend" – Daniel, Lydia
- "As Long as There Is Love" – Full Company

== Cast and characters ==
Character	Seattle	Broadway	West End	North American Tour	Rio de Janeiro, Brazil	São Paulo, Brazil
Character	2019	2021	2023		2024	2025
Daniel Hillard/Mrs. Doubtfire	Rob McClure	Rob McClure	Gabriel Vick	Rob McClure	Eduardo Sterblich	Eduardo Sterblich
Miranda Hillard	Jenn Gambatese	Jenn Gambatese	Laura Tebbutt	Maggie Lakis	Thais Piza	Thais Piza
Frank Hillard	Brad Oscar	Brad Oscar	Cameron Blakely	Aaron Kaburick	Rainer Cadete	Fabrizio Gorziza
Mr. Jolly	Peter Bartlett	Peter Bartlett	Ian Talbot	David Hibbard	Diego Becker	Diego Becker
Wanda Sellner	Charity Angél Dawson	Charity Angél Dawson	Kelly Agbowu	Romelda Teron Benjamin	Simone Centurione	Simone Centurione
Stuart Dunmire	Mark Evans	Mark Evans	Samuel Edwards	Leo Roberts	Rafael Aragão	Rafael Aragão
Andre Mayem	J. Harrison Ghee	J. Harrison Ghee	Marcus Collins	Nik Alexander	Willian Sancar	Willian Sancar
Lydia Hillard	Analise Scarpaci	Analise Scarpaci	Carla Dixon-Hernandez	Giselle Gutierrez	Lara Suleiman	Gabriela Di Grecco
Christopher Hillard	Jake Ryan Flynn	Jake Ryan Flynn	Max Bispham; Elliot Mugume; Frankie Treadaway	Cody Braverman; Axel Bernard Rimmele	Bernardo Destri; Guilherme Ribeiro; Matheus Dantas	Bernardo Destri; Guilherme Ribeiro; Matheus Dantas
Natalie Hillard	Avery Sell	Avery Sell	Scarlett Davies; Ava Posniak; Angelica-Pearl Scott	Emerson Mae Chan; Kennedy Pitney	Bibi Valverde; Malu Miranda; Valentina Reis	Bibi Valverde; Malu Miranda; Valentina Reis
Janet Lundy	Doreen Montalvo	Jodi Kimura	Micha Richardson	Jodi Kimura	Giovanna Sassi	Giovanna Sassi
Flamenco Singer	Aléna Watters	Aléna Watters	Lisa Mathieson	Lannie Rubio	Fabi Figueiredo	Fabi Figueiredo

== Reception ==
The Broadway production received mixed reviews, with praise for the cast, namely McClure, Scarpaci, Oscar, and Bartlett. However, some of the characters and plot points were criticized for feeling written as tired and forgettable. Likewise, the score was mostly criticized for being unmemorable, though enjoyable.

== Awards and nominations ==
Year	Award	Category	Nominee	Result
2022	Drama Desk Awards			
2022	Drama Desk Awards	Outstanding Actor in a Musical	Rob McClure	Nominated
2022	Drama Desk Awards	Outstanding Wig and Hair Design	David Brian Brown	Won
2022	Outer Critics Circle Award	Outstanding New Broadway Musical		Nominated
2022	Outer Critics Circle Award	Outstanding Actor in a Musical	Rob McClure	Nominated
2022	Outer Critics Circle Award	Outstanding Direction of a Musical	Jerry Zaks	Nominated
2022	Outer Critics Circle Award	Outstanding Book of a Musical	Karey Kirkpatrick and John O'Farrell	Nominated
2022	Outer Critics Circle Award	Outstanding New Score	Karey Kirkpatrick and Wayne Kirkpatrick	Nominated
2022	Outer Critics Circle Award	Outstanding Costume Design	Catherine Zuber	Nominated
2022	Tony Awards	Best Actor in a Musical	Rob McClure	Nominated
