= Fruity Pie =

Taiwanese television series

- Also known as: Grandma Fruity Pie; Mrs. Fruity Pie
- Genre: Children's television series; Educational; Fantasy comedy
- Created by: Chao Tzu Chiang
- Based on: the Euphegenia's House concept from Mrs. Doubtfire by Chris Columbus and Madame Doubtfire by Anne Fine
- Developed by: Chao Tzu Chiang
- Written by: Chao Tzu Chiang
- Directed by: Chao Tzu Chiang
- Creative director: Chao Tzu Chiang
- Presented by: Chao Tzu Chiang
- Starring: Chao Tzu Chiang
- Voices of: Chiu Mei Chun; Chen Huangdian; Li Hui; Jiang Xuanyu; Fan Naiyun; Liang Xinru; Chen Xinwen; Wang Ruiqin; Dai Xiangqian
- Theme music composer: Chao Tzu Chiang
- Composer: Chao Tzu Chiang
- Country of origin: Taiwan
- Original languages: Mandarin; Taiwanese Hokkien
- No. of seasons: 28
- No. of episodes: 2800+

Production
- Executive producer: Ding Xiaojing
- Producer: Lin Qiongfen
- Running time: 30 min.
- Production company: Public Television Service

Original release
- Network: Public Television Service
- Release: July 2, 1998

Fruity Pie (Chinese: 水果冰淇淋, lit. "Fruit Ice Cream") is a children's educational television show produced by the Taiwan Public Television Service.

== Setting and premise ==
Fruity Pie takes place in a store run by "Granny Fruity Pie." Her friends Chi Chi, Lin Lin, Sarah, and Walu are talking banana children portrayed by puppets who live with her. It also features a mermaid named Mei Ling who comes out singing from her shell leading to a song from the show. The show features stories and songs that sometimes teach like counting.

== Broadcast ==
In the United States, Fruity Pie airs weekdays at 8:30am on KTSF 26/San Francisco.

== See also ==
- Mrs. Doubtfire
