= AATW =

AATW may refer to:

- Airborne, All the Way, motto of American Paratroopers
- "All Along the Watchtower", a song written by Bob Dylan
- All Along the Watchtower (TV series), a British sitcom
- All Around the World Productions, a record company
- Anarchists Against the Wall, an Israeli direct action group
- Asleep at the Wheel, an American western swing band
