= Jack & Jill (TV series) =

American comedy-drama TV series

- Genre: Comedy drama
- Created by: Randi Mayem Singer
- Starring: Ivan Sergei; Amanda Peet; Sarah Paulson; Jaime Pressly; Justin Kirk; Simon Rex
- Opening theme: "Truth About Romeo" performed by Pancho's Lament
- Country of origin: United States
- Original language: English
- No. of seasons: 2
- No. of episodes: 32

Production
- Executive producers: Mark Canton and Randi Mayem Singer
- Running time: 42 minutes
- Production companies: The Canton Company; 22¢ Films; Warner Bros. Television

Original release
- Network: The WB
- Release: September 26, 1999 – April 11, 2001

Jack & Jill is an American comedy-drama television series created and produced by Randi Mayem Singer. It ran from September 26, 1999, to April 15, 2001, on The WB. The series stars Ivan Sergei, Amanda Peet, Sarah Paulson, Jaime Pressly, Justin Kirk, and Simon Rex.

== Premise ==
Jacqueline Barrett abandons her unfaithful fiancé at the altar and heads to New York City (where her friend Audrey works as a dancer) to rebuild her life. Moving into Audrey's apartment, she encounters David Jillefsky, who's preparing to move in with his girlfriend Elisa. Jacqueline and David develop a hot and cold romantic relationship, but face obstacles in their relationships with their friends.

== Cast ==
- Ivan Sergei as David "Jill" Jillefsky
- Amanda Peet as Jacqueline "Jack" Barrett
- Sarah Paulson as Elisa Cronkite
- Jaime Pressly as Audrey Griffin
- Justin Kirk as Barto Zane
- Simon Rex as Mikey Russo

== Production ==
The main characters were David Jillefsky (Ivan Sergei) and Jacqueline Barrett (Amanda Peet, replacing Amelia Heinle after the pilot). The two become romantically involved just as they both face major obstacles in their relationships with their friends. The show's theme song was "Truth About Romeo" written by Pancho's Lament, the stage name of songwriter Jeff Cohen. It was performed by Pancho's Lament during the first season and by David Crosby and Beth Hart in the second season.

Due to the average ratings of the first season, the second season was only 13 episodes long and was aired as a midseason show. The final episode detailed the problems during preparations for the couple's wedding. Jacqueline discovered she was pregnant, but before she could tell David, he decided that their relationship was moving too fast and he wanted to call the wedding off and move things slower. Despite the rallying of fans, the series was not renewed for a third season, so the series ended in a cliffhanger.

Co-stars Amanda Peet and Sarah Paulson would later reunite for the NBC series Studio 60 on the Sunset Strip, which debuted in 2006.

== Episodes ==
=== Series overview ===
Season	Episodes	Originally released	
Season	Episodes	First released	Last released
1	19	September 26, 1999	March 19, 2000
2	13	January 10, 2001	April 11, 2001

=== Season 1 (1999–2000) ===
No. overall	No. in season	Title	Directed by	Written by	Original release date	Prod. code
1	1	"Pilot" [or "Jack & Jill"] "These Are the Days"	James Frawley	Randi Mayem Singer	September 26, 1999	225701
2	2	"The Awful Truth"	Stephen Cragg	Randi Mayem Singer	October 3, 1999	225702
3	3	"Moving On"	Kristoffer Tabori	Sandy Isaac	October 10, 1999	225703
4	4	"Welcome to the Working Week"	Stephen Cragg	Ed Redlich	October 17, 1999	225704
5	5	"Not Just a River in Egypt"	Dennie Gordon	Rina Mimoun & Randi Mayem Singer	October 24, 1999	225705
6	6	"She Ain't Heavy"	John Whitesell	Becky Hartman Edwards & Tim Davis & Peter Saisselin	November 7, 1999	225706
7	7	"Fear and Loathing in Gotham"	Bruce Seth Green	Remi Aubuchon	November 14, 1999	225707
8	8	"Men Will Be Boys"	Bethany Rooney	Sandy Issac	November 21, 1999	225708
9	9	"Pseudos, Sex and Sidebars"	David Petrarca	Randi Mayem Singer	December 19, 1999	225709
10	10	"To Be Perfectly Honest"	Sandy Smolan	Rina Mimoun	January 9, 2000	225710
11	11	"Bad Timing and Dirty Laundry"	Mel Damski	Randi Mayem Singer	January 16, 2000	225711
12	12	"When You Wish Upon a Car"	Patrick Norris	David T. Levinson	January 23, 2000	225712
13	13	"Animal Planet, Part 1"	Dennie Gordon	Peter Saisselin & Tim Davis	February 6, 2000	225713
14	14	"Animal Planet, Part 2"	Mel Damski	Becky Hartman Edwards	February 13, 2000	225714
15	15	"The !@#$%^& Future"	Dennie Gordon	Rina Mimoun	February 20, 2000	225715
16	16	"Under Pressure"	Michael Katleman	Randi Mayem Singer & Rina Mimoun	February 27, 2000	225716
17	17	"Lovers and Other Strangers"	David Petrarca	Remi Aubuchon	March 5, 2000	225717
18	18	"A Key Exchange"	Mike Pavone	Rina Mimoun	March 12, 2000	225718
19	19	"Starstuck"	Alan Myerson	Becky Hartman Edwards & Sandy Isaac	March 19, 2000	225719

=== Season 2 (2001) ===
No. overall	No. in season	Title	Directed by	Written by	Original release date	Prod. code
20	1	"What Weddings Do to People"	Mike Pavone	Randi Mayem Singer	January 10, 2001	226751
21	2	"Seriously, All Coma Proposals Aside..."	David Petrarca	Rina Mimoun	January 17, 2001	226752
22	3	"Caution: Parents Crossing"	David Petrarca	Tim Davis and Peter Saisselin	January 24, 2001	226754
23	4	"California Dreamin'"	Mel Damski	Becky Hartman Edwards	January 31, 2001	226753
24	5	"Chivas and Lies"	Michael Katleman	Tom Spezialy	February 7, 2001	226755
25	6	"Pressure Points"	Randall Miller	Rina Mimoun	February 14, 2001	226756
26	7	"Crazy Like a Fox, Hungry Like the Wolf..."	Michael Katleman	Randi Mayem Singer and Rina Mimoun	February 28, 2001	226757
27	8	"The Big Bounce"	Lev L. Spiro	Nick Harding	March 7, 2001	226758
28	9	"Becky Hartman Edwards"	Adam Nimoy	Nick Harding	March 14, 2001	226759
29	10	"Battle of the Bahamas"	Keith Samples	Kevin Murphy	March 21, 2001	226760
30	11	"Bag Full of Love"	Mel Damski	Tom Spezialy	March 28, 2001	226761
31	12	"...And Nothing but the Truth" [Part 1]	Mike Pavone	Tim Davis and Peter Siasselin	April 4, 2001	226762
32	13	"...And Jack & Jill Came Down the Hill" [Part 2]	Mike Pavone	Rina Mimoun	April 11, 2001	226763

== Reception ==
The series was nominated for an Artios Award in 2000 by the Casting Society of America for Dramatic Pilot Casting.
