= John O'Farrell (author) =

British author, scriptwriter, and political campaigner (born 1962)

- Born: 27 March 1962 (age 64); Maidenhead, Berkshire, England
- Education: University of Exeter
- Occupation: Writer
- Writing career
- Period: 1986–present
- Genres: Fiction, nonfiction

John O'Farrell (born 27 March 1962) is a British author, comedy scriptwriter and political campaigner. Previously a lead writer for such shows as Spitting Image and Have I Got News for You, he is now best known as a comic author for such books such as The Man Who Forgot His Wife and An Utterly Impartial History of Britain. He is one of a small number of British writers to have achieved best-seller status with both fiction and nonfiction. His books have been translated into around thirty languages and adapted for radio and television.

O'Farrell co-wrote the musical Something Rotten!, which opened on Broadway in April 2015, and co-wrote a Broadway musical of Mrs. Doubtfire which opened on Broadway in December 2021 and in London's West End in May 2023. He wrote the musical Just for One Day based on the story of the 1985 benefit concert Live Aid which had its world premiere at The Old Vic in London on 13 February 2024.

== Early life ==
O'Farrell grew up in Maidenhead, Berkshire, the youngest of three children, attending Courthouse Primary School and then Desborough Comprehensive where he wrote comedy for the school magazine and stood as the Labour candidate in the school's 1979 mock election. His father was a book dealer from Galway, Ireland, whilst his mother was active in Oxfam and Amnesty International. He attended classes at the Redroofs Theatre School and played Christopher Robin in the West End at the age of ten, before appearing in the horror film From Beyond the Grave with Diana Dors and Donald Pleasence, and the BBC Children's TV series Jumbo Spencer in 1976. O'Farrell went on to study English and drama at Exeter University.

== Scriptwriting career ==
O'Farrell moved to London in 1985, winning a talent competition at Jongleurs in Battersea, but gave up stand up-comedy in favour of comedy writing. After attending the open meetings for Radio 4's Week Ending he formed a writing partnership with Mark Burton and they soon became lead writers on the show. The duo won the BBC Radio Comedy Writers Bursary, and wrote for a number of radio comedy series, including Little Blighty on the Down, McKay the New and, with Pete Sinclair, A Look Back at the Nineties and Look Back at the Future, in which O'Farrell also performed. The latter series won a British Comedy Award, a Gold Sony Radio Academy Award and a Premios Ondas.

Burton and O'Farrell were commissioned for Spitting Image in 1988 and the following year became two of the lead writers for the show, where they remained for 10 series. O'Farrell is credited with the idea of making John Major permanently grey. They also wrote for Clive Anderson Talks Back, Nick Hancock on Room 101, Murder Most Horrid, and co-wrote some of the "Heads to Heads" for Alas Smith and Jones. In 1993, they left Spitting Image and became the first writers credited for the scripted parts of Have I Got News for You. Again for Hat Trick Productions, they wrote the BBC1 sitcom The Peter Principle starring Jim Broadbent. They also contributed to the screenplay of the Aardman film Chicken Run. It was announced in April 2018 that O'Farrell was co-writing a sequel to Chicken Run.

O’Farrell co-wrote the book for the original stage musical Something Rotten!, which opened on Broadway in April 2015, and for which he was nominated for a Tony Award for Best Book of a Musical with Karey Kirkpatrick as well as a Drama Desk Award and an Outer Circle Critics Award. The show ran for nearly two years on Broadway before going on tour across the United States. It was announced in August 2018 that the same team had been commissioned to write a stage musical of the film Mrs. Doubtfire for Broadway. The stage musical, also titled Mrs. Doubtfire premiered at the 5th Avenue Theatre in Seattle, Washington and opened on Broadway at the Stephen Sondheim Theater in December 2021. It opened at Manchester Opera House in September 2022 and transferred to the Shaftesbury Theatre, in London's West End in May 2023. On 2 October 2023, it was announced that John O'Farrell had written a musical based around Live Aid which was to have its world premiere at The Old Vic in London on 13 February 2024, following previews from 26 January, running until 30 March. The production was directed by Luke Shepard and produced with Bob Geldof and Band Aid's permission. Ten per cent of ticket prices were donated to the Band Aid Trust for their continuing work in Africa.

== Literary career ==
In 1998, O'Farrell published Things Can Only Get Better: Eighteen Miserable Years in the Life of a Labour Supporter. The book became a number-one best-seller, and was nominated for the George Orwell Award and the Channel 4 Political Awards. The popularity of the book led O'Farrell to be invited to address the 1999 Labour Party conference. The memoir was adapted for BBC Radio 4 starring Jack Dee and Doon Mackichan. In September 2010, it was listed by The Economist as Britain's third best-selling political memoir since 1998, after books by Barack Obama and Bill Clinton.

In 1999, O'Farrell began a weekly satirical column in The Independent, soon switching to The Guardian where he remained until 2005. Three collections of his columns have been published; Global Village Idiot, I Blame the Scapegoats and I Have A Bream.

In 2000, O'Farrell published his first novel, The Best a Man Can Get, which was the best-selling debut novel in 2002 and eventually sold half a million copies. It was dramatised for BBC Radio 4 starring Mark Heap and Tamsin Greig. The novel was later optioned by Paramount Pictures. Two further novels followed, This Is Your Life and May Contain Nuts, the latter of which was nominated for the Bollinger Everyman Wodehouse Prize and adapted for ITV by his former co-writer Mark Burton and starred Shirley Henderson and Darren Boyd.

In 2007, he returned to non-fiction with the publication of An Utterly Impartial History of Britain, or 2000 Years of Upper Class Idiots in Charge which was BBC Radio 4's Book of the Week and went on to sell over 250,000 copies. This was followed in October 2009 by An Utterly Exasperated History of Modern Britain, or Sixty Years of Making the Same Stupid Mistakes as Always.

His fourth novel, The Man Who Forgot His Wife, was published in March 2012 and was nominated for the Bollinger Wodehouse Award for comic fiction.

O'Farrell has contributed short stories and non-fiction pieces to a number of charity collections: Nick Hornby's Speaking with the Angel, Magic, Mums, Dads and Being British edited by Gordon Brown. He also contributed a story for The Anniversary, a collection of short stories published as part of the Quick Reads Initiative.

In November 2015, he published his fifth novel There's Only Two David Beckhams described as a football fantasy set at the Qatar World Cup in 2022, which earned him his third nomination for the Wodehouse Award.

In September 2017, he published Things Can Only Get Worse? Twenty Confusing Years in the Life of a Labour Supporter – the sequel to his first political memoir, picking up where the original left off, from the New Labour landslide of 1997 following the journey over two decades up to Brexit, the election of Donald Trump and Theresa May's snap election of 2017. The memoir was shortlisted for the 2017 Parliamentary Book Awards for "Best book by a non-Parliamentarian" and was adapted for serialisation on BBC Radio 4. In March 2024, he published his sixth novel Family Politics, described by Alistair Campbell as "the funniest book about politics I have ever read".

O'Farrell has sold over 1 million books in the UK, and his novels have been translated into over 30 languages, including a Japanese manga edition of The Best a Man Can Get.

== Broadcasting ==
O'Farrell has appeared on such programmes as Newsnight Review, Question Time, Grumpy Old Men. and Have I Got News for You, the only guest previously to have worked on the show's production team. He has written and presented a number of TV and radio documentaries such as Losing My Maidenhead and Paranoid Parenting for BBC1, and Dreaming of Toad Hall, Turn Over Your Papers Now and The Grand Masquerade for Radio 4. After O'Farrell's radio programme The Grand Masquerade on the Kit Williams 1979 treasure hunt book, the golden hare resurfaced, 20 years after it had disappeared.

In 2013, he was chosen by BBC Radio 4's Woman's Hour as the man to put the feminist case against the launch of a new Men's Rights Party. He appeared in Pointless Celebrities in 2016 and 2019 and captained the Exeter Alumni team on University Challenge in December 2012. In January 2025 he was a contestant on Celebrity Mastermind. Other TV appearances and radio broadcasts, include Crime Team, What the Papers Say, The News Quiz, Heresy, Quote Unquote, The Wright Stuff, The Daily Politics, What the Dickens, The 11 O'Clock Show, We've Been Here Before, Clive Anderson's Chat Room and Loose Ends. In January 2020, he teamed up with comedian Angela Barnes to create a new podcast called 'We Are History' which looks at funny, quirky or interesting stories from British and world history.

== Internet ==
In September 2006, O'Farrell launched Britain's first daily news satire website, NewsBiscuit, to create a new outlet for British comedy on the internet. The site also develops new writing using a submissions board where readers can rate each other's material and suggest rewrites or edits. A collection of some of the best stories was published in 2008 as Isle of Wight to Get Ceefax. A number of the writers have gone on to write for BBC Radio or publish books after developing their material on NewsBiscuit. In June 2021, he announced on Twitter that he was giving the site to the team of editors who had effectively been running the site for the previous few years.

== Politics ==
For many years O'Farrell has been a member of the Labour Party. He stood as a paper candidate for Labour in his home town of Maidenhead (the constituency of now former prime minister Theresa May) during the 2001 general election, which was the subject of the BBC documentary Losing My Maidenhead. During the 2005 general election his comic emails to Labour members raised hundreds of thousands of pounds for the party's election campaign. In April 2007, he conducted the first ever interview of a serving prime minister on the internet when he spoke to Tony Blair. He has written jokes for prime ministers Blair and Gordon Brown, as well as other senior Labour figures.

He successfully campaigned for a new state secondary school to be opened in Lambeth, the Lambeth Academy, and became the chair of governors from its opening in 2004 until 2012. He also sat on the board of the United Learning Trust, and is an outspoken supporter of state education. In September 2012, he became Writer in Residence at Burlington Danes Academy in northwest London through the literacy charity First Story.

In February 2013, O'Farrell was selected as the Labour candidate in the Eastleigh by-election which was caused by the resignation of Chris Huhne. He became the target of a campaign by the Daily Mail and other Conservative-supporting newspapers who used extracts or jokes from O'Farrell's books to claim that he was unsuitable for office, as David Cameron attempted to embarrass the Labour leader Ed Miliband by reading out extracts of Things Can Only Get Better during Prime Minister's Question Time. O'Farrell slightly increased Labour's share of the vote, but finished fourth. He announced that he was not intending to stand for Parliament in 2015. On the death of Margaret Thatcher, O'Farrell led calls for Labour supporters to put their hatred behind them, and to donate to those who suffered under her rule. His political and education campaigns are chronicled in his memoir Things Can Only Get Worse.

== Personal life ==
O'Farrell is married with two grown-up children, who both attended Lambeth Academy. He and his family live in Clapham in South London and holiday in West Cork. He holds British and Irish passports. O'Farrell met his wife Jackie when she worked in BBC Radio Comedy. She was the production assistant who had to sit on stage beside Humphrey Lyttelton during I'm Sorry I Haven't a Clue, and O'Farrell joked "I married the lovely Samantha!" He does much of his writing at the London Library and is an official ambassador for the library.

He supports Fulham F.C. and revealed in the club fanzine that the characters in each of his novels are named after players from a particular Fulham team.

== Bibliography ==
=== Fiction ===
- The Best a Man Can Get (2000) (2002, Broadway Books, ISBN 0-7679-0714-0) (2001, Black Swan, ISBN 0-552-99844-3) (2001, Broadway Books, ISBN 0-7679-0713-2) (2000, Doubleday, ISBN 0-385-60084-4)
- This Is Your Life (2002) (2004, Grove Press, ISBN 0-8021-4134-X) (2003, Black Swan, ISBN 0-552-99849-4) (2002, Doubleday, ISBN 0-385-60098-4)
- May Contain Nuts (2 May 2005) (2005, Doubleday, ISBN 0-385-60608-7)
- The Man Who Forgot His Wife (16 March 2012) (2012, Doubleday, ISBN 978-0-385-60610-3 (11 October 2012) Black Swan ISBN 978-0-552-77163-4
- A History of Capitalism According to the Jubilee Line (2013, Penguin, ISBN 978-1-846-14634-3)
- There's Only Two David Beckhams (2015, Black Swan, ISBN 978-1-784-16139-2)
- Family Politics (2024, Doubleday, ISBN 978-0-8575-2977-0)

=== Non-fiction ===
- Things Can Only Get Better: Eighteen Miserable Years in the Life of a Labour Supporter, 1979–1997 (1998) (1998, Doubleday, ISBN 0-385-41059-X) (1999, Black Swan, ISBN 0-552-99803-6)
- Global Village Idiot (2001) (2004, Grove Press, ISBN 0-8021-4038-6) (2002, Corgi, ISBN 0-552-99964-4) (2001, Doubleday, ISBN 0-385-60293-6)
- I Blame the Scapegoats (2003) (2004, Black Swan, ISBN 0-552-77194-5) (2003, Doubleday, ISBN 0-385-60674-5)
- I Have a Bream (February 2007) (2007, Doubleday, ISBN 0-385-61088-2)
- An Utterly Impartial History of Britain – Or 2000 Years of Upper Class Idiots in Charge (22 October 2007) (2007, Doubleday, ISBN 978-0-385-61198-5)
- An Utterly Exasperated History of Modern Britain: or Sixty Years of Making the Same Stupid Mistakes as Always (22 October 2009) (2009, Doubleday, ISBN 0-385-61622-8)
- Things Can Only Get Worse?: Twenty Confusing Years in the Life of a Labour Supporter (2017, Doubleday, ISBN 978-0-857-52474-4)
