= Page to Screen =

- Genre: Documentary
- Starring: Peter Gallagher
- Country of origin: United States
- Original language: English
- No. of seasons: 1
- No. of episodes: 12

Production
- Running time: 46 minutes
- Production company: Kralyevich Productions

Original release
- Network: Bravo
- Release: October 28, 2002 – May 15, 2005

Page to Screen is an American documentary television series hosted by Peter Gallagher, and narrated by David Hibbard. The series premiered October 28, 2002 on Bravo. Page to Screen explores the process of translating novels into films.

== Episodes ==
No.	Title	Original release date
1	"The Silence of the Lambs"	October 28, 2002
2	"Jaws"	November 4, 2002
3	"Get Shorty"	November 11, 2002
4	"The English Patient"	November 18, 2002
5	"Primary Colors"	November 25, 2002
6	"L.A. Confidential"	December 2, 2002
7	"The Lord of the Rings"	December 9, 2002
8	"Road to Perdition"	February 17, 2003
9	"The Cider House Rules"	February 24, 2003
10	"Dances with Wolves"	March 3, 2003
11	"Field of Dreams"	March 10, 2003
12	"Lord of the Rings: Two Towers"	May 15, 2005

== Reception ==
Laura Miller of The New York Times called it "one of the most literate documentary series around".
