= Chaplin (2006 musical) =

Chaplin: The Musical
- Broadway promotional poster
- Music: Christopher Curtis
- Lyrics: Christopher Curtis
- Book: Christopher Curtis; Thomas Meehan
- Productions: 2006 New York Musical Theatre Festival; 2010 La Jolla; 2012 Broadway

Chaplin: The Musical, formerly titled Limelight: The Story of Charlie Chaplin, is a musical with music and lyrics by Christopher Curtis and book by Curtis and Thomas Meehan. The show is based on the life of Charlie Chaplin. The musical, which started at the New York Musical Theatre Festival in 2006, debuted at the La Jolla Playhouse in 2010, and then premiered on Broadway in 2012.

== Productions ==
=== English-language productions ===
The musical originally ran at the New York Musical Theatre Festival in 2006.

The musical was next produced at the La Jolla Playhouse, San Diego, California, from September 19, 2010, to October 17, 2010. Direction was by Warren Carlyle and Michael Unger, with scenic design by Alexander Dodge, costume design by Linda Cho, lighting design by Paul Gallo, projection design by Zachary Borovay, and sound design by Jon Weston. The music director was Bryan Perri and the orchestrator was Douglas Besterman. The cast featured Rob McClure (Charlie Chaplin), Ashley Brown (Oona), LJ Benet (Young Sydney), Jenn Colella (Hedda Hopper), Eddie Korbich (Karno), Brooke Sunny Moriber (Mildred), Ron Orbach (Mr. Chaplin), Roland Rusinek (Alf), Jake Evan Schwencke (Young Charlie/Jackie), and Matthew Scott (Sydney). The cast also included Aaron Acosta, Courtney Corey, Matthew Patrick Davis, Justin Michael Duval, Sara Edwards, Ben Liebert, Alyssa Marie, Jennifer Noble, Kürt Norby, Carly Nykanen, Jessica Reiner-Harris, and Kirsten Scott.

The musical premiered on Broadway at the Ethel Barrymore Theatre on August 21, 2012, in previews and officially on September 10, 2012, with direction and choreography by Warren Carlyle. Scenic design is by Beowulf Boritt, costume design by Amy Clark and Martin Pakledinaz, lighting design by Ken Billington, and projection design by Jon Driscoll. The cast features Rob McClure as Chaplin, Jim Borstelmann as Alf Reeves, Jenn Colella as Hedda Hopper, Erin Mackey as Oona O'Neill, Michael McCormick as Sennett/ McGranery/Emcee, Christiane Noll as Hannah Chaplin, Zachary Unger as Young Charlie/Jackie and Wayne Alan Wilcox as Sydney Chaplin. The musical closed on January 6, 2013, after 24 previews and 136 performances.

Chaplin! received its first regional production in the United States in Henderson, Kentucky. Produced by Brilliantly Different Productions, the show featured direction by J. Farley Norman, choreography by Alexa Callaham, music direction, technical direction, and scenic design by Collin Mayes, and costume design by Colleen Ohler. The production ran for three performances, August 5–7, 2016, and featured a cast of 17 performers, all of whom were under the age of 25. In honor of the production, August 1–7, 2016 was declared "Chaplin the Musical Week" by the City of Henderson.

Chaplin received its first High School production in the United States in Albuquerque, New Mexico. It was produced by The Albuquerque Academy, and performed at the Simms Center for the Performing Arts.

=== Other languages ===
A Russian production of Chaplin premiered on September 13, 2013, and closed on December 30, 2015, at the Musical Comedy Theatre in St. Petersburg. Starring Yevgeniy Zaitsev as Chaplin, this Russian-language replica production featured lyrics translated by Constantine Rubinsky. The show won three awards out of the four nominations it received at the 2015 Golden Mask: Yevgeniy Zaitsev for best actor in a musical/operetta, Maria Lagatskaya for best actress in a musical/operetta, and the musical itself for best musical/operetta.

A non-replica Brazilian production made major changes to the set and costume designs of the original Broadway production. It featured a new script and 7 new songs. The show premiered in Brazil in 2015 and the run was extended 5 times.

A Dutch Production played in Belgium and in the Netherlands with Nordin de Moor as Charlie Chaplin.

Directed by Stanislav Moša, a non-replica version premiered in the Czech Republic at the City Theatre Brno in January 2017.

The Israel production of Chaplin is a collaboration of Haifa Theater and Tel Aviv Theater and premiered in July 2019.

== Cast ==
Character	La Jolla (2010)	Broadway (2012)
Charlie Chaplin	Rob McClure	Rob McClure
Hannah Chaplin	Janet Metz	Christiane Noll
Young Charlie Chaplin / Jackie Coogan	Jake Schwencke	Zachary Unger
Sydney Chaplin	Matthew Scott	Wayne Alan Wilcox
Alf Reeves	Roland Rusinek	Jim Borstelmann
Mack Sennett	Ron Orbach	Michael McCormick
Charlie Chaplin Sr.	William Youmans	Michael McCormick
Hedda Hopper	Jenn Colella	Jenn Colella
Oona O'Neill	Ashley Brown	Erin Mackey

== Musical numbers ==
The musical numbers from the 2016/2018 new version are as follows:

Act 1

- "Look At All the People" – Hannah Chaplin
- "What'cha Gonna Do?" – Hannah Chaplin, Young Charlie Chaplin and Ensemble
- "Far From London" – Charlie Chaplin
- "Vaudeville-Dream" - Fred Karno, Charlie Chaplin, Sydney Chaplin and Ensemble
- "Sennett Song" - Mack Sennett
- "Something Funny" - Charlie Chaplin
- "Tramp Shuffle Part 1" – Charlie Chaplin, Mack Sennett and Usher
- "Tramp Shuffle Part 2" – Reporters, Charlie Chaplin, Usher and Ensemble
- "The Look-a-Like Contest" – Charlie Chaplin and Ensemble
- "Life Can Be Like the Movies" – Charlie Chaplin, Sydney Chaplin, Mildred Harris and Ensemble
- "Life Can Be Like the Movies (Reprise)" - Charlie Chaplin

Act 2

- "Just Another Day in Hollywood" – Charlie Chaplin, Hedda Hopper and Ensemble
- "The Life That You Wished For" – Charlie Chaplin
- "(When It) All Falls Down" – Hedda Hopper
- "Man of All Countries" – Hedda Hopper and McGranery
- "What Only Love Can See" – Oona O'Neill
- "My Brother's Keeper" - Sydney Chaplin
- "The Exile" – Hedda Hopper, McGranery and Ensemble
- "Where Are All the People?" – Charlie Chaplin
- "What Only Love Can See (Reprise)" – Charlie Chaplin
- "This Man" – Full Company
- "Tramp Discovery (Reprise)" – Full Company

== Reception ==
In its review of the La Jolla production, the Los Angeles Times reviewer wrote: "The songs sauté this simplistic summary in a light and lemony schmaltz... The most that can be said is that the cast is marshaled efficiently and the clichés are greeted with a tip of Chaplin's bowler and a clown's forgiving smile... the schematic production... offers up Chaplin's early years as an explanation for everything but his notorious penchant for underage women... The production moves swiftly on Alexander Dodge’s versatile set that is at its lively best when Zachary Borovay’s projections usher us back to the cinematic past... The score hurtles us along with sufficient cheer and generic good will." The Variety reviewer wrote: "The enormous career of film legend Charles Chaplin has resisted numerous chronicling efforts... The latest casualty is "Limelight," a La Jolla Playhouse collaboration between freshman tunesmith Christopher Curtis and vet librettist Thomas Meehan ... that has its moments but falls into the usual trap of trying to cover too much ground. In the process, the tuner turns glib and superficial."

== Awards and nominations ==
Year	Award	Category	Nominee	Result
2013	Tony Award	Best Leading Actor in a Musical	Rob McClure	Nominated
2013	Drama Desk Award	Outstanding Featured Actress in a Musical	Christiane Noll	Nominated
2013	Drama Desk Award	Outstanding Costume Design	Amy Clark and Martin Pakledinaz	Nominated
2013	Drama Desk Award	Outstanding Sound Design in a Musical	Drew Levy and Scott Lehrer	Won
2013	Drama Desk Award	Outstanding Lighting Design	Ken Killington	Nominated
2013	Drama Desk Award	Outstanding Orchestrations	Larry Hochman	Nominated
2013	Drama Desk Award	Outstanding Projection	Jon Driscoll	Nominated
2013	Outer Critics Circle Award	Outstanding New Broadway Musical		Nominated
2013	Outer Critics Circle Award	Outstanding Book of a Musical	Thomas Meehan and Christopher Curtis	Nominated
2013	Outer Critics Circle Award	Outstanding New Score	Christopher Curtis	Nominated
2013	Outer Critics Circle Award	Outstanding Actor in a Musical	Rob McClure	Nominated
2013	Outer Critics Circle Award	Outstanding Director of a Musical	Warren Carlyle	Nominated
2013	Outer Critics Circle Award	Outstanding Choreographer	Warren Carlyle	Nominated
2013	Outer Critics Circle Award	Outstanding Costume Design	Amy Clark and Martin Pakledinaz	Nominated
2013	Outer Critics Circle Award	Outstanding Lighting Design	Ken Billington	Nominated
2013	Astaire Awards	Outstanding Choreographer in a Broadway Show	Warren Carlyle	Nominated
2013	Astaire Awards	Outstanding Male Dancer in a Broadway Show	Rob McClure	Nominated
2013	Theatre World Award	Theatre World Award	Rob McClure	Won
