= A Look Back at the Nineties =

British comedy radio series

- Home station: BBC Radio 4
- Hosted by: Brian Perkins
- Written by: Mark Burton; John O'Farrell; Pete Sinclair
- Original release: 1993
- No. of episodes: 5

A Look Back at the Nineties is a British comedy radio series first broadcast on BBC Radio 4 in 1993. Presented by Brian Perkins, the 5 episodes were a spoof look back at the years 1995 to 1999 from the standpoint of New Year's Eve 1999. Each 30 minute episode covered one year.

== Production ==
The writers were Mark Burton, John O'Farrell and Pete Sinclair, who also appeared performing various impersonations. Other appearances included Rory Bremner, Steve Coogan, Jack Dee, Chris Barrie, Kate Robbins and Griff Rhys Jones.

== Legacy ==
The programme won several awards including the Sony Gold for comedy. A second series was broadcast in 1994 under the title A Look Back at the Future, looking back at the years 2001, 2005, 2010, 2021, 2025 and 2099 from the standpoint of New Year's Eve 2099.
