= NewsBiscuit =

British satirical news website

- Available in: English
- Owner: John O’Farrell
- Editor: Wrenfoe
- Website: www.newsbiscuit.com
- Commercial: Yes
- Launched: 2006
- Current status: Active

NewsBiscuit is a British satirical news website. It was founded in September 2006 by John O'Farrell to create a new outlet for British humour on the internet by a group consisting mainly of comedy writers including Pete Sinclair, Maz Evans, Ivor Baddiel and Wrenfoe.

== Content ==
Each day the site publishes 'front page' articles and shorter 'News in Brief' stories, with a range of headline tickers. All articles are available free-to-view in its archives. The site also develops new writing using a submissions board where readers can rate each other's material and suggest rewrites or edits. These user submissions are rated by other subscribers and the most popular are reworked for the article boards. Alternative punch lines are also encouraged on the site's submissions board.

The articles and features range from satirical takes on current affairs, to various silly and bizarre ideas. On its LaughLines blog, The New York Times declared that NewsBiscuit was the British version of the Onion.

There is a Writer of the Month competition, anyone can participate in. A number of writers who cut their teeth on NewsBiscuit have gone on to write for radio, TV and film or have had novels published.

== Adaptations ==
Since 2021. NewsBiscuit has had its own podcast. In June 2008, the BBC recorded a "NewsBiscuit" pilot for transmission on BBC Radio 4 later in the year. It starred John O'Farrell as the host of fictional radio station NewsBiscuit Dot.Com, and Anna Crilly as its co-presenter. It was, according to O'Farrell, an opportunity for new writers and actors to show their talent.

Also in 2008 a book featuring many of the stories featured on the website was produced, called Isle of Wight to Get Ceefax: And Other Groundbreaking Stories from Newsbiscuit. In 2020 they published '15 Years of Typos' - a collection of their previous work. In 2021 they are scheduled to release another book 'Five Go Dobbing In Their Neighbours'.

== Books ==
Isle of Wight to Get Ceefax (2008 annual), 15 Years of Typos (collection), Five Go Dobbing In Their Neighbours (2021 annual), Earth to be Recycled (2022 annual), Lego to replace Bitcoins (collection)

== Current Editors ==
Throngsman (publisher), Chris F (rota editor), Chipchase, Kit Caboodle, SteveB, David H, TechGuy, Deceangli, BangingOnAgain, Modelmaker, KatieWritesStuff, Dominic_mcg, Oshaughnessy, Lockjaw, StewartBarclay & Wrenfoe

== See also ==
- List of satirical magazines
- List of satirical news websites
- List of satirical television news programs
