= Kevin McCollum =

American theatrical producer

- Born: Honolulu, Hawaii, U.S.
- Education: University of Cincinnati (BFA); University of Southern California (MFA)
- Occupation: Broadway Producer

Kevin McCollum is an American theatrical booking executive and producer of musical theater and plays, many on Broadway. During a producing career spanning over twenty-five years, McCollum has received three Tony Awards for Best Musical for In the Heights, Avenue Q, and Rent.

== Early life and education ==
McCollum was born in Hawaii where he attended the Punahou School. McCollum left to live with his aunt in Illinois after his mother died in 1976 and graduated Deerfield High School in Deerfield, Illinois. McCollum graduated from the University of Cincinnati College-Conservatory of Music in 1984. He earned his master's degree in film producing from the Peter Stark program at the University of Southern California. In 1995, he received the Robert Whitehead Award for Outstanding Commercial Theatre Producing.

In 1997, he married actress Lynnette Perry, who originated the role of Evelyn Nesbit in the musical Ragtime. They have two children. He was previously married to Tony Award winning actress Michele Pawk from 1992-1995.

== Career ==
McCollum formerly served as the president and CEO of the Ordway Center for the Performing Arts, where he was appointed in 1995

McCollum co-founded The Booking Group, which has represented more than 18 Tony Award-winning plays and musicals since its inception. He also co-founded The Producing Office with Jeffrey Seller in 1996.

Through a career that has spanned over twenty-five years in the theatre industry, McCollum has received three Tony Awards for Best Musical for In the Heights (2008), Avenue Q (2004), and Rent (1996). Other producing credits include Motown the Musical (Broadway and tour), The Drowsy Chaperone (five 2006 Tony Awards), Baz Luhrmann's La Bohème (two 2002 Tony Awards), the hit revival of West Side Story (2009), Bengal Tiger at the Baghdad Zoo (2011), and [title of show] (2008).

McCollum was co-producer of the musical Rent in 1996, winner of that year's Tony Awards for Best Musical, Best Book, Best Score and Best Featured Actor. It also won the Pulitzer Prize for Drama, making it only the fifth musical to ever win both the Pulitzer and the Tony. It also won six Drama Desk Awards, including Best Musical. In 2005 he served as executive producer for the movie version of Rent.

== Productions and accolades ==
- TBD The Devil Wears Prada (musical)
- 2025 Two Strangers (Carry a Cake Across New York)
- 2025 42 Balloons
- 2024 Oh, Mary!, 2 Tony Awards
- 2024 Days of Wine and Roses
- 2024 The Notebook
- 2021 Mrs. Doubtfire
- 2021 Six, 2 Tony Awards
- 2017 The Play That Goes Wrong, 1 Tony Award
- 2014 Something Rotten!, 10 Tony Award nominations, 9 Drama Desk nominations
- 2014 Hand to God, 5 Tony Award nominations
- 2013 Motown: The Musical, 4 Tony Award nominations, Broadway, London's West End, Broadway return (July 2016) and American National Tour companies
- 2011 Bengal Tiger at the Baghdad Zoo, 3 Tony Award nominations, 2 Drama Desk Awards
- 2010 Blind Date, Denver Drama Desk Award, Canadian Comedy Award, Dora Award, Betty Mitchel Award, by Rebecca Northan
- 2009 Irving Berlin's White Christmas
- 2009 Ragtime, 6 Tony Award nominations, 1 Drama Desk Award
- 2008 [title of show], 1 Tony Award Nomination
- 2008 In the Heights, 5 Tony Awards, Pulitzer Nomination Drama
- 2006 High Fidelity, 1 Tony Award Nomination
- 2006 The Drowsy Chaperone, 5 Tony Awards, 7 Drama Desk Awards
- 2003 Avenue Q, 3 Tony Awards, 5 Drama Desk Awards
- 2002 La Bohème, 3 Tony Awards, 3 Drama Desk Awards
- 2002 Private Lives, 3 Tony Awards, 3 Drama Desk Awards
- 2001 45 Seconds from Broadway
- 1998 De La Guarda
- 1996 Rent, 4 Tony Awards, 6 Drama Desk Awards, Pulitzer Prize Winner for Drama
- 1994 What's Wrong With This Picture?
- 1994 The Rise and Fall of Little Voice
- 1994 Twilight: Los Angeles 1992, 2 Tony Award nominations, 3 Drama Desk nominations
- 1994 Damn Yankees, 4 Tony Award nominations, 3 Drama Desk nominations

In 2011, McCollum founded Alchemation, a theatre and media company under McCollum's leadership. Productions under the Alchemation banner include Motown the Musical, Something Rotten!, Hand to God and the third season of theatrical web-series Submissions Only. In the summer of 2013, McCollum entered a joint venture with 20th Century Fox to develop titles from the Fox catalogue into stage properties.

In 2005, McCollum was invited to give the commencement address for the graduating class at University of Cincinnati. Effective August 2015, McCollum was appointed to the position of distinguished visiting professor at Cincinnati College-Conservatory of Music, a role that will continue for three years and will include work with faculty and administrators to develop a new musical theatre incubator program at CCM.

== Filmography ==
Year	Title	Producer	Executive Producer	Notes
1995	Jeffrey	No	Yes	
2005	Rent	No	Yes	
2021	In the Heights	No	Yes	
2021	West Side Story	Yes	No	
2025	Lost & Found in Cleveland	No	Yes	
