= Randi Mayem Singer =

American screenwriter

- Born: Randi Allison Mayem; Palos Verdes, California, United States
- Education: University of California, Berkeley
- Occupations: Screenwriter, producer, showrunner
- Years active: 1987–present
- Spouse: Rich Singer (divorced)
- Children: 2

Randi Mayem Singer is an American screenwriter, producer and showrunner best known for writing the screenplay to the 20th Century Fox blockbuster comedy Mrs. Doubtfire starring Robin Williams and Sally Field.

== Professional career ==
Randi Mayem Singer earned her undergraduate degree in political science at the University of California, Berkeley, before pursuing a career in broadcast journalism. Before selling her first script, Singer worked as a news reporter for KMEL San Francisco and as a news anchor for LA radio stations KRLA, KRTH and KFI, using the pseudonym Randi Allison.

While working at KFI, Singer took a screenwriting course at UCLA and began her first screenplay, a quirky romantic comedy called A 22¢ Romance. That script won the inaugural UCLA Diane Thomas Screenwriting Award in 1987, a competition judged by such Hollywood luminaries as Steven Spielberg, James L. Brooks, Michael Douglas, and Robert Zemeckis. A 22¢ Romance sold in a bidding war to Orion Pictures, and, although the script has never been produced, it was listed in the Los Angeles Times' “'The Best' Still On Paper” article in 1992.

Due to the buzz from that script, Twentieth Century Fox tapped Singer to write the screen adaptation of children's novel Alias Madame Doubtfire by Anne Fine. Released in 1993, Mrs. Doubtfire grossed $441 million worldwide, earned an Academy Award for Best Makeup, Golden Globe Award for Best Motion Picture – Musical or Comedy, and placed 67th in the American Film Institute's list of the 100 funniest movies of the last century, AFI's 100 Years...100 Laughs.

Randi Mayem Singer continues to work in both television and film. Other credits include creating and executive producing the sitcom Hudson Street (1995), creating and executive producing the comedic drama TV series Jack & Jill (1999–2001) for The WB, and co-writing the Fox comedy the 2010 film Tooth Fairy, starring Dwayne Johnson, Julie Andrews and Billy Crystal.

Singer is currently writing Disney's upcoming fantasy/comedy Wish List, set to star Reese Witherspoon with Paul Feig directing, as well as the movie version of I Dream of Jeannie for Sony Pictures.

Singer also frequently works as an uncredited “script doctor,” reworking and polishing movie scripts prior to production. She has taught screenwriting for UCLA's graduate screenwriting program and has guest lectured at USC's School of Cinematic Arts, Writers Boot Camp and AFI.

== Screenwriting credits ==
=== Films ===
- Mrs. Doubtfire (1993)
- Tooth Fairy (2010)
- Alvin and the Chipmunks: The Road Chip (2015)

=== Television ===
- Hudson Street (1995–1996)
- Jack & Jill (1999–2001)
- Why Women Kill (2019)
- Mad About You (2019)
