= All Along the Watchtower (TV series) =

- Genre: Sitcom
- Starring: Chris Lang; Roger Blake; Felix Bell; Tony Roper; Zoë Eeles
- Country of origin: United Kingdom
- Original language: English
- No. of series: 1
- No. of episodes: 6

Production
- Running time: 30 minutes

Original release
- Network: BBC One
- Release: 28 February – 11 April 1999

All Along the Watchtower is a British sitcom that aired on BBC One in 1999, about an RAF site in Scotland, it was written by Pete Sinclair and Trevelyan Evans.

== Cast ==
- Chris Lang – Flight Lieutenant Simon Harrison
- Roger Blake – Wing Commander Hilary Campbell-Stokes
- Felix Bell – Airman Tench
- Tony Roper – Iain Guthrie
- Zoë Eeles – Eilidh Guthrie
- Tom Watson – Douggie Maclaggan
- Georgie Glen – Mrs Mulvey

== Plot ==
The series focuses on Flight Lieutenant Harrison, a young up-and-coming RAF officer, whose job is to survey and then recommend RAF stations for closure. The latest on the list is RAF Auchnacluchnie, Nuclear Command Bunker No. K553/44FS, a massive concrete Cold War facility and airstrip, which looms over the isolated Scottish fishing village of Auchnacluchnie. Far from being staffed by the 300 crew he expects, he is horrified to find the site is actually occupied only by the eccentric, obtuse and war-ready Wing-Commander Campbell-Stokes and his gauche junior Airman Tench. All the other staff have been siphoned off over the years and never been replaced, resulting in RAF Auchnacluchnie receiving the full quota of supplies and budget for its supposed population. Campbell-Stokes and Tench have been left to eat from 100 pint tins of baked beans, make tea from 100,000 bag boxes of tea-bags, and keep ready for a war that will never come.

The startling state of affairs is considered just as bad by the local villagers, who see the site as an English establishment foisted upon them. Harrison decides to file a report recommending the site's closure, but meanwhile becomes smitten with Eilidh, the pub landlord's beautiful daughter. She single-handedly runs the local school while her boyfriend, the impressively muscular and unseen Hamish, is away working on an oil rig. Alongside his romantic longings, Harrison realises that closing the site will have a profound impact on the village's school (which only stays open because Eilidh pretends she cares for the children of the 300 site staff). Falsifying his report to London, he is dismayed to find it has not only been accepted but also that he has been posted to the station permanently. Campbell-Stokes and Tench quickly accept him into the fold.

== Episodes ==
No.	Title	Directed by	Written by	Original release date
1	"Back to Front"	Lissa Evans	Trevelyan Evans and Pete Sinclair	28 February 1999
Flt Lt Harrison is forced to decide what to do about the defunct, but still occupied, RAF Auchnacluchnie, while Wing-Commander Campbell-Stokes attempts to censor the RAF site from civilian postcards.
2	"Wet Wet Wet"	Lissa Evans	Trevelyan Evans and Pete Sinclair	7 March 1999
Airman Tench is in love with the TV weather-girl, but the weather, according to Campbell-Stokes, is top-secret and shouldn't even be talked about, which causes some trouble for the pub's lottery and beer garden. Meanwhile, Harrison attempts to win money betting on the weather by falsifying the station's weather reports to the Met Office, and the school sports day proves to be somewhat of a damp squib.
3	"Keeping the Peace"	Lissa Evans	Trevelyan Evans and Pete Sinclair	14 March 1999
Auchnacluchnie is voted one of the quietest places in the UK, gaining itself '4 ears' in the Michelin Guide. This boon for tourism would be good, if not for the site's new North Korean-made siren.
4	"One Flew into the Cuckoo's Nest"	Lissa Evans	Trevelyan Evans and Pete Sinclair	21 March 1999
An osprey nest in one of the radar-dishes mechanisms causes consternation and cat-hunting.
5	"Wish You Weren't Here"	Lissa Evans	Trevelyan Evans and Pete Sinclair	28 March 1999
Re-decorating the pub proves to be somewhat more of a chore than it should be.
6	"The Fallout Zone"	Lissa Evans	Trevelyan Evans and Pete Sinclair	11 April 1999
A Russian fighter plane is incoming on RAF Auchnacluchnie, the last line of defence against the total destruction of Great Britain.
