= Something Rotten! =

Musical that premiered on Broadway in 2015

- 2015 Broadway Playbill
- Music: Karey Kirkpatrick; Wayne Kirkpatrick
- Lyrics: Karey Kirkpatrick; Wayne Kirkpatrick
- Book: Karey Kirkpatrick; John O'Farrell
- Setting: 1595, South London
- Premiere: April 22, 2015: St. James Theatre
- Productions: 2015 Broadway; 2017–2019 US tour

Something Rotten! is a musical comedy with a book by John O'Farrell and Karey Kirkpatrick and music and lyrics by Karey and Wayne Kirkpatrick. Set in 1595, the story follows the Bottom brothers, Nick and Nigel, who struggle to find success in the theatrical world as they compete with the wild popularity of their contemporary William Shakespeare.

Something Rotten! opened on Broadway at the St. James Theatre on April 22, 2015, where it played for 708 performances. It was nominated for ten Tony Awards, including Best Musical, and won one for Best Featured Actor in a Musical (Christian Borle). Tours and international productions have followed.

== Background ==
The musical began with an idea that brothers Karey and Wayne Kirkpatrick had had since the 1990s. They finally joined with John O'Farrell to write several songs and presented those songs and a treatment to the producer Kevin McCollum in 2010. The team then joined with Casey Nicholaw, who brought in several of the actors, resulting in the workshop in 2014.

Something Rotten! was expected to have a pre-Broadway tryout at the 5th Avenue Theatre, Seattle, Washington, in April 2015. However, when a Broadway theatre became available, Kevin McCollum decided to open the show without the Seattle tryout. "David Armstrong, artistic director of 5th Avenue Theater, said ... that after the positive buzz surrounding the musical's workshop in October [2014], he and Mr. McCollum began discussing the possibility of the show bypassing Seattle in favor of Broadway." The developmental lab took place in New York City in October 2014 with Casey Nicholaw as director and choreographer.

== Productions ==
=== Broadway (2015–2017) ===
Something Rotten! began previews on Broadway at the St. James Theatre on March 23, 2015, and officially opened on April 22, starring Christian Borle as William Shakespeare, Brian d'Arcy James as Nick Bottom, John Cariani as Nigel Bottom, Heidi Blickenstaff as Bea Bottom and Brad Oscar as Thomas Nostradamus. It was directed and choreographed by Casey Nicholaw, with the sets designed by Scott Pask, costumes by Gregg Barnes and lighting by Jeff Croiter. The production closed on January 1, 2017 after 742 performances. It was nominated for ten Tony Awards, including Best Musical, and won one (for Borle as Best Featured Actor in a Musical).

=== US national tours (2017–2019) ===
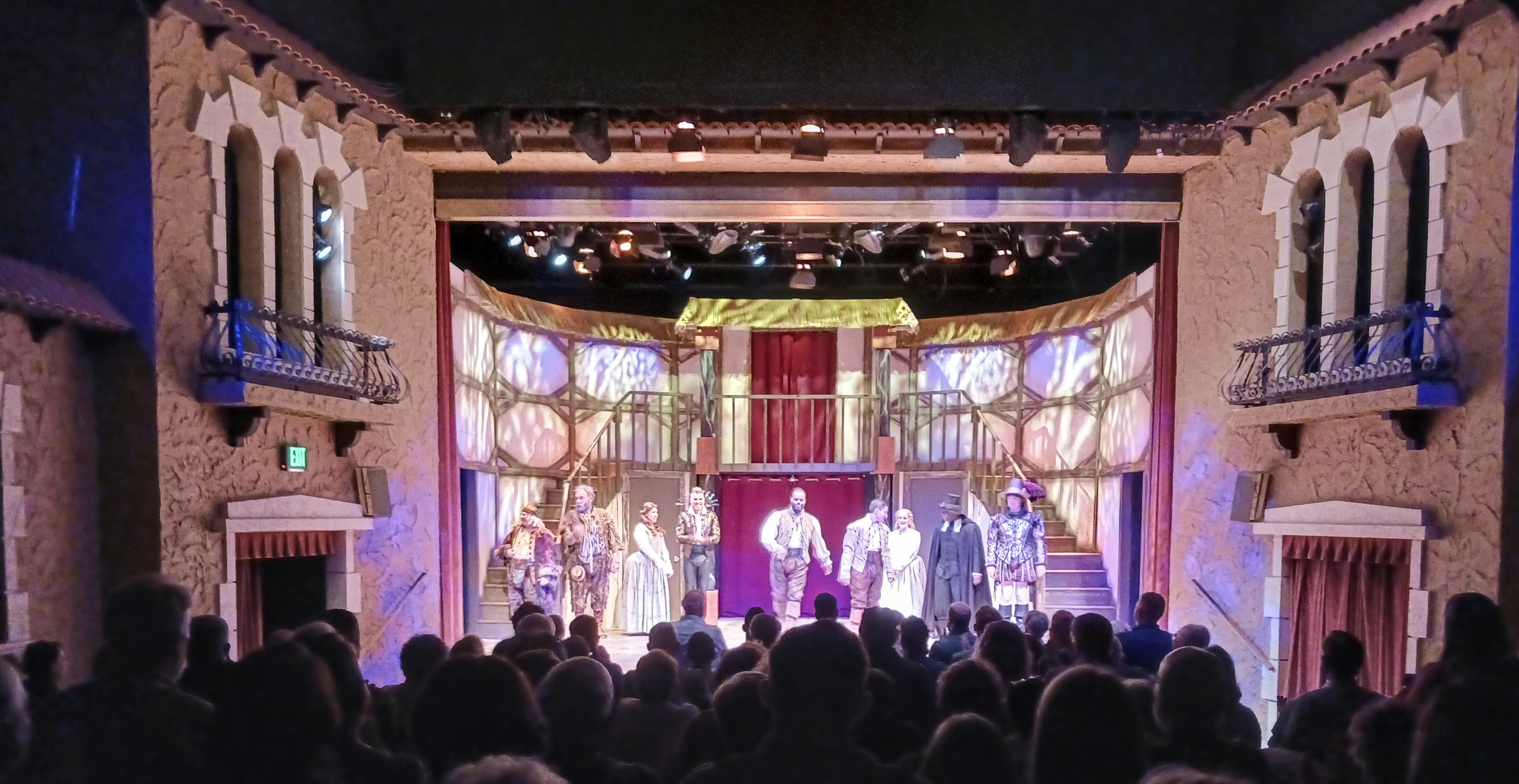
A 2023 production of Something Rotten! in Winter Garden, Florida

The show launched a US national tour with previews at Proctor's Theatre in Schenectady, New York on January 10, 2017, before officially opening at the Boston Opera House on January 17. The tour cast featured Rob McClure (Nick Bottom), Adam Pascal (Shakespeare) and Josh Grisetti (Nigel Bottom).

The show also launched a Non-Equity national tour beginning on September 19, 2018 at the RiverCenter for the Performing Arts in Columbus, Georgia. The tour starred Matthew Janisse (Nick Bottom), Matthew Baker (Shakespeare), and Richard Spitaletta (Nigel Bottom) and was staged by Steve Bebout (associate director of the original Broadway production). In June 2019, the show played a short run of June 9–30 at the Chungmu Art Center Grand Theater in Seoul, South Korea, marking the final destination on the tour.

=== International productions ===
A Swedish-language production ran from November 8, 2018 to March 3, 2019 at the Wermland Opera in Karlstad, Sweden, directed by Markus Virta. The translation was by Calle Norlén. A South Korean production in Korean played in late 2020, at the Chungmu Art Center Grand Theater, though some of the performances were cancelled due to the COVID-19 pandemic. A Czech-language production played from June 19 to 23, 2021, from September 2021 to June 2022, and on May 22, 2023, at Nová Scéna, produced by J. K. Tyl Theatre, in Plzeň, Czech Republic. The translation was by Pavel Bár and the director, Lumír Olšovský.

Another production in Swedish ran at Åbo Svenska Teater in Turku, Finland during the 2023–2024 season. A production in Germany played from November 7, 2023 to January 14, 2024, at The English Theatre Frankfurt, directed and choreographed by Ewan Jones. An Austrian production, the first German-language production of "Something Rotten!" (the earlier production in Frankfurt, Germany was in English), premiered on November 16, 2024, at the Landestheater Linz with Gernot Romic as Nick Bottom and Christian Fröhlich as Shakespeare. The production swapped the sexes of several minor characters: Lord Clapham was Lady Clapham (Alexandra-Yoana Alexandrova) and Nostradamus was Nancy Nostradamus (Daniela Dett).

=== Stratford Festival (2024) ===
A production at the Canadian Stratford Festival began previews on April 16, 2024, and opened on May 28 at the Festival Theatre, directed by Donna Feore. The production closed in November 2024. The production was revived for the 2026 season at the Festival Theatre with Feore again directing and choreographing.

=== West End concert (2024) ===
A concert staging played at Theatre Royal, Drury Lane, in London's West End on August 5 and 6, 2024. Jason Manford starred as Nick opposite Richard Fleeshman as the Bard, Gary Wilmot as Nigel, Evelyn Hoskins as Portia and Marisha Wallace as Bea. It was directed by Tim Jackson.

=== Manchester (2026) ===
A production at the Manchester Opera House runs from 16 June to 19 July 2026, with Manford, Fleeshman and Wallace reprising their concert roles, Cassian Hackforth as Nigel, Carla Dixon-Hernandez as Portia and Jackson returning as director.

== Synopsis ==
=== Act I ===
The Minstrel welcomes everyone ("Welcome to the Renaissance"). Nick Bottom runs a theatre troupe with his brother Nigel. They are rehearsing their upcoming play, Richard II, when Lord Clapham, a patron of the troupe, announces that Shakespeare is doing Richard II. The news outrages Nick, as Shakespeare has already done Richard III, and the thought of going backwards seems absurd to him. Lord Clapham tells the brothers he is stopping their funds unless they have another play by the next morning, sending Nick into a rant: "God, I Hate Shakespeare".

On the way home, Nick encounters Shylock the Jew who wants to help fund the troupe, but Nick rejects this as it is illegal to employ a Jew. Nick and his wife Bea are saving for a better life, and when Nick tries to open the Money Box, Bea pulls it away, instead offering to help them by working, but Nick is adamant ("Right Hand Man"). Despite Nick's arguments, Bea goes out to do jobs that Nick claims are for men. Nick reveals that he hates Shakespeare because he is jealous of Shakespeare's success ("God, I Hate Shakespeare" (reprise)). He seeks a way to top Shakespeare and steals from the Money Box to see a soothsayer named Thomas Nostradamus (the nephew of Nostradamus). Nick asks him what the next big thing in theatre will be, and Nostradamus says that it will be "a musical", where the speaking stops, and the story is told through songs. Nick finds this ridiculous but quickly warms up to the idea ("A Musical").

Nigel has just met Portia, the daughter of Brother Jeremiah, and they immediately fall in love. Nick tells him that he shouldn't pursue her because she is a Puritan. Nick soon tells Nigel about the musical idea but does not tell him about seeing Nostradamus. Nigel wants to musicalize "The Brothers from Cornwall", the story of how they came to England, but Nick says it has to be bigger and decides to adapt the Black Death. The troupe performs a song for Lord Clapham ("The Black Death"). Lord Clapham is disgusted and deserts the troupe, and Brother Jeremiah threatens to have Nick executed if he continues with his work.

Nigel tries to write a new play. Portia sneaks out to see him; they discover that they both love poetry ("I Love the Way"). Nigel tells Portia he sent one of his sonnets to Shakespeare for feedback. A messenger arrives with an invitation for Nigel to attend Shakespeare in the Park and an after-party. Nigel takes Portia as his "plus one", and they watch Shakespeare perform ("Will Power").

Bea tells Nick she's pregnant, and he is ecstatic, yet also worried. Shylock also has an invitation to the after-party and tells Nick that Nigel is attending it. Furious at Nigel, Nick goes to the party to tell him off. There, Portia gets drunk, and Shakespeare asks to read Nigel's journal of poems and writings. Nick chastises Shakespeare for trying to steal Nigel's ideas and reprimands Nigel for his naiveté. Brother Jeremiah arrives to find a drunk Portia and once again admonishes Nigel. Desperate and out of options, Nick agrees to let Shylock invest in his play.

Nick goes back to Nostradamus with the remaining money from the Money Box to ask what Shakespeare's new hit is going to be. Nostradamus sees Hamlet but misinterprets it as "Omelette" and sees the protagonist eating a danish pastry rather than being a Danish prince. Nick dreams of a future in which crowds cheer for him and Shakespeare bows down to him ("Bottom's Gonna Be on Top").

=== Act II ===
The Minstrel notes the stresses that the Bottom brothers and Shakespeare face ("Welcome to the Renaissance" (reprise)). Shakespeare laments trying to write hits while managing his fame. A spy tells him that the brothers are trying to steal his upcoming hit. Shakespeare decides to disguise himself as "Toby Belch" and audition for the brothers' troupe to steal the play ("Hard to Be the Bard").

The troupe is rehearsing Omelette: The Musical ("It's Eggs!"). Shylock is their new investor, but they cannot find a title that would make his role legal. Some of the actors wonder why Nostradamus is at their theatre; Nick says that he is an actor. "Toby Belch" arrives and is hired. Shakespeare is surprised to learn that his next hit is supposed to be about eggs.

Nigel sneaks out to London Bridge to see Portia and reads her another poem about his love for her. Portia says that everyone will change their minds about their relationship when they hear Nigel's beautiful sonnets ("We See the Light"). Nigel is not happy with Omelette, believing it won't work. Brother Jeremiah interrupts the lovers and imprisons Portia in a tower for disobeying. Saddened, Nigel is inspired to write a different play that is revealed to be Hamlet. At the theatre, Nigel tells Nick about this, and Shakespeare realizes that this is his next hit and takes advantage of Nick and Nigel's argument to get it ("To Thine Own Self"). Nick is having qualms about Omelette as well but dismisses these doubts when he learns the musical is sold out. Shakespeare steals Nigel's hit under the guise of "improving it". Bea tells Nigel that they should trust Nick because they can always call on him if they need him ("Right Hand Man" (reprise)).

Nick and the troupe prepare for the show ("Something Rotten!"). It opens with a bombastic dance number filled with references to musicals such as The Lion King and The Phantom of the Opera ("Make an Omelette"). Shakespeare removes his disguise and reveals Nick's plot, horrifying Nigel and the troupe.

In court, Nick, Nigel, Nostradamus, and Shylock are on trial and are about to be sentenced to beheading. Bea enters disguised as a lawyer and makes Nick confess that he stole from the Money Box; she tells the judge that beheading him would be redundant because he has already lost his head. She has made a deal with Shakespeare that they will be exiled to America ("To Thine Own Self" (reprise)). She says that they always wanted a new country house, and now they are getting a house in a new country. Portia then arrives, having escaped the tower. She renounces her father's ideals and joins the Bottoms in exile.

The Bottom Family, Portia, Shylock, Nostradamus and their acting troupe find new opportunities in the New World ("Finale"). When they hear about the opening of Shakespeare's new masterpiece, Hamlet, Nostradamus sighs, "I was this close!"

== Music ==
=== Musical numbers ===
Act I

- "Welcome to the Renaissance" – Minstrel and Company
- "God, I Hate Shakespeare" – Nick, Nigel and The Troupe
- "Right Hand Man" – Bea, Nick and Nigel
- "God, I Hate Shakespeare" (reprise) – Nick
- "A Musical" – Nostradamus, Nick and Ensemble
- "The Black Death" – The Troupe
- "I Love the Way" – Portia and Nigel
- "Will Power" – Shakespeare and Ensemble
- "Bottom's Gonna Be on Top" – Nick and Company

Act II

- "Welcome to the Renaissance" (reprise) – Minstrel
- "Hard to Be the Bard" – Shakespeare and Ensemble
- "It's Eggs!" – Nick and The Troupe
- "We See the Light" – Portia, Nigel, Brother Jeremiah, Nick, Ensemble
- "Nigel's Theme" – Nigel
- "To Thine Own Self" – Nigel, Nick, Shakespeare and The Troupe
- "Right Hand Man" (reprise) – Bea
- "Something Rotten!" – The Troupe
- "Make an Omelette" – Nick and Company
- "To Thine Own Self" (reprise) – Nick and Nigel
- "Finale/Welcome to America" – The Company

=== Recording ===
Ghostlight Records released the Original Broadway Cast Album of Something Rotten! on June 2, 2015 in digital music stores and July 17, 2015 on CD.

In the recording, "Something Rotten!" and "Make an Omelette" are combined into one track because of the brevity of the former.

=== Musical references ===
The show includes references to numerous musicals. For example, during the song "A Musical", "Nostradamus and the chorus men don sailor hats, which harkens to several nautical-themed musicals, including South Pacific, Anything Goes, On the Town and Dames at Sea." The TheaterMania reviewer noted that the song "A Musical" "encapsulates the entire book-musical form in six hilarious minutes. It's so chock-full of witty references and energetic dance; it's hard to see how it could be topped." Variety also pointed out that the song "A Musical" "simultaneously celebrates and sends up everything we hold dear about this peculiar art form, from the 'jazzy hands' of Bob Fosse to the synchronized line dancing of the Rockettes."

== Characters and cast ==
The original casts of the major-market productions are as follows:

Character	Broadway	US national tour
Character	2015	2017
Nick Bottom	Brian d'Arcy James	Rob McClure
Nigel Bottom	John Cariani	Josh Grisetti
William Shakespeare	Christian Borle	Adam Pascal
Bea Bottom	Heidi Blickenstaff	Maggie Lakis
Portia	Kate Reinders	Autumn Hurlbert
Thomas Nostradamus	Brad Oscar	Blake Hammond
Brother Jeremiah	Brooks Ashmanskas	Scott Cote
Shylock	Gerry Vichi	Jeff Brooks
Lord Clapham	Peter Bartlett	Joel Newsome
Master of the Justice	Peter Bartlett	Patrick John Moran
Minstrel	Michael James Scott	Nick Rashad Burroughs

=== Notable Broadway replacements ===
- Nick Bottom: Rob McClure
- Nigel Bottom: Josh Grisetti
- William Shakespeare: Will Chase, Adam Pascal
- Bea Bottom: Leslie Kritzer
- Portia: Catherine Brunell
- Lord Clapham/Master of the Justice: Edward Hibbert

== Awards and honors ==
=== Original Broadway production ===
Year	Award	Category	Nominee	Result
2015
2015	Tony Award	Best Musical		Nominated
2015	Tony Award	Best Book of a Musical	Karey Kirkpatrick & John O'Farrell	Nominated
2015	Tony Award	Best Original Score	Karey Kirkpatrick & Wayne Kirkpatrick	Nominated
2015	Tony Award	Best Leading Actor in a Musical	Brian d'Arcy James	Nominated
2015	Tony Award	Best Featured Actor in a Musical	Christian Borle	Won
2015	Tony Award	Best Featured Actor in a Musical	Brad Oscar	Nominated
2015	Tony Award	Best Costume Design of a Musical	Gregg Barnes	Nominated
2015	Tony Award	Best Direction of a Musical	Casey Nicholaw	Nominated
2015	Tony Award	Best Choreography	Casey Nicholaw	Nominated
2015	Tony Award	Best Orchestrations	Larry Hochman	Nominated
2015	Drama Desk Award	Outstanding Musical		Nominated
2015	Drama Desk Award	Outstanding Actor in a Musical	Brian d'Arcy James	Nominated
2015	Drama Desk Award	Outstanding Featured Actor in a Musical	Christian Borle	Won
2015	Drama Desk Award	Outstanding Featured Actor in a Musical	Brad Oscar	Nominated
2015	Drama Desk Award	Outstanding Director of a Musical	Casey Nicholaw	Nominated
2015	Drama Desk Award	Outstanding Choreography	Casey Nicholaw	Nominated
2015	Drama Desk Award	Outstanding Lyrics	Karey & Wayne Kirkpatrick	Nominated
2015	Drama Desk Award	Outstanding Book of a Musical	Karey Kirkpatrick & John O'Farrell	Nominated
2015	Drama Desk Award	Outstanding Orchestrations	Larry Hochman	Nominated
2015	Outer Critics Circle Award	Outstanding New Broadway Musical		Nominated
2015	Outer Critics Circle Award	Outstanding Book of a Musical	Karey Kirkpatrick & John O'Farrell	Nominated
2015	Outer Critics Circle Award	Outstanding New Score	Karey & Wayne Kirkpatrick	Nominated
2015	Outer Critics Circle Award	Outstanding Director of a Musical	Casey Nicholaw	Nominated
2015	Outer Critics Circle Award	Outstanding Choreographer	Casey Nicholaw	Nominated
2015	Outer Critics Circle Award	Outstanding Set Design	Scott Pask	Nominated
2015	Outer Critics Circle Award	Outstanding Costume Design	Gregg Barnes	Nominated
2015	Outer Critics Circle Award	Outstanding Lighting Design	Jeff Croiter	Nominated
2015	Outer Critics Circle Award	Outstanding Actor in a Musical	Christian Borle	Nominated
2015	Outer Critics Circle Award	Outstanding Actor in a Musical	Brian d'Arcy James	Nominated
2015	Outer Critics Circle Award	Outstanding Featured Actor in a Musical	John Cariani	Nominated
2015	Outer Critics Circle Award	Outstanding Featured Actress in a Musical	Heidi Blickenstaff	Nominated
2015	Drama League Award	Outstanding Production of a Broadway or Off-Broadway Musical		Nominated
2015	Drama League Award	Distinguished Performance Award	Christian Borle	Nominated
2015	Drama League Award	Distinguished Performance Award	Brian d'Arcy James	Nominated
2016	Grammy Award	Best Musical Theater Album	Blickenstaff, Borle, Cariani, James, Oscar & Kate Reinders (principal soloists); Kurt Deutsch, K. & W. Kirkpatrick, Lawrence Manchester, Kevin McCollum & Phil Reno (producers); K. & W. Kirkpatrick (composers/lyricists)	Nominated
