= Mrs. Doubtfire =

1993 film by Chris Columbus

- Theatrical release poster
- Directed by: Chris Columbus
- Screenplay by: Randi Mayem Singer; Leslie Dixon
- Based on: Madame Doubtfire by Anne Fine
- Produced by: Mark Radcliffe; Marsha Garces Williams; Robin Williams
- Starring: Robin Williams; Sally Field; Pierce Brosnan; Harvey Fierstein; Robert Prosky
- Cinematography: Donald McAlpine
- Edited by: Raja Gosnell
- Music by: Howard Shore
- Production companies: 20th Century Fox; Blue Wolf Productions
- Distributed by: 20th Century Fox
- Release date: November 24, 1993
- Running time: 125 minutes
- Country: United States
- Language: English
- Budget: $25 million
- Box office: $441.3 million

Mrs. Doubtfire is a 1993 American comedy-drama film directed by Chris Columbus, written by Randi Mayem Singer and Leslie Dixon, based on the 1987 novel Madame Doubtfire, by Anne Fine. The film was produced by Mark Radcliffe, Marsha Garces Williams and her then-husband Robin Williams, who also starred in the lead role. The film co-stars Sally Field, Pierce Brosnan, Harvey Fierstein, and Robert Prosky. It follows a recently divorced voice actor who disguises himself as an elderly female housekeeper in order to spend time with his children.

Mrs. Doubtfire was released in the United States by 20th Century Fox on November 24, 1993. It grossed $441.3 million on a $25 million budget, making it the second-highest-grossing film of 1993. While critical reception was mixed, the film won the Academy Award for Best Makeup, and the Golden Globe Award for Best Motion Picture – Musical or Comedy. Williams was awarded the Golden Globe Award for Best Actor in a Motion Picture – Musical or Comedy.

== Plot ==
Freelance voice actor Daniel Hillard lives in San Francisco and is a devoted father to his three children—fourteen-year-old Lydia, twelve-year-old Chris, and five-year-old Natalie—though his workaholic wife Miranda considers him immature and unreliable. After quitting a job following a disagreement over a morally questionable script, Daniel returns home to throw Chris a chaotic birthday party, despite Miranda's objections due to Chris' declining grades. Miranda arrives home early to break up the party and, in the ensuing argument, tells Daniel she wants a divorce. Due to Daniel's unemployed and homeless status, Miranda is granted sole custody of the children, with Daniel having visitation rights every Saturday; shared custody is contingent upon Daniel finding a steady job and suitable residence within three months.

Daniel secures an apartment and a job as a shipping clerk at a television station. After learning that Miranda is looking to hire a housekeeper, Daniel secretly alters her classified ad form, then calls her using his voice acting skills to pose as a series of undesirable applicants before calling as "Euphegenia Doubtfire" (a surname he derives from a newspaper headline), an elderly British nanny with strong credentials. Impressed, Miranda invites Mrs. Doubtfire for an interview. Daniel's makeup artist brother Frank and Frank's domestic partner Jack help Daniel appear as an old woman through the use of makeup and prosthetics.

Miranda hires Mrs. Doubtfire following a successful interview. The kids initially struggle under her authority, but eventually come around and thrive, while Miranda becomes more easygoing and closer with the kids. Daniel further improves himself as well, becoming more responsible, learning several household skills, and earning Miranda's respect. However, Miranda puts more trust in Mrs. Doubtfire than in Daniel, and cannot bring herself to dismiss her. Miranda also begins dating an old friend, Stu Dunmeyer, much to Daniel's chagrin. One night, after Lydia and Chris discover Daniel standing while urinating, he reveals the truth; they agree to keep his secret so that they can continue spending time with him.

One day, the station's CEO, Jonathan Lundy, sees Daniel playing with props on the set of a recently cancelled children's show. Impressed by his voice acting, humor, and imagination, Lundy invites Daniel to dinner to discuss plans for a new show. The meeting turns out to be at the same place and time as a planned birthday dinner for Miranda, to which Mrs. Doubtfire is invited. Daniel spends the night changing in and out of the Mrs. Doubtfire costume to attend both events. Becoming intoxicated, Daniel accidentally returns to Lundy in costume, but quickly explains himself by claiming that Mrs. Doubtfire is his idea for the new show's host. After learning of Stu's pepper allergy, Daniel sneaks into the kitchen and seasons Stu's jambalaya with powdered cayenne. When Stu begins choking, a guilt-ridden Daniel administers the Heimlich maneuver, accidentally causing the prosthetic mask to slip off and expose his identity. A horrified Miranda leaves with the children.

At their next custody hearing, Daniel points out that he has met the judge's requirements ahead of schedule, then explains that his actions were done out of love for his children and begs to still be allowed to see them. Disturbed by Daniel's behavior, the judge grants Miranda full custody of the children, only granting Daniel supervised visitation rights every Saturday, and suggests that Daniel undergo psychological counseling. Without Mrs. Doubtfire, Miranda and the kids become miserable, acknowledging how much "she" improved their lives. They then discover that Daniel, as Mrs. Doubtfire, is hosting the new children's show Euphegenia's House, which becomes a nationwide hit.

Miranda visits Daniel on set and admits that things were better when he was involved with the family. She arranges joint custody, allowing Daniel to take the children daily after school. As Daniel leaves for the day with the children, Miranda watches an episode of Euphegenia's House in which Mrs. Doubtfire answers a letter from a young girl whose parents recently separated, and assures the girl that no matter what arrangements families have, love will prevail.

== Cast ==
- Robin Williams as Daniel Hillard / Mrs. Doubtfire
- Sally Field as Miranda Hillard
- Pierce Brosnan as Stu Dunmeyer
- Harvey Fierstein as Frank Hillard
- Polly Holliday as Gloria
- Lisa Jakub as Lydia Hillard
- Matthew Lawrence as Chris Hillard
- Mara Wilson as Natalie Hillard
- Robert Prosky as Jonathan Lundy
- Anne Haney as Mrs. Sellner
- Scott Capurro as Jack
- Martin Mull as Justin Gregory
- William Newman as Mr. Sprinkles

== Production ==
=== Casting ===
Warren Beatty was Anne Fine's first choice for the role of Daniel Hillard / Mrs. Doubtfire. Tim Allen was offered the roles of Daniel Hillard and Stu Dunmeyer, but declined both of them. Daniel Stern was another choice for the role of Stu Dunmeyer, but was busy with Rookie of the Year. Chris Columbus originally wanted Catherine O'Hara for the role of Miranda Hillard because of her experience in Home Alone, but O'Hara was busy with The Nightmare Before Christmas. Kirstie Alley was also considered for the role of Miranda Hillard. George Carlin, Gene Wilder and Charles Grodin were considered for the role of Mr. Jonathan Lundy.

=== Filming ===
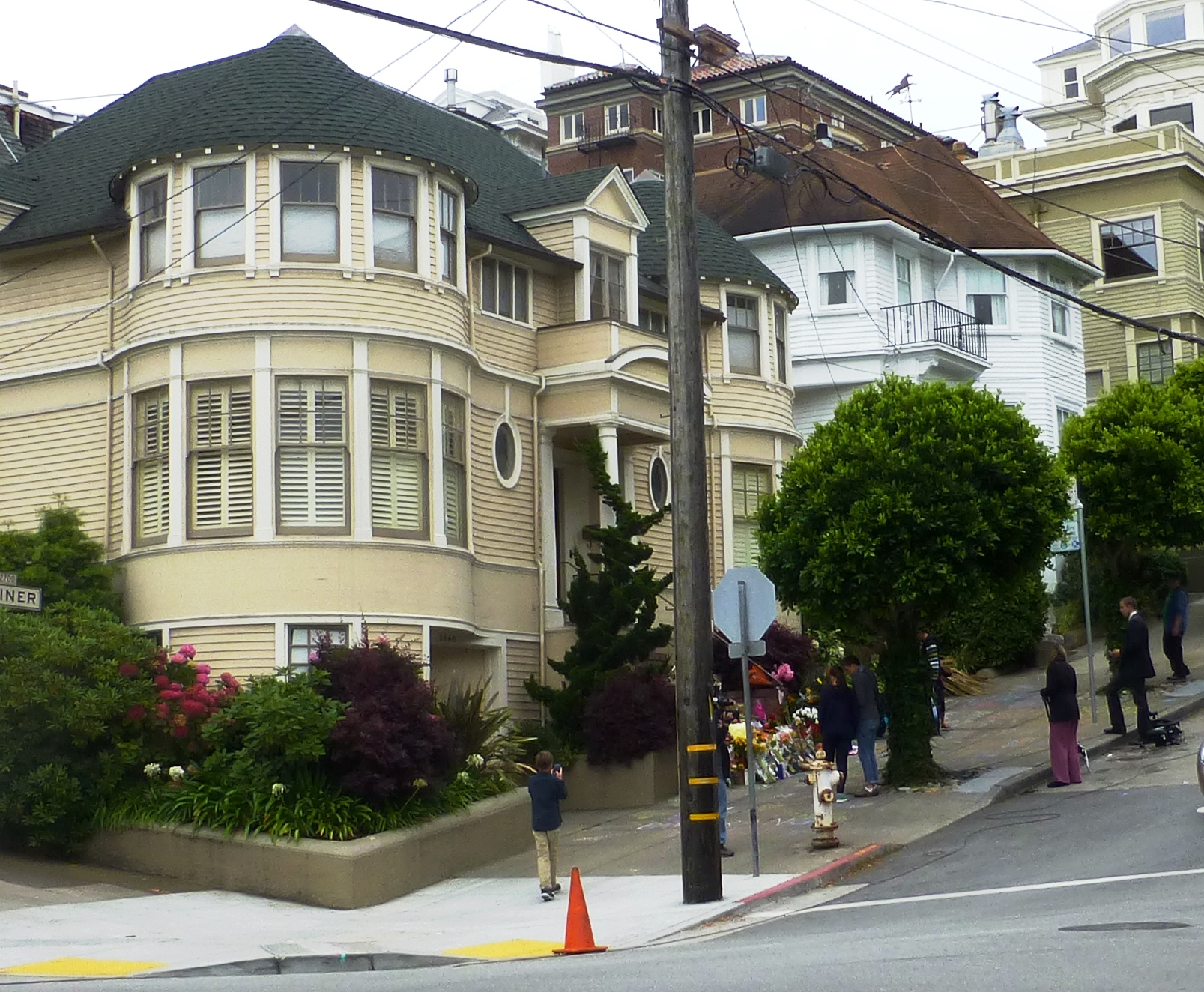
The San Francisco house used for exterior shots of the film, photographed in August 2014, several days after Robin Williams' death; a fan-made tribute to Williams can be seen at its front steps.

Mrs. Doubtfire was filmed in San Francisco in spring 1993. Various locations in the city were used during filming. Parts were filmed at the studios of television station KTVU in Oakland. Street signs for the intersection near the "Painted Lady" home, Steiner, and Broadway, were visible onscreen.

The exact address, 2640 Steiner Street, became a tourist attraction for some time after the film's release. Following Robin Williams' death on August 11, 2014, the house became an impromptu memorial. All interior filming for the home took place in a Bay Area warehouse, converted for soundstage usage. Williams' character, Daniel Hillard, lived upstairs from Danilo Bakery at 516 Green Street; his children attended a school at Filbert and Taylor.

The makeup for Mrs. Doubtfire's appearance took four hours to apply. Williams later recounted how he used to walk through San Francisco dressed in full makeup and costume as Mrs. Euphegenia Doubtfire, and on one occasion, visiting a sex shop to buy a large dildo and other toys. Director Chris Columbus stated in a 2015 interview that they shot with multiple cameras at once, like shooting a documentary, to capture the cast members' reaction to Williams's improvisation. According to Columbus, they ran out of film after shooting too much of Williams' improvisation. The restaurant scene was filmed at Bridges Restaurant & Bar in Danville, California.

The score was composed, orchestrated and conducted by Howard Shore.

The Pudgy and Grunge animated film segment in the opening scene was directed by Chuck Jones. Though only one minute of the cartoon is shown during the film, Jones and his team animated five minutes of footage.

== Release ==
=== Theatrical ===
The film was released in the United States on November 24, 1993, and was rated PG-13.

When the film was released in the United Kingdom in January 1994, it received a certificate of 12, which, at the time, completely refused access to children under age 12 at cinemas (the 12A certificate did not exist until 2002). This resulted in cinemas requesting their local authorities to override the decision of the British Board of Film Classification, after having to turn down disappointed families. In February 1994, The Independent reported that the censors refused to give the film a U or PG certificate, and gave it a 12 instead, which was due to 20th Century Fox refusing to remove three controversial lines. After the film's distributors requested the BBFC to reconsider, a compromise was reached, and the film was rerated PG, with just one of the proposed three cuts implemented, involving the removal of thirteen seconds featuring sexual innuendo (the other two cuts would have removed just some of the innuendo), and it was rereleased in May 1994.

=== Home media ===
Fox Video released the film on VHS in the United States on April 26, 1994, just five months after the film's theatrical release and while the film was still grossing over $1 million a weekend. It would also debut on a THX certified LaserDisc release that same month.

In the United Kingdom, the rated PG version was used in the initial VHS and DVD releases. In November 2012, the distributors resubmitted the original version to the BBFC, and the 12 certificate was reinstated for home video, along with a 12A certificate for cinema release in 2014. On March 4, 2013, the original version was released on Blu-ray and downloads in the United Kingdom.

=== Deleted scenes ===
Over 30 minutes of scenes were omitted from the final cut of the film, some of which were featured in the 2008 DVD release of Mrs. Doubtfire called the "Behind-the-Seams Edition". If the scenes had been included, the film would have run for 157 minutes. These include an entire subplot featuring Daniel's conflict with his nosy neighbor, Gloria Chaney (Polly Holliday), in which, after Daniel dresses as Mrs. Doubtfire, he fools Gloria into killing her flowers by spraying dog urine on them, and a final confrontation in which Gloria sees Daniel in his Mrs. Doubtfire bodycostume but without the face mask. There is also an extended scene at Bridges restaurant. In 2016, three scenes from the 2008 DVD release, which were also included in the 2013 Blu-ray release, gained media attention to much fanfare and praise for Robin Williams. These included a scene in which Daniel and Miranda fight at Lydia's spelling bee competition, and a confrontation scene with Miranda after Daniel's identity is revealed at the restaurant. He recovers and comes back home to the family.

In early 2021, several web articles claimed that there was an NC-17 cut of the film featuring extraordinarily vulgar ad libs by Robin Williams. However, the claim was debunked by director Chris Columbus and star Mara Wilson, with Columbus stating that Williams did film enough outtakes to make an R-rated version, but that an NC-17 rating was absurd. Wilson previously denied the claims of an NC-17 version of the film in 2016 in her memoir, Where Are They Now?: True Stories of Girlhood and Accidental Fame.

== Reception ==
=== Box office ===
Mrs. Doubtfire collected $20.4 million during its three-day opening weekend. Within its first five days of release, it generated a total gross of $27.5 million. Upon opening, it would go on to reach the number one spot at the box office, beating out Addams Family Values and A Perfect World. This would be the last non-Disney film to win the Thanksgiving weekend box office until How the Grinch Stole Christmas in 2000. The film earned $219,195,243 in the United States and Canada, and $222,090,952 in other countries, for a worldwide total of $441,286,195, making it Fox's highest-grossing film internationally at the time, and the highest-grossing cross-dressing film. It became the second-highest-grossing film of 1993, behind Jurassic Park. Box Office Mojo estimates that the film sold over 52.6 million tickets in the US. It had a record opening for Fox in the United Kingdom, with $5.8 million in 6 days (and the third-best in the country, after Jurassic Park and Bram Stoker's Dracula), and went on to gross $30.1 million, a Fox record. It had the second-biggest opening in Italy, behind Jurassic Park, with $2.9 million, and also grossed a record for Fox in Italy, with $15.6 million. It had record openings for Fox in France (with an opening week gross of $4.8 million, and a total of $23 million), Belgium, Hungary and Denmark. It grossed $29.6 million in Germany. The film was number one at the Australian box office and Japanese box office for nine consecutive weeks.

=== Critical reception ===
Mrs. Doubtfire received mixed reviews from critics upon release. At the time of its release, several critics compared Mrs. Doubtfire unfavorably with Some Like It Hot (1959), and others who viewed the film favorably noted its similarity to Tootsie (1982).

On Rotten Tomatoes, Mrs. Doubtfire has a rating of 71%, based on 55 reviews, with an average rating of 5.90/10. The site's critical reception reads: "On paper, Mrs. Doubtfire might seem excessively broad or sentimental, but Robin Williams shines so brightly in the title role that the end result is difficult to resist." On Metacritic, the film holds a score of 53 out of 100, based on 16 critics, indicating "mixed or average reviews". Audiences polled by CinemaScore gave the film an average grade of "A" on a scale of A+ to F.

Roger Ebert of The Chicago Sun-Times gave the film two-and-a-half stars out of a possible four. He questioned if Williams' character could actually conceal his identity in makeup from his ex-wife and children, and also wrote "the film is not as amusing as the premise, and there were long stretches when I'd had quite enough of Mrs. Doubtfire." Ebert also noted comparisons to Tootsie, which he described as "more believable, more intelligent and funnier" while Mrs. Doubtfire was essentially a television sitcom.

=== Accolades ===
Award	Category	Nominee(s)	Result	Ref.
20/20 Awards	Best Make Up/Hair	Greg Cannom, Ve Neill, and Yolanda Toussieng	Won	
Academy Awards	Best Makeup	Greg Cannom, Ve Neill, and Yolanda Toussieng	Won	
American Comedy Awards	Funniest Actor in a Motion Picture (Leading Role)	Robin Williams	Won	
American Comedy Awards	Funniest Supporting Actor in a Motion Picture	Pierce Brosnan	Nominated	
American Comedy Awards	Funniest Supporting Actor in a Motion Picture	Harvey Fierstein	Nominated	
ASCAP Film and Television Music Awards	Top Box Office Films	Howard Shore	Won	
Artios Awards	Outstanding Achievement in Feature Film Casting – Comedy	Jane Jenkins and Janet Hirshenson	Nominated	
Awards Circuit Community Awards	Best Actor in a Leading Role	Robin Williams	Nominated	
Awards Circuit Community Awards	Best Makeup & Hairstyling	Greg Cannom, Ve Neill, and Yolanda Toussieng	Nominated	
British Academy Film Awards	Best Makeup and Hair	Greg Cannom, Ve Neill, and Yolanda Toussieng	Nominated	
Golden Globe Awards	Best Motion Picture – Musical or Comedy		Won	
Golden Globe Awards	Best Actor in a Motion Picture – Musical or Comedy	Robin Williams	Won	
Golden Screen Awards			Won	
Kids' Choice Awards	Favorite Movie Actor	Robin Williams	Won	
MTV Movie Awards	Best Male Performance	Robin Williams	Nominated	
MTV Movie Awards	Best Comedic Performance	Robin Williams	Won	
Nastro d'Argento	Best Male Dubbing	Carlo Valli (for dubbing Robin Williams)	Won	
People's Choice Awards	Favorite Comedy Motion Picture		Won	
People's Choice Awards	Favorite Actor in a Comedy Motion Picture	Robin Williams	Won	
Young Artist Awards	Best Family Motion Picture – Comedy or Musical		Nominated	
Young Artist Awards	Best Performance by a Youth Actor Co-Starring in a Motion Picture	Matthew Lawrence	Nominated	
Young Artist Awards	Best Performance by a Youth Actress Co-Starring in a Motion Picture	Lisa Jakub	Nominated	

In 2000, the American Film Institute placed the film on its 100 Years...100 Laughs list, where it was ranked #67.

== Legacy ==
=== Cast reunions ===
In November 2018, the three sibling cast members (Lisa Jakub, Mara Wilson, and Matthew Lawrence) reunited with Pierce Brosnan for the film's 25th anniversary on Today. They would later reunite in May 2024 for a joint podcast appearance on Lawrence's Brotherly Love podcast.

=== Canceled sequel ===
In 2001, Bonnie Hunt began to develop Mrs. Doubtfire 2. Anne Fine had not written a follow-up to Alias Madame Doubtfire, and writing for the sequel did not begin until 2003. Robin Williams was set to return in disguise as the eponymous Mrs. Doubtfire. Rewriting began in 2006 because Williams was unhappy with the plot in the new script. The film had been anticipated for release in late 2007, but following further script problems, the sequel was scrapped in December 2006.

In 2006, in a Newsday interview, Williams said that the sequel was indefinitely scrapped, stating his reasons:

The script they had just didn't work. The sequel's story involved Daniel as Mrs. Doubtfire moving close to Lydia's college, so he could keep an eye on her.

Also, in December that year, during an interview on BBC Radio 1 by DJ Edith Bowman, Williams said that if it was not going to be done right, then it was not worth doing, and that there would not be a sequel with him in it.

In August 2010, on Alan Carr: Chatty Man, Williams again brought up the topic of a sequel to Mrs. Doubtfire. He blamed the script not being right as the reason why a sequel was not made. He claimed that the script had been written three times and failed, and there was no mention of any ongoing work on the project. Furthermore, in December 2011, during an interview by Moviehole, Williams again stated that the chances of a sequel are "highly unlikely".

In 2011, Williams said:

They could never write it. They kept trying and it doesn't work... because at the end of the first one they reveal who [Mrs. Doubtfire] is. So it ends up being her for five minutes and then she transitions into some old Russian woman. They so far can't crack it.

In 2014, Chris Columbus stated, in turn:

We're talking about a sequel to Mrs. Doubtfire. We've [he and Williams] talked about it, and the studio is interested in it. The thing that fascinates me about a sequel to Mrs. Doubtfire is with most actors who create an iconic character like Mrs. Doubtfire, when you come back and do that character, well, you're twenty years older so, you're not going to look the same. The cool thing with Mrs. Doubtfire is there's a character, there's a woman, who is actually going to look exactly as she did in 1993.

In April 2014, a sequel was announced to be in development at 20th Century Fox. Williams and Columbus were expected to return, and Elf screenwriter David Berenbaum was hired to write the script. Initial reception to the announcement was mixed, with some people fearing that the sequel would revive certain misgivings about the transgender community and set the LGBTQ awareness progress back two and a half decades, especially after an image of the character was used to mock the trans community at a medical insurance coverage reform in 2013. Matthew Lawrence, Lisa Jakub and Pierce Brosnan had expressed interest in reprising their respective characters for the sequel. However, Mara Wilson, who played Natalie Hillard in the original film, expressed no interest in returning for the sequel. Following Williams's death in August 2014, plans for a sequel were put on hold, then again canceled.

In August 2014, shortly after Williams's death, it was revealed that Williams had grown weary working on film sets because it tended to take him away from his family for extended periods of time, and he signed on for the sequel "purely out of necessity". In August 2015, Columbus revealed that the sequel came to be after someone came up with a very interesting idea, and that his conversation with Williams about the subject was the last time he ever talked to the actor. In December 2021, Columbus stated that a sequel was impossible without Robin Williams's involvement. In November 2023, Columbus stated he would be very vocal about it if Disney (who owns the rights to the film following their purchase of 20th Century Fox in 2019) ever made it.

=== Stage adaptation ===
Theatrical producer Kevin McCollum spoke in 2013 about the film's musical prospects, noting that the plot was "tailored for Broadway audiences". Following a 2015 plan going on hiatus, McCollum assembled a different creative team in 2018: Karey and Wayne Kirkpatrick composing the score, with John O'Farrell and Karey Kirkpatrick writing the book, and Tony Award-winner Jerry Zaks directing. The musical, Mrs. Doubtfire, premiered in Seattle at the 5th Avenue Theatre on December 13, 2019. The production transferred to Broadway, with previews beginning March 9, 2020, at the Stephen Sondheim Theatre. All Broadway productions were suspended three days later due to the COVID-19 pandemic. Eventually, Mrs. Doubtfire resumed previews on October 21, 2021, and officially opened on December 5, 2021.

=== Possible documentary film ===
In November 2023, Chris Columbus revealed in an interview with Business Insider commemorating the film's 30th anniversary that a documentary about the making of the film was in development, which would utilize outtakes and behind-the-scenes footage.

== See also ==
- Cross-dressing in film and television
- Avvai Shanmughi, the 1996 Indian Tamil-language film that was inspired by Mrs. Doubtfire
- Chachi 420, the 1997 Indian Hindi-language remake of Avvai Shanmughi
- Fruity Pie, a Taiwanese series that features an actor who cross-dresses as a grandma
- Kauda Bole Alice, the 2000 Sri Lankan Sinhala-language remake
