= Pete Sinclair (writer) =

British radio and television writer

- Occupation: Writer
- Years active: 1986 – present

Pete Sinclair is a writer who has worked on British television and radio series such as All Along the Watchtower, Have I Got News for You, Lead Balloon, and Spitting Image. Much of his writing has been in the genres of comedy and political satire. He created the ITV sitcom Bad Move with Jack Dee in 2017.

== Credits ==
=== Television ===
- Bad Move (2017)
- Power Monkeys (2016)
- Have I Got News for You (2016)
- Ballot Monkeys (2015)
- Newzoids (2015)
- Alexander Armstrong's Big Ask (2013)
- Lead Balloon (2006)
- The Mark Steel Lectures (2006)
- Mike Bassett: Manager (2005)
- My Hero (2003)
- Mr Charity (2001)
- You Only Live Once (2000)
- All Along the Watchtower (1999)
- Never Mind the Buzzcocks (1996)
- Room 101 (1994)
- Clive Anderson Talks Back (1989)
- The Rory Bremner Show (1988)
- Spitting Image (1987)
- Carrott Confidential (1987)
- Now, Something Else (1986)

=== Radio ===
- Loose Ends (1998)
- A Look Back at the Nineties (1993)
- The Mark Steel Solution (1992)
- Unnatural Acts (1987)
