= Rob McClure =

American actor (born 1982)

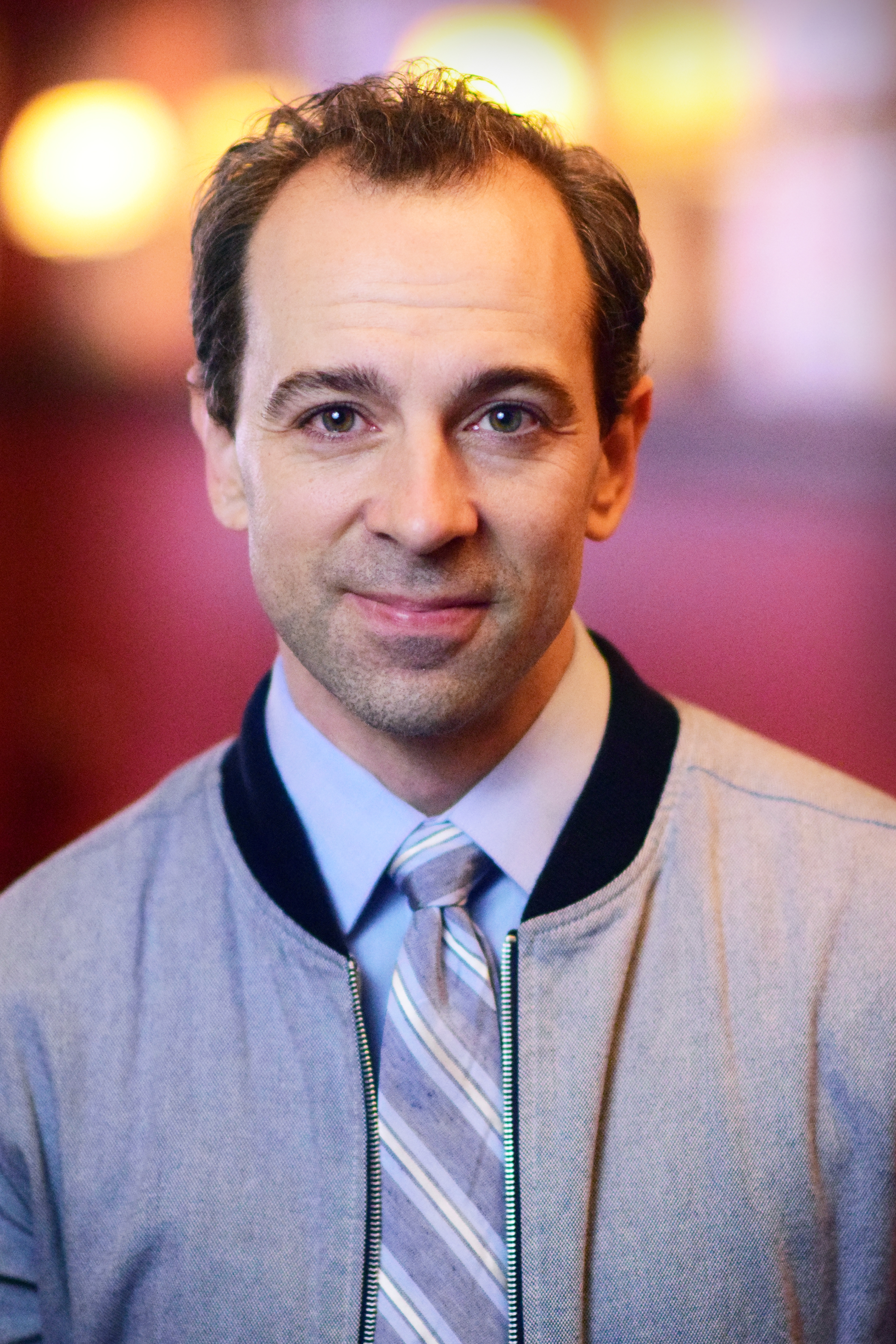
- McClure in 2022
- Born: Robert McClure; June 15, 1982 (age 44); New Milford, New Jersey, U.S.
- Education: Montclair State University (attended)
- Occupations: Actor, singer
- Spouse: Maggie Lakis (m. 2009)
- Children: 1

Robert "Rob" McClure (born June 15, 1982) is an American actor and singer, best known for his work on the Broadway stage.

McClure made his Broadway debut in 2002 as an understudy in I'm Not Rappaport. From 2006 to 2009, he went on to play several roles in Avenue Q, both on Broadway and on the show's national tour. In 2013, he won a Theatre World Award and earned a nomination for the Tony Award for Best Actor in a Musical for his lead performance in the title role of the musical Chaplin. His subsequent Broadway credits include originating principal roles in Honeymoon in Vegas (2015) and Beetlejuice (2019). He has also starred in Noises Off (2016) and Something Rotten! (2016–18). In 2021, McClure originated the lead role of Daniel Hillard in Mrs. Doubtfire, a performance for which he earned his second Tony nomination.

== Education ==
McClure graduated from New Milford High School in New Milford, New Jersey in 2000 and attended Montclair State University, but did not graduate. While a senior in high school, he won the Paper Mill Playhouse Rising Star Award for Outstanding Performance by an Actor in a Leading Role for his performance as Charley in New Milford High School's production of Where's Charley?, which included a scholarship to attend their Summer Musical Theatre Conservatory. He directed musicals at New Milford High School from 2003 to 2006 (including a show that he wrote, The Bagel Factory) while attending Montclair State University.

== Career ==
=== Theatre ===
McClure's first professional acting role was at the Paper Mill Playhouse in Carousel shortly after graduating high school. He appeared in the ensemble of the Paper Mill Playhouse revival of the play I'm Not Rappaport, making his Broadway debut when the production transferred to the Booth Theatre in 2002. He next performed on Broadway in the musical Avenue Q as Nicky and Trekkie Monster in 2006 and in the show's national tour for two years, beginning in 2007, as Princeton and Rod, returning to Broadway in those roles in 2009.

McClure played the title role in the new musical Chaplin in 2010 when it premiered at the La Jolla Playhouse, California, under its former title Limelight: The Story of Charlie Chaplin. He continued in the role when the show transferred to Broadway in 2012. For this performance, he was nominated for the 2013 Tony Award for Best Actor in a Musical. The Newsday reviewer wrote of his performance:

McClure … doesn't just replicate the waddle and pratfalls of Chaplin's little tramp. He doesn't just do a back somersault without spilling a glass of wine or tap dance on roller skates or walk a tightrope. He does all that without apparent effort, but he also has a pungent voice that pings and he embodies more than seven decades of Chaplin's life with a focused, altogether believable mix of gravity and light.

In between these runs, he performed in the New York City Center Encores! staged concert of Where's Charley? in 2011. The New York Times reviewer of Where's Charley? wrote, "McClure scampers to and fro with tireless energy, flouncing in and out of his skirts with comic verve, employing a funny, pinched falsetto when Charley is impersonating his aunt. … Mr. McClure [is] a nimble dancer and terrific singer. He also performed at the Walnut Street Theatre, Philadelphia, in the play Amadeus in 2011 as Mozart. He had previously performed at that theatre in The Producers and Oliver!. He appeared in mid-2013 at The Muny, St. Louis, Missouri in Shrek the Musical as Lord Farquaad, and in Mary Poppins as Bert. The following year, at The Muny, he played Gomez in The Addams Family from July 14, 2014 to July 20.

He starred in the musical Honeymoon in Vegas as Jack Singer at the Paper Mill Playhouse from September through October 2013. McClure continued as Jack in the Broadway production of the musical at the Nederlander Theatre in 2014 and 2015. He returned to Broadway in the role of Tim Allgood in the Roundabout Theatre Company production of Noises Off! from December 2015 to January 2016. From September 2015 to March 2016, McClure appeared as Max in the new Ken Ludwig play A Comedy of Tenors at the Cleveland Playhouse and then at the McCarter Theater in Princeton, New Jersey. He played the role of The Baker in The Muny’s production of Into the Woods.

He next joined the Broadway production of Something Rotten! as Nick Bottom in May 2016. He then played Nick in the US national tour, starting in January 2017, until it closed in May 2018.

In June 2018 McClure appeared in Jerome Robbins' Broadway at The Muny, as The Setter/Emcee. Later in 2018 he created the role of Adam in Beetlejuice, the Musical when it premiered at the National Theatre in Washington, DC. He reprised the role on Broadway in 2019 leaving Beetlejuice in September 2019 to create the title role in the musical Mrs. Doubtfire, which premiered at the 5th Avenue Theatre in Seattle, Washington, with performances in November 2019 - January 2020, to open on Broadway in April. It opened at the Stephen Sondheim Theater in March 2020 but was forced to close after three shows due to the COVID-19 pandemic. It reopened December 5, 2021, and ran until May 29, 2022.

=== Concerts ===
McClure made his solo cabaret concert debut at Feinstein's/54 Below in New York City on July 1, 2016. His act was titled "Smile."

McClure also a member of the Nightmare Before Christmas in Concert during the year of 2020. He played the role of Barrel

=== Television ===
He was cast in the CBS television pilot in 2016 for a series titled Drew, based on the Nancy Drew mystery books; however, the series was not picked up by CBS.

In the 2022 HBO original series Julia, McClure makes a cameo as a young Fred Rogers.

in 2026, McClure had a recurring role in the CBS series Cupertino as the computer AI Bo.

== Personal life ==
He has been married to actress Maggie Lakis since 2009. They met while performing in Grease in 2005. The couple have a daughter, born on December 9, 2018.

== Theatre credits (select) ==
Sources: Playbill Vault and Playbill

Year	Production	Role	Notes
2001	Carousel	Enoch Snow, Jr.	Paper Mill Playhouse
2002	I'm Not Rappaport	Ensemble	Broadway
2006–07	Avenue Q	Various characters	Broadway
2007–09	Avenue Q	Various characters	National tour
2009	Avenue Q	Various characters	Broadway
2010	Chaplin	Charlie Chaplin	La Jolla Playhouse
2011	Little Shop of Horrors	Seymour Krelborn	The Muny
2012–13	Chaplin	Charlie Chaplin	Broadway
2013	Shrek the Musical	Lord Farquaad	The Muny
2013	Mary Poppins	Bert	The Muny
2014	The Addams Family	Gomez Addams	The Muny
2014	Hello, Dolly!	Cornelius Hackl	The Muny
2015	Honeymoon in Vegas	Jack Singer	Broadway
2015	Into the Woods	The Baker	The Muny
2015	Beauty and the Beast	Lumière	The Muny
2016	Noises Off!	Tim Allgood	Broadway
2016–17	Something Rotten!	Nick Bottom	Broadway
2017–18	Something Rotten!	Nick Bottom	National tour
2018	Beetlejuice	Adam Maitland	National Theatre, Washington, DC
2019	Beetlejuice	Adam Maitland	Broadway
2019	Mrs. Doubtfire	Daniel Hillard/Mrs Doubtfire	5th Avenue Theatre, Seattle
2020	Mrs. Doubtfire	Daniel Hillard/Mrs Doubtfire	Broadway
2021–22	Mrs. Doubtfire	Daniel Hillard/Mrs Doubtfire	Broadway
2022	Little Shop of Horrors	Seymour Krelborn	Off-Broadway
2023	Lewberger & The Wizard of Friendship	Keith’s Dad (One night cameo)	Off-Broadway
2023	Spamalot	Prince Herbert/The Historian	Kennedy Center
2023–24	Mrs. Doubtfire	Daniel Hillard/Mrs Doubtfire	National tour
2025	Guys and Dolls	Nathan Detroit	Ogunquit Playhouse
2025	Dear Evan Hansen	Larry Murphy	The Muny
2025	Damn Yankees	Mr. Applegate	Arena Stage
2026	Spare Parts	Professor Coffey	Theatre Row (New York City)

== Video games ==
Year	Title	Role	Notes
2026	Grand Theft Auto VI	The Local Population	

== Awards and nominations ==
Source: Playbill Vault

Year	Award	Category	Work	Result
2013	Tony Award	Best Actor in a Musical	Chaplin	Nominated
2013	Outer Critics Circle	Outstanding Actor in a Musical	Chaplin	Nominated
2013	Theatre World Award		Chaplin	Honoree
2015	Drama League Award	Distinguished Performance	Honeymoon in Vegas	Nominated
2022	Tony Award	Best Actor in a Musical	Mrs. Doubtfire	Nominated
2022	Drama Desk Award	Outstanding Actor in a Musical	Mrs. Doubtfire	Nominated
2022	Drama League Award	Distinguished Performance	Mrs. Doubtfire	Nominated
2022	Outer Critics Circle Award	Outstanding Actor in a Musical	Mrs. Doubtfire	Nominated
