= Karey Kirkpatrick =

American screenwriter, director, and producer

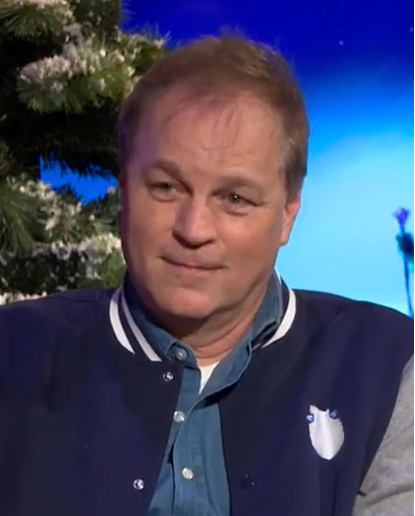
- Kirkpatrick in 2018
- Born: December 14, 1964 (age 61); Monroe, Louisiana, U.S.
- Education: USC School of Cinematic Arts
- Occupations: Screenwriter; director; producer
- Children: 3
- Relatives: Wayne Kirkpatrick (brother)
- Writing career
- Years active: 1990–present

Karey Kirkpatrick (born December 14, 1964) is an American screenwriter, film director, and producer. His films include Chicken Run franchise, The Rescuers Down Under, James and the Giant Peach, Over the Hedge, The Spiderwick Chronicles, Charlotte's Web, and The Hitchhiker's Guide to the Galaxy. He has also directed the films, Over the Hedge, Imagine That starring Eddie Murphy and Smallfoot. Kirkpatrick wrote the English-language screenplays for the American releases of the Studio Ghibli films The Secret World of Arrietty in 2012 and From Up on Poppy Hill in 2013.

His older brother is American songwriter and musician Wayne Kirkpatrick, with whom he wrote the 2015 musical Something Rotten! as well as the 2020 musical Mrs. Doubtfire.

== Life and career ==
Kirkpatrick attended the School of Cinematic Arts at the University of Southern California, graduating in 1988. He began his career as a staff writer at Walt Disney Feature Animation, where he worked for more than three years. During that time, he earned his first screenwriting credit as a co-writer on The Rescuers Down Under. He went to become a freelance screenwriter, and his early writing credits include Honey, We Shrunk Ourselves, James and the Giant Peach, and The Little Vampire. In 1997, Kirkpatrick wrote the screenplay for Aardman's Chicken Run from a story by Peter Lord and Nick Park. Kirkpatrick also wrote the screenplay adaptation of The Hitchhiker's Guide to the Galaxy for Touchstone Pictures and Spyglass Entertainment.

Kirkpatrick had a longstanding relationship with DreamWorks Animation, where he has contributed as a writer or story consultant on The Road to El Dorado and Madagascar. In May 2006, DreamWorks Animation released Over the Hedge, for which Kirkpatrick co-wrote the screenplay and made his directorial debut, sharing directing credits with Tim Johnson. That same year, Kirkpatrick co-wrote the screenplay of the live-action adaptation of E. B. White's classic Charlotte's Web for Paramount Pictures/Walden Media/Nickelodeon Movies. He produced and co-wrote, with partner Chris Poche, the comedy Flakes. He directed the Eddie Murphy dramedy Imagine That for Paramount Pictures.

Kirkpatrick wrote the English-language screenplay for the American releases of the Japanese animated films The Secret World of Arrietty in 2012 and From Up on Poppy Hill in 2013, both of which were produced by Studio Ghibli. The same year, he contributed to the screenplay for Sony Pictures Animation's The Smurfs 2, and was announced as the writer and director of an original comedy film from DreamWorks Animation about a "dim-witted blue-footed booby".

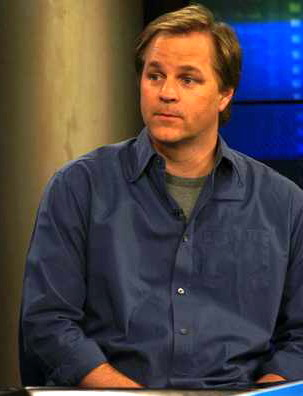
Karey Kirkpatrick in 2006

In 2011, Karey and his brother Wayne began working on the musical Something Rotten!. In 2015, they were nominated for a Tony Award for Best Original Score (Music and/or Lyrics) Written for the Theatre. Karey was also nominated for Best Book of a Musical along with John O'Farrell. They also received a Grammy nomination for "Best Original Cast Recording".

Kirkpatrick wrote and directed the animated musical comedy Smallfoot (2018), which was produced by the Warner Animation Group and animated by Sony Pictures Imageworks. Kirkpatrick, along with brother Wayne, also co-wrote the film's six original songs.

Kirkpatrick also co-wrote the song "Such a Beautiful Day" for the Disney animated film Phineas and Ferb the Movie: Candace Against the Universe for which he received and Emmy Nomination for "Outstanding Original Song for a Preschool, Children's, or Animated Program".

Kirkpatrick and his Chicken Run co-writer John O'Farrell in 2018 were hired to script a sequel film, Chicken Run: Dawn of the Nugget. The film was released on Netflix in 2023.

== Filmography ==
=== Film ===
Year	Title	Director	Writer	Producer	Notes
1990	The Rescuers Down Under	No	Yes	No	Credited as "Animation Screenplay"
1996	James and the Giant Peach	No	Yes	No	
1997	Honey, We Shrunk Ourselves	No	Yes	No	
2000	Chicken Run	No	Yes	No	
2000	The Little Vampire	No	Yes	No	
2005	The Hitchhiker's Guide to the Galaxy	No	Yes	No	
2006	Over the Hedge	Yes	Yes	No	Co-directed with Tim Johnson
2006	Charlotte's Web	No	Yes	No	
2007	Flakes	No	Yes	Yes	
2008	The Spiderwick Chronicles	No	Yes	Yes	
2009	Imagine That	Yes	No	No	Also music department (producer, writer, performer)
2011	From Up on Poppy Hill	No	Yes	No	US adaptation
2012	The Secret World of Arrietty	No	Yes	No	US adaptation; Also additional voices
2013	The Smurfs 2	No	Yes	No	
2018	Smallfoot	Yes	Yes	Executive	Also lyricist
2023	Chicken Run: Dawn of the Nugget	No	Yes	Executive	

=== Television ===
Year	Title	Notes
1995	Timon and Pumbaa	Writer: Episode "Okay Bayou?"
2015	The Tonight Show Starring Jimmy Fallon	Queen Latifah/Sam Rockwell/Something Rotten! (Uncredited)

Other credits

Year	Title	Role
2000	The Road to El Dorado	Additional dialogue
2004	Laws of Attraction	Additional script
2005	Madagascar	Creative consultant
2006	Hammy's Boomerang Adventure	Short; creative consultant
2015	69th Tony Awards	Lyricist: "A Musical"
2015	Strange Magic	Special thanks
2017	The True Don Quixote	Executive producer
2017	71st Tony Awards	Lyricist: Opening Number
2018	Early Man	Story consultant
2019	The Addams Family	Special thanks
2019	A Shaun the Sheep Movie: Farmageddon	Special thanks
2020	Phineas and Ferb the Movie: Candace Against the Universe	Songwriter: "Such a Beautiful Day"
