= Madame Doubtfire =

1987 novel by Anne Fine

- First edition
- Author: Anne Fine
- Original title: Madame Doubtfire
- Cover artist: Bob Lea
- Language: English
- Genre: Young adult fiction
- Publisher: Hamish Hamilton
- Publication date: 1987
- Publication place: United Kingdom
- Media type: Print (Hardback & paperback)
- Pages: 175pp
- ISBN: 0-14-037355-1

Madame Doubtfire, known as Alias Madame Doubtfire in the United States, is a 1987 novel written by English author Anne Fine for teenage and young adult audiences. The novel is about a father who poses as a female nanny to care for his estranged children after a divorce.

Well received upon its publication in the UK, it was shortlisted for awards, including the Guardian Children's Fiction Prize and Whitbread Children's Book Award.

In November 1993, six years following its publication, the novel was adapted into Mrs. Doubtfire, a film starring Robin Williams and Sally Field as the parents.

== Synopsis ==
Daniel and Miranda Hilliard are separated, and Miranda is the primary caretaker for their three children: Lydia, Christopher and Natalie. Miranda is a successful businesswoman, while Daniel is a neurotic, out-of-work actor moonlighting as a nude model for an amateur art class. Miranda restricts the amount of time Daniel is allowed to be with the children, and justifies her decision by telling Daniel he is irresponsible, a bad father, and a poor role model.

When Miranda decides to hire a nanny, Daniel learns about it and uses his acting experience to pose as "Iphigenia Doubtfire", an elderly Scottish former housekeeper. Lydia and Natalie immediately know who Doubtfire really is, with Lydia explaining to Christopher, but Miranda is oblivious. Daniel uses his disguise to spend time with the children while trying to prove to himself that he can be a good parent. Though his cooking and cleaning skills are terrible, he proves to be an excellent gardener and a willing disciplinarian.

Daniel's art class needs to find a place to convene, and Miranda grudgingly offers the use of her home. After Miranda discovers Daniel's secret, they have a terrible argument in front of the children, culminating in the three kids announcing that they hate both of their parents. Realizing how bad things have got, Miranda finally resolves the situation by giving Daniel a steady job as her gardener so that he can continue to be around their children.

== Awards and nominations ==
- 1987: Guardian Children's Fiction Prize (shortlist)
- 1987: Observer Teenage Fiction Prize (shortlist)
- 1987: Whitbread Children's Book Award (shortlist)

== Film adaptation ==
The American feature film adaptation was produced by 20th Century Fox (with a budget of $25 million) and was released on 24 November 1993. The adaptation was directed by Chris Columbus, and written by Randi Mayem Singer and Leslie Dixon. Robin Williams stars as the title character, and Sally Field plays his wife Miranda.

In the film, Daniel's disguise includes a prosthetic mask, which is so convincing that no one in his family recognizes him at first. Greg Cannom, Ve Neill, and Yolanda Toussieng received the Academy Award for Best Makeup for creating Mrs. Doubtfire. Grossing $441.3 million worldwide, it became the second-highest-grossing film of 1993, behind only Jurassic Park.

The film also served as the basis for the 1995 Filipino comedy-drama mockbuster Wanted: Perfect Father starring Dolphy, with some scenes directly lifted from Mrs. Doubtfire.

== Origin of the "Doubtfire" name ==
Author Anne Fine based the name of her novel on a 1970s-era second-hand store, "Madame Doubtfire", located at the corner of Howe Street and South East Circus Place in Edinburgh. The shop was owned by Annabella Coutts, who named her shop after her first husband, Arthur Cyril Doubtfire.

== See also ==
- Avvai Shanmugi
- Chachi 420
