= 2023 Laurence Olivier Awards =

Annual UK theatre awards

- Date: 2 April 2023
- Location: Royal Albert Hall
- Hosted by: Hannah Waddingham
- Most wins: My Neighbour Totoro (6)
- Most nominations: My Neighbour Totoro (9)

Television/radio coverage
- Network: ITV (television); Magic (radio)

The 2023 Laurence Olivier Awards were held on 2 April 2023 at the Royal Albert Hall and hosted by Hannah Waddingham.

== Event calendar ==
- 12 October 2022: Ceremony date set for 2 April 2023 and venue confirmed as the Royal Albert Hall.
- 17 January: Hannah Waddingham announced as ceremony host.
- 28 February: Nominations announcement by Gabrielle Brooks and Amber Davies.
- 24 March: Special Recognition Award recipients announced as Derek Jacobi and Arlene Phillips.
- 2 April: Award ceremony held

== Presenters ==
- Matthew Bourne
- Darcey Bussell
- Liz Carr
- Es Devlin
- Helen George
- Meera Syal
- Dita Von Teese
- Eddie Izzard and Sheridan Smith – presented Best Revival
- Sheila Atim and Aimee Lou Wood – presented Best Actor and Best Actress
- Cush Jumbo – presented Best New Play
- Mark Strong – presented Best Director
- Anne Reid – presented the Lifetime Achievement Award to Derek Jacobi
- Ronan Keating and Harriet Scott – presented Best Musical Revival
- Sindhu Vee and Tim Minchin – presented Best Actor and Actress in a Supporting Role in a Musical
- Lea Salonga – presented Best Actress in a Musical
- Luke Evans – presented Best Actor in a Musical
- Golda Rosheuvel and Self Esteem – presented Best New Musical
- Marisha Wallace and Hannah Waddingham – presented the Special Recognition Award to Arlene Phillips

== Performances ==
- Hannah Waddingham – Opening number
- Beverley Knight, Lizzie Bea, Lesley Joseph and the cast of Sister Act – "Raise Your Voice"
- Peter Caulfield, Katie Brayben and cast of Tammy Faye – "Light of the World"
- Marisha Wallace, Arthur Darvill, Anoushka Lucas and the cast of Oklahoma! – "I Cain't Say No"/"Oklahoma"
- The cast of Newsies – "Carrying the Banner"/"Brooklyn's Here"/"Seize the Day"
- Shanay Holmes with the Arts Education Choir – "Seasons of Love" (In Memoriam)
- The cast of The Book of Mormon – "Hello"
- Miri Mesika with Alon Abutbul – "Omar Sharif"
- Jay Perry, Sharon Rose, Beverley Knight, Kelly Agbowu and the cast of Sylvia – "March, Women, March"
- Maimuna Memon, Bobbie Little, Samuel Jordan and the cast of Standing at the Sky's Edge – "Standing at the Sky's Edge"
- Darren Bennett, Jocasta Almgill, Olivia Moore, Dan Partridge and the cast of Grease – "Grease"/"Greased Lightnin'"/"Born to Hand Jive"/"You're the One That I Want"/"Summer Nights"

== Winners and nominees ==
The nominations were announced in 26 categories on 28 February 2023.

Best New Play	Best New Musical
Prima Facie by Suzie Miller – Harold Pinter Theatre; For Black Boys Who Have Considered Suicide When the Hue Gets Too Heavy by Ryan Calais Cameron – Jerwood Downstairs, Royal Court; Patriots by Peter Morgan – Almeida Theatre; To Kill a Mockingbird by Aaron Sorkin (based on original text by Harper Lee) – Gielgud Theatre	Standing at the Sky's Edge – National Theatre Olivier; The Band's Visit – Donmar Warehouse; Sylvia – Old Vic; Tammy Faye – Almeida Theatre
Best Revival	Best Musical Revival
A Streetcar Named Desire – Almeida Theatre; The Crucible – National Theatre Olivier; Good – Harold Pinter Theatre; Jerusalem – Apollo Theatre	Oklahoma – Young Vic; My Fair Lady – London Coliseum; Sister Act – Eventim Apollo; South Pacific – Sadler's Wells
Best Entertainment or Comedy Play	Best Family Show
My Neighbour Totoro by Tom Morton-Smith (based on original text by Hayao Miyazaki) – Barbican Theatre; Jack and the Beanstalk – London Palladium; My Son's a Queer (But What Can You Do?) by Rob Madge – Garrick Theatre and Ambassadors Theatre; One Woman Show by Liz Kingsman – Ambassadors Theatre	Hey Duggee – Royal Festival Hall at Southbank Centre; Blippi – Apollo Theatre; Midsummer Mechanicals – Sam Wanamaker Playhouse at Globe Theatre; The Smartest Giant in Town – St Martin's Theatre
Best Actor	Best Actress
Paul Mescal as Stanley Kowalski in A Streetcar Named Desire – Almeida Theatre; Tom Hollander as Boris Berezovsky in Patriots – Almeida Theatre; Rafe Spall as Atticus Finch in To Kill a Mockingbird – Gielgud Theatre; David Tennant as John Halder in Good – Harold Pinter Theatre; Giles Terera as Guy Jacobs in Blues for an Alabama Sky – National Theatre Olivier	Jodie Comer as Tessa in Prima Facie – Harold Pinter Theatre; Patsy Ferran as Blanche DuBois in A Streetcar Named Desire – Almeida Theatre; Mei Mac as Mei Kusakabe in My Neighbour Totoro – Barbican Theatre; Janet McTeer as Helen in Pheadra – National Theatre Lyttleton; Nicola Walker as Ms Moffat in The Corn Is Green – National Theatre Lyttleton
Best Actor in a Musical	Best Actress in a Musical
Arthur Darvill as Curly McLain in Oklahoma – Young Vic; Alon Aboutboul as Lt Col Tewfiq Zacharya in The Band's Visit – Donmar Warehouse; Julian Ovenden as Emile de Becque in South Pacific – Sadler's Wells; Andrew Rannells as Jim Bakker in Tammy Faye – Almeida Theatre	Katie Brayben as Tammy Faye Messner in Tammy Faye – Almeida Theatre; Anoushka Lucas as Laurey Williams in Oklahoma – Young Vic; Miri Mesika as Dina in The Band's Visit – Donmar Warehouse; Faith Omole as Joy in Standing at the Sky's Edge – National Theatre Olivier
Best Actor in a Supporting Role	Best Actress in a Supporting Role
Will Keen as Vladimir Putin in Patriots – Almeida Theatre; Mark Akintimehin as Onyx, Emmanuel Akwafo as Pitch, Nnabiko Ejimofor as Jet, Darragh Hand as Sable, Aruna Jalloh as Obsidian and Kaine Lawrence as Midnight in For Black Boys Who Have Considered Suicide When the Hue Gets Too Heavy – Jerwood Downstairs, Royal Court; Elliot Levey as Maurice in Good – Harold Pinter Theatre; David Moorst as Dill Harris in To Kill a Mockingbird – Gielgud Theatre; Sule Rimi as Sam Thomas in Blues for an Alabama Sky – National Theatre Lyttleton	Anjana Vasan as Stella Kowalski in A Streetcar Named Desire – Almeida Theatre; Rose Ayling-Ellis as Celia in As You Like It – @sohoplace; Pamela Nomvete as Calpurnia in To Kill a Mockingbird – Gielgud Theatre; Caroline Quentin as Mrs Malaprop in Jack Absolute Flies Again – National Theatre Olivier; Sharon Small as Helen in Good – Harold Pinter Theatre
Best Actor in a Supporting Role in a Musical	Best Actress in a Supporting Role in a Musical
Zubin Varla as Jerry Falwell in Tammy Faye – Almeida Theatre; Sharif Afifi as Haled in The Band's Visit – Donmar Warehouse; Peter Polycarpou as Avrum in The Band's Visit – Donmar Warehouse; Clive Rowe as Lt Eddie Souther in Sister Act – Eventim Apollo	Beverley Knight as Emmeline Pankhurst in Sylvia – Old Vic; Maimuna Memon as Nikki in Standing at the Sky's Edge – National Theatre Olivier; Liza Sadovy as Aunt Eller Murphy in Oklahoma – Young Vic; Marisha Wallace as Ado Annie Carnes in Oklahoma – Young Vic
Best Director	Best Theatre Choreographer
Phelim McDermott for My Neighbour Totoro – Barbican Theatre; Rebecca Frecknall for A Streetcar Named Desire – Almeida Theatre; Robert Hastie for Standing at the Sky's Edge – National Theatre Olivier; Justin Martin for Prima Facie – Harold Pinter Theatre; Bartlett Sher for To Kill a Mockingbird – Gielgud Theatre	Matt Cole for Newsies – Troubadour Wembley Park Theatre; Lynne Page for Standing at the Sky's Edge – National Theatre Olivier; Kate Prince for Sylvia – Old Vic; Basil Twist for puppetry directing My Neighbour Totoro – Barbican Theatre
Best Set Design	Best Costume Design
Tom Pye for My Neighbour Totoro – Barbican Theatre; Miriam Buether for To Kill a Mockingbird – Gielgud Theatre; Ben Stones for Standing at the Sky's Edge – National Theatre Olivier; Mark Walters for Jack and the Beanstalk – London Palladium	Kimie Nakano for My Neighbour Totoro – Barbican Theatre; Frankie Bradshaw for Blues for an Alabama Sky – National Theatre Lyttleton; Hugh Durrant for Jack and the Beanstalk – London Palladium; Jean Paul Gaultier for Fashion Freak Show – Roundhouse
Best Lighting Design	Best Sound Design
Jessica Hung Han Yun for My Neighbour Totoro – Barbican Theatre; Natasha Chivers for Prima Facie – Harold Pinter Theatre; Lee Curran for A Streetcar Named Desire – Almeida Theatre; Tim Lutkin for The Crucible – National Theatre Olivier	Tony Gayle for My Neighbour Totoro – Barbican Theatre; Bobby Aitken for Standing at the Sky's Edge for National Theatre Olivier; Drew Levy for Oklahoma – Young Vic; Ben Ringham and Max Ringham for Prima Facie – Harold Pinter Theatre
Best Original Score or New Orchestrations
Tom Deering for orchestrating and Richard Hawley for scoring and lyricising Standing at the Sky's Edge – National Theatre Olivier; Andrea Grody for arranging, Jamshied Sharifi for orchestrating and David Yazbek for scoring and lyricising The Band’s Visit – Donmar Warehouse; Joe Hisaishi for scoring and Will Stuart for arranging and orchestrating My Neighbour Totoro – Barbican Theatre; Daniel Kluger for arranging and orchestrating and Nathan Koci for vocal arranging Oklahoma – Young Vic
Best New Dance Production	Outstanding Achievement in Dance
Traplord by Ivan Michael Blackstock – 180 Studios (The Strand); Light of Passage by Crystal Pite – Royal Opera House; Pasionaria by La Veronal – Sadler's Wells; Triptych (The Missing Door, The Lost Room and The Hidden Floor) by Peeping Tom – Barbican Theatre	Dickson Mbi for choreographing Enowate – Sadler's Wells; Manuel Liñán for choreographing ¡VIVA! – Sadler's Wells; Raquel Meseguer Zafe for dramaturging Ruination by Lost Dog – Royal Opera House, Linbury Theatre; Catrina Nisbett for performing in Family Honour, Spoken Movement – Sadler's Wells
Best New Opera Production	Outstanding Achievement in Opera
Alcina, Royal Opera – Royal Opera House; Least Like the Other, Irish National Opera and Royal Opera – Royal Opera House, Linbury Theatre; Peter Grimes, Royal Opera – Royal Opera House; Sibyl – Barbican Theatre	William Kentridge for conceiving and directing Sibyl – Barbican Theatre; Sinéad Campbell-Wallace for performing in Tosca, English National Opera – London Coliseum; Antony McDonald for designing Alcina – Royal Opera House
Outstanding Achievement in an Affiliate Theatre
The P Word – Bush Theatre; Age Is a Feeling – Soho Theatre; Blackout Songs – Hampstead Theatre Downstairs; Paradise Now – Bush Theatre; Two Palestinians Go Dogging – Jerwood Upstairs, Royal Court
Special Recognition Award
Derek Jacobi; Arlene Phillips

== Productions with multiple wins and nominations ==
=== Multiple wins ===
The following 6 productions received multiple awards:

- 6: My Neighbour Totoro
- 3: A Streetcar Named Desire
- 2: Oklahoma, Prima Facie, Standing at the Sky's Edge, Tammy Faye

=== Multiple nominations ===
The following 17 productions and 2 operas received multiple nominations:

- 9: My Neighbour Totoro
- 8: Standing at the Sky's Edge
- 7: Oklahoma
- 6: A Streetcar Named Desire, The Band's Visit, To Kill a Mockingbird
- 5: Prima Facie
- 4: Good, Tammy Faye
- 3: Blues for an Alabama Sky, Jack and the Beanstalk, Patriots, Sylvia
- 2: Alcina, The Crucible, For Black Boys Who Have Considered Suicide When the Hue Gets Too Heavy, Sibyl, Sister Act, South Pacific

== See also ==
- 76th Tony Awards
