= Bank of Dave: The Musical =

Bank of Dave
- The Musical
- Official artwork
- Music: Pippa Cleary
- Lyrics: Pippa Cleary; Rob Madge
- Book: Rob Madge
- Basis: The life of Dave Fishwick and the 2023 film
- Premiere: 2 May 2026: The Lowry, Salford
- Productions: 2026 Salford and Leicester

Bank of Dave: The Musical is a British stage musical with book and lyrics by Rob Madge, and music and lyrics by Pippa Cleary. It is based on the life of Dave Fishwick and the 2023 Netflix film of the same name.

The musical had its world premiere at The Lowry, Salford in May 2026 before moving to Curve, Leicester.

== Development ==
On 23 June 2024, Fishwick announced that a musical was in development on BBC Breakfast with Jason Manford in talks to play the title role.

On 1 August 2025, it was announced that the musical was in development with Rob Madge and Pippa Cleary having previously collaborated on Madge's biographical play My Son's a Queer (But What Can You Do?).

== Productions ==
=== Salford and Leicester (2026) ===
On 22 September 2025, it was announced that the musical would have its world premiere at The Lowry, Salford from 2 to 16 May before transferring to Curve, Leicester from 20 to 30 May 2026. It is directed by Curve's artistic director Nikolai Foster and produced by ROYO, the Lowry, Curve and Future Artists Entertainment. Full casting was announced on 31 March 2026.

== Musical numbers ==
- "Burnley Born and Bred"
- "Put Your Trust In Us" – Sir Charles Denbigh
- "Banged Up"
- "Can You Hear the Mill?"
- "Rich Boys Club"
- "What Heroes Do" – Hugh
- "My Kind of Happy" – Hugh and Alex
- "For Better or For Worse" – Nicky

== Cast and characters ==
Character	Salford / Leicester
Character	2026
Dave Fishwick	Sam Lupton
Sir Charles Denbigh	Samuel Holmes
Nicky	Hayley Tamaddon
Hugh	Lucca Chadwick-Patel
Maureen	Claire Moore
Alex	Lauryn Redding
Danny / Andy	Zachary Willis
Cher / Clarence	Mark Peachey
Megan / Mary	Joni Ayton-Kent
Marco	Adam Colbeck-Dunn
Mavis	Hannah Nuttall
Barbara	Rosie Strobel
Ali	Minal Patel
Omari	Elliot Broadfoot
Betty	Althea Burey
Claire	Jhanaica Van Mook
