= Maimuna Memon =

British actress, composer and playwright (born 1992)

- Born: Maimuna Enya Memon; 1992 (age 33–34); Preston, Lancashire, England
- Education: Oxford School of Drama
- Occupations: Actress, singer, composer and playwright
- Years active: 2015–present

Maimuna Enya Memon (born 1992) is a British actress, singer, composer and playwright. She won a Laurence Olivier Award for her performance in the musical Natasha, Pierre & The Great Comet of 1812, having previously been nominated for her role in Standing at the Sky's Edge.

== Early life ==
Memon was born in Preston, Lancashire, to an Irish mother and a Pakistani father and spent her early childhood in Darwen. As a teen, her family moved to Australia, where they settled in Chuwar, a suburb of Ipswich near Brisbane. Upon returning to England at the age of 18, Memon studied at the Oxford School of Drama, graduating in 2015.

== Career ==
Upon graduating from drama school, Memon made her professional stage debut as Florinda in the Manchester Royal Exchange production of Into the Woods. The following year, she made her television debut in an episode of the BBC One medical soap opera Doctors, and appeared in The Busker's Opera at the Park Theatre and Lazarus at King's Cross Theatre.

In 2017, Memon played Mary Magdalene in Jesus Christ Superstar at Regent's Park Open Air Theatre. She wrote the music and lyrics for, and performed in, James Meteyard's Electrolyte in 2019.

Memon originated the role of Nikki in Richard Hawley's musical Standing at the Sky's Edge, which premiered in 2019 at the Sheffield Crucible. Memon reprised her role when the musical returned to Sheffield in 2022, and in 2023 at the National Theatre in London. For her performance, she was nominated for the Laurence Olivier Award for Best Supporting Actress in a Musical.

Memon began releasing music in 2022, beginning with the singles "First Born Child" and "Calling". Her one-woman play Manic Street Creature premiered at the 2022 Edinburgh Fringe Festival, where it won a Fringe First Award, before having a London run at Southwark Playhouse in 2023. A new version of Memon's play will be performed in London at Kiln Theatre in 2026. She also composed a score for Henry VIII at Shakespeare's Globe and, as of 2023, was in the midst of composing a score for Portia Coughlan.

In 2024, she portrayed Sonya in the London premiere of Natasha, Pierre & The Great Comet of 1812 at Donmar Warehouse from December until February 2025. Memon received widespread acclaim for her performance, which earned her the Laurence Olivier Award for Best Actress in a Supporting Role in a Musical.

== Discography ==
=== EPs ===
- More Than I Bargained For (2023)

=== Singles ===
- "First Born Child" (2022)
- "Calling" (2022)
- "Sinner" (2023)
- "Insomnia" (2024)
- "Selling" (2023)

== Filmography ==
Year	Title	Role	Notes
2016	Doctors	PC Kelsey Phillips	Episode: "Grey Area"
2018	Unforgotten	Officer	1 episode
2018	Lazarus	Teenage Girl 1	Film
2022	Sherwood	Anoushka Aram	1 episode
2023	Time	Tahani	1 episode
2024	Domino Day	Verdita	Series regular; 5 episodes
2025	Brides	Hanan	Film
2026	Patience	Vanessa Fitzpatrick	Episode: "Music in the Minster"

== Stage ==
Year	Title	Role	Notes
2015	Into the Woods	Florinda	Royal Exchange, Manchester
2016	The Busker's Opera	Jenny Diver	Park Theatre, London
2016–2017	Lazarus	Teenage Girl	King's Cross Theatre, London
2017	Winnie and Wilbur	Various	Birmingham Repertory Theatre
2017	Jesus Christ Superstar	Mary Magdalene	Regent's Park Open Air Theatre, London
2018	The Assassination of Katie Hopkins	Shayma	Theatr Clwyd, Mold
2019	Hobson's Choice	Sunita	Royal Exchange, Manchester
2019	Electrolyte	Allie Touch	Music; Edinburgh Fringe Festival
2019	Ghost Quartet	Pearl White/Sheherazade/Soldier/Lady Usher/Camera Shop Owner	Boulevard Theatre, London
2019, 2022–2023	Standing at the Sky's Edge	Nikki	Crucible Theatre, Sheffield / National Theatre, London
2021	The Band Plays On	Jess	Sheffield Theatres
2021	Living Newspaper Edition 6	C	Royal Court Theatre, London
2021	Nine Lessons and Carols	Singer	Almeida Theatre, London
2022	Henry VIII	—N/a	Music; Globe Theatre, London
2022–2023, 2026	Manic Street Creature	Ria	Playwright; Edinburgh Fringe Festival / Southwark Playhouse, London / Kiln Theatre, London
2024	The Grapes of Wrath	Band vocal, banjo, woman with guitar	Music; Lyttelton Theatre
2024–2025	Natasha, Pierre & The Great Comet of 1812	Sonya Rostova	Donmar Warehouse
2026	A Midsummer Night’s Dream	—N/a	Music; Regent's Park Open Air Theatre, London

== Awards and nominations ==
Year	Award	Category	Work	Result	Ref.
2020	Offie	Performance Ensemble	Ghost Quartet	Nominated	(Note: Shared with Carly Bawden, Niccolò Curradi and Zubin Varla.)
2022	Edinburgh Fringe Festival	Fringe First Award	Manic Street Creature	Won	
2023	Laurence Olivier Awards	Best Supporting Actress in a Musical	Standing at the Sky's Edge	Nominated	
2025	Laurence Olivier Awards	Best Supporting Actress in a Musical	Natasha, Pierre & The Great Comet of 1812	Won	
