= Robert Madge (actor) =

British actor (born 1996)

Rob Madge
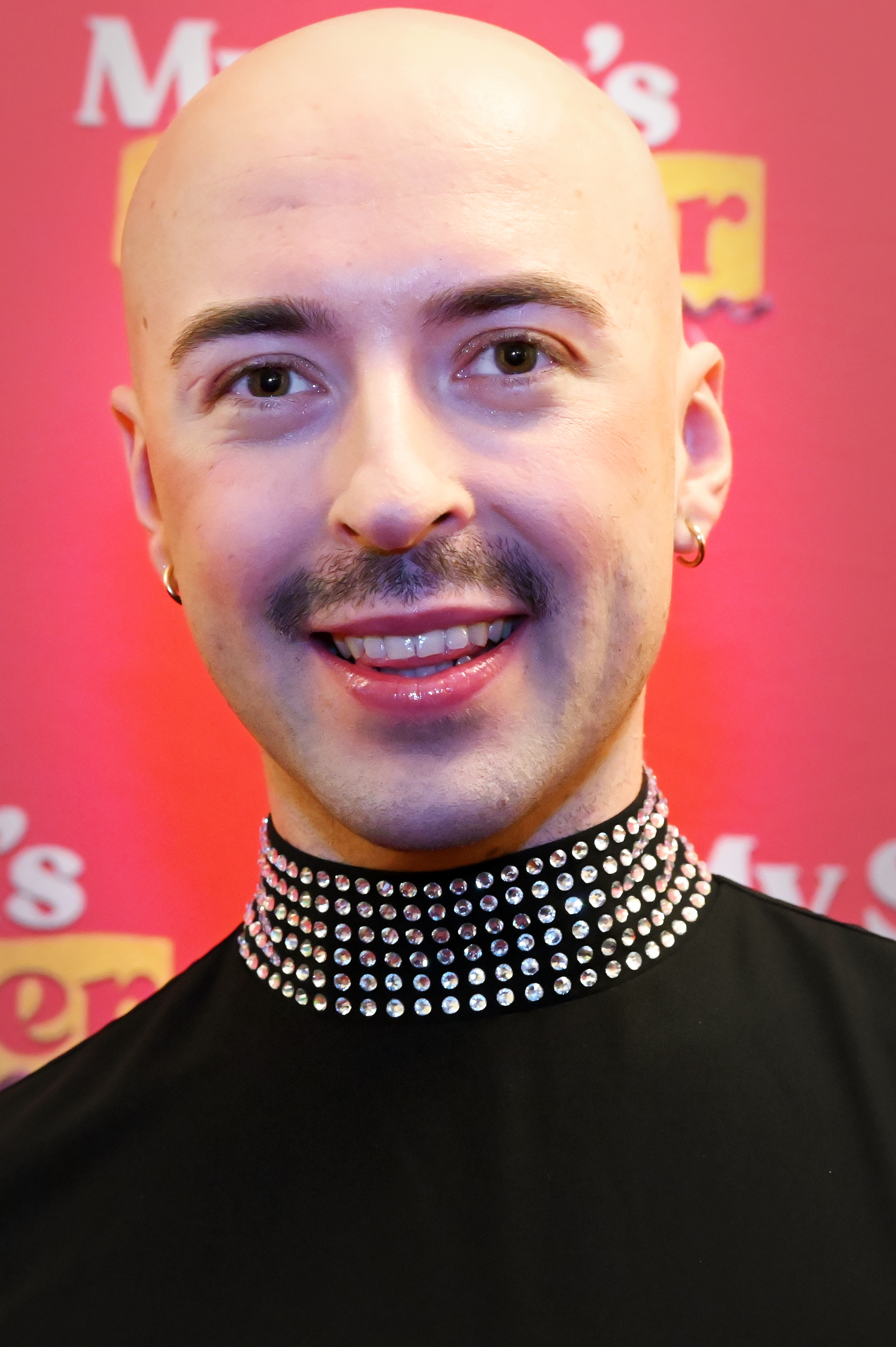
- Madge in 2025
- Born: Robert Dennis Madge; 2 August 1996 (age 30); Coventry, England
- Occupation: Actor
- Years active: 2005–present

Rob Madge (born 2 August 1996) is an English actor, writer and musical theatre performer. Madge first rose to prominence as a child actor, appearing in the West End musicals Mary Poppins and Oliver! before appearing as Gavroche in Les Misérables in the 25th Anniversary Concert at The O2.

As an adult, they are best known for writing and starring in the WhatsOnStage Award winning and Laurence Olivier Award-nominated autobiographical solo show My Son's a Queer (But What Can You Do?), which has been performed in the West End, as well as appearing in the world premiere UK and Ireland tour of Bedknobs and Broomsticks and the London Palladium pantomimes.

== Career ==
=== Early career ===
Madge discovered their love for performing at a young age and made their professional debut at the age of 9, when they starred as Michael Banks in the original West End production of Mary Poppins at the Prince Edward Theatre from 2005 to 2007. In autumn 2007, they played Fleance in Macbeth at the Gielgud Theatre starring Patrick Stewart and Kate Fleetwood, directed by Rupert Goold. They then appeared in the role of the Artful Dodger in the West End revival of Oliver! at the Theatre Royal, Drury Lane, also directed by Goold shortly followed by their acclaimed performance as Gavroche in Les Misérables at the Queen's Theatre as well as getting the opportunity to perform the role in the 25th Anniversary Concert at The O2 in October 2010. Madge also played Reginald in the world premiere of Matilda at the Royal Shakespeare Company in Stratford-upon-Avon from November 2010 to January 2011.

Madge had their first adult role in the Les Misérables UK and Ireland tour beginning October 2019, playing the role of student Jean Prouvaire before being cut short in March 2020 due to the COVID-19 pandemic.

=== My Son's a Queer (But What Can You Do?) ===
My Son's a Queer (But What Can You Do?) is a one-person play written and performed by Madge (with lyrics by Madge and Pippa Cleary and Music by Cleary), directed by Luke Sheppard, which is a coming of age, autobiographical story of Madge when they were a child attempting to stage a full-blown one-person Disney show in their home; it also explores Madge's uplifting and inspiring discovery that they are non-binary. The show premiered at the Turbine Theatre in June 2021, winning the 2022 WhatsOnStage Award for Best Off-West End show in 2022. The show transferred to the Edinburgh Fringe Festival in August 2022 before transferring to the West End at the Garrick Theatre in October 2022 and the Ambassadors Theatre in January 2023 for limited runs where it was nominated for the 2023 Laurence Olivier Award for Best Entertainment or Comedy Play.

The show was scheduled to open at the Lyceum Theatre on Broadway on 27 February 2024 for 16 week limited engagement. before announcing it would be postponed until the following 2024-25 season with an unconfirmed theatre and dates. Madge wrote and performed a new show in response to the postponement called Rob Madge's Regards to Broadway which played at the Garrick Theatre on 26 May 2024.

In July and August 2024, the show toured the UK tour before returning to the Edinburgh Fringe.

In June 2025, the show played for 5 performances at the New York City Center, Off-Broadway.

=== Recent career ===
In August 2021, Madge began touring as Norton the Fish in Bedknobs and Broomsticks, which premiered at the Theatre Royal in Newcastle upon Tyne. They followed this with a month's run at The Other Palace, starring in a new musical, Millenials: A Pop Song Cycle, in July 2022.

In December 2022, Madge appeared in pantomime as Pat The Cow in Jack and the Beanstalk at the London Palladium, alongside Julian Clary and Dawn French. In December 2023, they returned to the Palladium pantomime as Tink in Peter Pan and returned in December 2024 as The Spirit of Sherwood in Robin Hood.

In October 2023, Madge won The Theatre Award in the 2023 Virgin Atlantic Attitude Awards.

In September 2024, Madge played Alex in Buyer & Cellar at the King's Head Theatre, Off-West End before transferring to The Drum at Theatre Royal, Plymouth.

Madge starred as The Emcee in the West End revival of Cabaret at the Kit Kat Club (Playhouse Theatre) for a limited run alongside Hannah Dodd as Sally Bowles until September 2025. Madge performed the song 'Wilkommen' from Cabaret at West End Live on the 21st June 2025 alongside several cast members.

Madge is writing an adaptation of Charley's Aunt by Brandon Thomas for the Watermill Theatre, Newbury which is set to premiere in October 2025. They will also write the book and lyrics (with music and lyrics by Pippa Cleary) for a new musical, Bank of Dave: The Musical based on the life story of Dave Fishwick for The Lowry, Salford and Curve, Leicester in May 2026.

== Personal life ==
Madge is non-binary and uses they/them pronouns.

== Stage credits ==
=== As actor ===
| Year | Production | Role | Theatre | Location |
|---|---|---|---|---|
| 2005–07 | Mary Poppins | Michael Banks | Prince Edward Theatre | West End |
| 2007 | Macbeth | Fleance | Gielgud Theatre | West End |
| 2008–09 | Oliver! | Artful Dodger | Theatre Royal, Drury Lane, West End | West End |
| 2010 | Les Misérables | Gavroche | Barbican Theatre | West End |
| 2010 | Les Misérables in Concert: The 25th Anniversary | Gavroche | The O2 | London |
| 2010–11 | Matilda the Musical | Reginald | Courtyard Theatre | Stratford Upon Avon |
| 2019–20 | Les Misérables | Jean Prouvaire | UK & Ireland Tour | —N/a |
| 2021 | My Son's a Queer (But What Can You Do?) | Themself (also writer) | Turbine Theatre | Off-West End |
| 2021–22 | Bedknobs and Broomsticks | Norton | UK & Ireland Tour | —N/a |
| 2022 | Millenials: A Pop Song Cycle | Multi-role | The Other Palace | Off-West End |
| 2022 | My Son's a Queer (But What Can You Do?) | Themself (also writer) | Edinburgh Fringe Festival | Edinburgh |
| 2022 | My Son's a Queer (But What Can You Do?) | Themself (also writer) | Norwich Playhouse | Norwich |
| 2022 | My Son's a Queer (But What Can You Do?) | Themself (also writer) | Garrick Theatre | West End |
| 2022–23 | Jack & The Beanstalk | Pat The Cow | London Palladium | West End |
| 2023 | My Son's a Queer (But What Can You Do?) | Themself (also writer) | Ambassadors Theatre | West End |
| 2023–24 | Peter Pan | Tink | London Palladium | West End |
| 2024 | Rob Madge's Regards to Broadway | Themself (also writer) | Garrick Theatre | West End |
| 2024 | My Son's a Queer (But What Can You Do?) | Themself (also writer) | UK & Ireland Tour | —N/a |
| 2024 | Buyer & Cellar | Alex | King's Head Theatre | Off West End |
| 2024 | Buyer & Cellar | Alex | The Drum, Theatre Royal Plymouth | Plymouth |
| 2024–25 | Robin Hood | The Spirit of Sherwood | London Palladium | West End |
| 2025 | Cabaret | The Emcee | Playhouse Theatre | West End |
| 2025 | My Son's a Queer (But What Can You Do?) | Themself (also writer) | New York City Center | New York City |
| 2025 | Acorn Antiques: The Musical | Derek | Hope Mill Theatre | Manchester |
| 2025–26 | Sleeping Beauty | The Diva of Dreams | London Palladium | West End |
| 2026 | Les Misérables: The Arena Spectacular | Bamatabois | international arena tour | World Arena Concert Tour |
| 2026-2027 | Cinderella | Sequins | London Palladium | West End |

=== As writer ===
- My Son's a Queer (But What Can You Do?) (2021 - Turbine Theatre / Edinburgh Festival Fringe / West End / UK tour / New York City, with songs by Madge and Pippa Cleary)
- Rob Madge's Regards to Broadway (2024 - Garrick Theatre, with songs by Madge and Pippa Cleary)
- Charley's Aunt (2025 - Watermill Theatre, adaptation based on Brandon Thomas' farce)
- Bank of Dave: The Musical (2026 - The Lowry, Salford and Curve, Leicester, book and lyrics, with music and lyrics by Pippa Cleary)
