= My Neighbour Totoro (play) =

2022 stage adaptation

- Official production artwork
- Written by: Tom Morton-Smith
- Based on: My Neighbor Totoro by Hayao Miyazaki
- Music by: Joe Hisaishi

Premiere
- Date: 8 October 2022
- Place: Barbican Centre, London
- Directed by: Phelim McDermott

My Neighbour Totoro is a stage play based on Studio Ghibli's 1988 animated film of the same name by Hayao Miyazaki. It is adapted by Tom Morton-Smith with music by Joe Hisaishi. The play premiered at London's Barbican Centre in 2022, and a West End production opened in March 2025.

== Synopsis ==
In 1950s Japan, two girls, Satsuki and Mei, whose mother has been hospitalised with tuberculosis, relocate to a village in the countryside. Their new house, in which they live with their professor father, Tatsuo, is haunted with soot spirits, susuwatari, and they encounter Totoro, a "forest spirit who looks like the result of an experimental breeding programme involving a chinchilla, a barn owl and a bean-bag sofa". Mei is the first to discover him, and he comforts the girls with his presence.

== Cast and characters ==
Character	Barbican Centre		Original West End
Character	2022	2023	2025
Satsuki	Ami Okumura Jones	Ami Okumura Jones	Ami Okumura Jones
Mei	Mei Mac	Mei Mac	Victoria Chen
Yasuko	Haruka Abe	Emily Piggford	Phyllis Ho
Tatsuo	Dai Tabuchi	Dai Tabuchi	Dai Tabuchi
Kanta	Nino Furuhata	Ka Long Kelvin Chan	Steven Nguyen
Granny	Jacqueline Tate	Jacqueline Tate	Jacqueline Tate
Miss Hara	Susan Momoko Hingley	Arina Ii	Shaofan Wilson
Nurse Emiko	Haruka Kuroda	Amanda Maud	Kumiko Mendl
Tsukiko	Kanako Nakano	Naomi Yang	Deanna Myers
Hiroshi	Michael Phong Le	Andrew Futaishi	Jamie Zubairi
Kazego Principal Puppeteers		Matthew Leonhart; Yojiro Ichikawa; Arina Ii	Matthew Leonhart; Heather Lai
Kazego Puppeteers	Li-Leng Au; Boaz Chad; Andrew Futaishi; Zachary Hing; Yojiro Ichikawa; Arina Ii; Marian Lee; Matthew Leonhart; Aki Nakagawa; Tobi Poster-Su; Si Rawlinson; Shaofan Wilson	Jessie Baek; Jasmine Bayes; Boaz Chad; Jasmine Chiu; Elizabeth Chu; Anna Kato; Heather Lai; Yuki Nitta; Bright Ong; Mark Takeshi Ota; Daniel Phung; Si Rawlinson; Gun Suen; Shaofan Wilson	Boaz Chad; Rachel Clare Chan; Sally Cheng; Sabrina Pui Yee Chin; Victor Itang; Gabriel S. Janoras; Anna Kato; Ronnie Lee; Wen Hsin Lee; Amber Lin; Sera Maehara; Annakanako Mohri; Lucy Park; Richard P. Peralta; Chloe Ragrag; Nathaniel Tan
Singer	Ai Ninomiya	Ai Ninomiya	Ai Ninomiya

== Background ==
The play is based on the 1988 film My Neighbour Totoro written by Hayao Miyazaki of Studio Ghibli. It was adapted by Tom Morton-Smith with music by Joe Hisaishi. It is directed by Phelim McDermott, produced by Hisaishi and the Royal Shakespeare Company, in collaboration with Improbable and Nippon TV. The play was created with Miyazaki's blessing, on the condition that Hisaishi was involved; Hisaishi had wanted to see an original Japanese-language show performed internationally. Morton-Smith began work on the stage adaptation years prior to the play's first production. He had difficulty adapting it from film due to its structure, saying that the movie contradicted "everything [he] thought [he] knew about dramatic structure and that he saw his job as "translation as well as adaptation". Reviewers comparing the movie and the play have noted that the adaptation has more speaking and greater development of supporting characters, with more emphasis on the interactions between people. They have also written of the length, pointing out that it is nearly an hour longer than the film.

According to Morton-Smith, rehearsals began without the script, with it only being taken into the rehearsal room on the second week. Casting of the children were done using adult actors, with Johnny Oleksinski writing in the New York Post that he believed it was due to the need to create Miyazaki's effect of "anime-style young people": child actors would not have been able to capture the same nuances in character. However, Nick Curtis of the Evening Standard wrote that it meant that the "tropes of child acting [were] thoroughly overworked". Furuhata's portrayal of Kanta received mixed reviews, with Oleksinski calling his performance "tender" and hilarious and Quentin Letts of The Sunday Times writing it was "delightful [and] quirky"; Curtis said that it was a "parody of awkwardness".

The play makes extensive use of puppets, with puppetmaster Basil Twist saying that "Totoro must be that you want to touch him, that you want to fall asleep on his belly". In particular, the Japanese producers strongly advocated for the use of human puppeteers instead of machines: the product was a new "wind spirit" style of puppetry. Prototypes were created in San Francisco by Twist, who brought them to London for further work with consultants and McDermott. The prototypes were then sent to Jim Henson's Creature Shop in Los Angeles for detailed crafting of the small parts and materials.

The set was created out of steel base, with an oak veneer, and used shou sugi ban to treat some of the house's wood surfaces. Saying that "there's nothing less Japanese" than having plastic leaves to represent the forest, production designer Tom Pye used wood liberally, using two-dimensional layers instead of using three-dimensional props.

== Productions ==
=== London (2022–2024) ===
On 19 May 2022, the production broke the Barbican Centre, London's box-office record for ticket sales in one day, previously held by the 2015 production of Hamlet starring Benedict Cumberbatch. It premiered at the Barbican previewing from 8 October, with an official press night on 18 October and running until 21 January 2023.

On 30 March 2023, the production returned to the Barbican for another season, running from 21 November 2023 to 23 March 2024.

=== West End (2025–2027) ===
The production transferred to London's West End for a 34-week run on 8 March 2025 at Gillian Lynne Theatre, which was later extended to March 2026 and then August 30, 2026. Casting was announced on 15 January 2025. A final extension to 10 January 2027 was announced in May 2026.

== Themes ==
My Neighbour Totoro focuses on the illness of loved ones, love of the environment and fear, with Tom Pye stating that the story had become more relevant due to COVID-19 prevention measures and global warming. Mei Mac, who played Mei, agreed with Pye's assessment of the pandemic's effect and said, "At its heart, Totoro is about grief, and these two girls who are missing their sick mother."

== Critical reception ==
While criticising the pace of the play due to how closely it mirrored the movie, Sarah Hemming of the Financial Times gave it five stars, praising the portrayal of the main characters and called the play a "gorgeous, uplifting tribute to the link between theatre and the imaginative realm of children's play". The Daily Telegraph's Dominic Cavendish also observed that the pace was due to the film, but called it "intoxicating [and] detail-savouring". Awarding it four stars, he compared it to a pantomime but ultimately praised it as a "vital power surge of Anglo-Japanese creative electricity fit for these soul-sapped times".

In a five-star review in The Guardian, Arifa Akbar compared the play to the movie, writing that there was a "different imagination at work here, but it is just as enchanting and perhaps more emotionally impactful". She highlighted the puppeteers' role, calling them a "human field of corn, swaying as one" and describing Totoro as "formidable, rumbling, eerie, comic and endearing at once". Also praising their role was its sister paper's Susannah Clapp, praising them in a four-star review as the "souls of the creatures and the real pulse of the play". Identically giving it four stars, Johnny Oleksinski of the New York Post called for the play to be shown on Broadway, saying that it "balances jaw-dropping effects with soul and emotional intelligence" and it played host to "one of the most stunning theatrical images in years".

Cautioning that watching Totoro would lead to "sore cheeks" from the "two and a half hours you'll spend grinning from ear to ear", The Independent's Annabel Nugent gave it four stars; she likened the set's ability to adapt to origami but said that the music was occasionally not a strong enough partner to the "splendour of the visual storytelling". Writing in The Times, Clive Davis also picked out the music for criticism in a four-star review, attacking it as "so insipid" but praising the protagonists' portrayal, puppeteers, and set.

Giving it four stars in its Sunday edition, Quentin Letts called the play "likeably impassive [and] lightly surreal". He said that its lack of evil was a double-edged sword, but admitted that the play would probably be a good fit for children. Likewise focusing on the light nature was Nick Curtis of the Evening Standard, who stated in a three-star review that Totoro needed "more jeopardy, more darkness and more of the monsters". Comparing Totoro to another play, Matilda, that he believed the Royal Shakespeare Company were trying to emulate, he said it was not "quirky or adult-friendly enough" to be the same, saying that it was "easier to admire than to love". Also making a comparison between the two plays was Matt Wolf of The New York Times, who said that they were "family entertainment that adults might like even more than children". While criticising the quick changes in tone for the ending as the play's one error, Wolf called the "kindness, empathy and generosity of spirit" "infectious".

On 8 December 2022, it was announced that My Neighbour Totoro led the nominations for the 2023 WhatsOnStage Awards, earning nine nominations. My Neighbour Totoro came fifth on The Independent's best theatre of 2022 ranking.

== Awards ==
=== Original production ===
Year	Award	Category	Nominee	Result	Ref.
2023	WhatsOnStage Awards	Best New Play		Shortlisted	
2023	WhatsOnStage Awards	Best Performer in a Play	Mei Mac	Shortlisted	
2023	WhatsOnStage Awards	Best Director	Phelim McDermott	Won	
2023	WhatsOnStage Awards	Best Musical Direction/Supervision	Bruce O'Neil and Matt Smith	Won	
2023	WhatsOnStage Awards	Best Lighting Design	Jessica Hung Han Yun	Won	
2023	WhatsOnStage Awards	Best Set Design	Tom Pye and Basil Twist	Won	
2023	WhatsOnStage Awards	Best Sound Design	Tony Gayle	Won	
2023	WhatsOnStage Awards	Best Video Design	Finn Ross and Andrea Scott	Shortlisted	
2023	WhatsOnStage Awards	Best Graphic Design	Toshio Suzuki and Dewynters	Shortlisted	
2023	Laurence Olivier Awards	Best Entertainment or Comedy Play		Won	
2023	Laurence Olivier Awards	Best Director	Phelim McDermott	Won	
2023	Laurence Olivier Awards	Best Theatre Choreographer	Basil Twist	Nominated	
2023	Laurence Olivier Awards	Best Original Score	Joe Hisaishi and Will Stuart	Nominated	
2023	Laurence Olivier Awards	Best Actress	Mei Mac	Nominated	
2023	Laurence Olivier Awards	Best Costume Design	Kimie Nakano	Won	
2023	Laurence Olivier Awards	Best Set Design	Tom Pye	Won	
2023	Laurence Olivier Awards	Best Lighting Design	Jessica Hung Han Yun	Won	
2023	Laurence Olivier Awards	Best Sound Design	Tony Gayle	Won	
2023	Critics' Circle Theatre Awards	Best Designer	Tom Pye	Won	
2023	The Stage Debut Awards	Best Designer (video)	Andrea Scott	Won	
