= The War Between the Land and the Sea =

2025 British science fiction television miniseries

- Genre: Drama; Science fiction
- Created by: Russell T Davies
- Showrunners: Russell T Davies; Pete McTighe
- Written by: Russell T Davies; Pete McTighe
- Directed by: Dylan Holmes Williams
- Starring: Russell Tovey; Gugu Mbatha-Raw
- Composer: Lorne Balfe
- Country of origin: United Kingdom
- Original language: English
- No. of series: 1
- No. of episodes: 5

Production
- Executive producers: Joel Collins; Pete McTighe; Russell T Davies; Julie Gardner; Jane Tranter
- Producer: Edoardo Ferretti
- Production locations: Spain; United States; Wales
- Cinematography: Dale Elena McCready
- Editors: Tim Hodges; Mdhamiri Á Nkemi
- Running time: 43–53 minutes
- Production companies: Bad Wolf; BBC Studios

Original release
- Network: BBC One (Note: The United Kingdom and Ireland)
- Release: 7 December – 21 December 2025
- Network: Disney+ (Note: Excluding the United Kingdom and Ireland)

Related
- Doctor Who; Whoniverse

The War Between the Land and the Sea is a British science fiction drama television miniseries. The series was created by Russell T Davies for BBC One and Disney+ as part of the Doctor Who franchise, known as the Whoniverse.

Starring Russell Tovey and Gugu Mbatha-Raw, the series features UNIT in their attempt to prevent a global war caused by the return of the Sea Devils, now known as "Homo Aqua". Jemma Redgrave, Colin McFarlane, Alexander Devrient and Ruth Madeley reprise their respective roles from Doctor Who and its franchised series. The series was first reported on in July 2024, and filmed from August to December 2024 across Wales, Cardiff and Spain. Of the five episodes, the premiere and finale were written by Davies, with the other three by Pete McTighe.

The War Between the Land and the Sea premiered on BBC One on 7 December 2025 with its first two episodes, and is expected to be released on Disney+ in 2026. The series has received generally positive reviews from critics for its performances (particularly Redgrave's) and its similarities to Torchwood.

== Cast ==
=== Main ===
- Russell Tovey as Barclay Pierre-Dupont, a low-level UNIT transportation logistics manager who is unexpectedly appointed as humanity's ambassador.
- Gugu Mbatha-Raw as Salt, a Homo Amphibia who serves as Ambassador of the Homo Aqua.

=== Recurring ===
- Jemma Redgrave as Kate Lethbridge-Stewart, the commander-in-chief of UNIT. Redgrave reprises her role from Doctor Who.
- Colin McFarlane as General Austin Pierce, a high-ranking American UNIT officer. McFarlane reprises his role from Torchwood: Children of Earth.
- Alexander Devrient as Colonel Christofer "Chris" Ibrahim, a senior UNIT officer who is part of Kate's personal staff who is killed protecting Kate. Devrient reprises his role from Doctor Who.
- Ruth Madeley as Shirley Bingham, UNIT's fifty-sixth scientific advisor and part of Kate's personal staff. Madeley reprises her role from Doctor Who.
- Adrian Lukis as Sir Jonathan Hynes, a British politician initially appointed as humanity's ambassador.
- Vincent Franklin as Harry Shaw, the Prime Minister.
- Steward Alexander as General Oscar Gunsberg, a United States Army diplomatic envoy and ally of Shaw.
- Barbara Probst as General Dominique Dussolier, a French Navy diplomatic envoy and ally of Shaw.
- Patrick Baladi as Sir Keith Spears, a water utilities businessman, key ally and donor of Shaw.
- Francesca Corney as Sergeant Hana Chakri, a UNIT soldier assigned to protect Barclay.
- Ann Akinjirin as Barbara Pierre-Dupont, Barclay's ex-wife.
- Cat Gannon as Kirby Pierre-Dupont, Barclay and Barbara's teenage child.
- Lachele Carl as Trinity Wells, an American news reporter. Carl reprises her role from Doctor Who.
- Samuel Oatley as Tide, a Homo Amphibia representative who succeeds Salt as Ambassador of Homo Aqua.
- Catherine Garton as Corporal Jane Hart, a UNIT soldier.
- George Robinson as Steve Chesney, a UNIT computer expert.

=== Guest ===
- Mei Mac as Min Tso, a UNIT science and technology chief technician.
- Hannah Donaldson as Captain Louise Mackie, a UNIT company officer specialising in translation.
- William Gaminara as Ted Campbell, a humanity deputy ambassador from South Africa.
- Manpreet Bachu as Ravi Singh, another operative on the ship sent into the Romanche Trench.
- Carolin Stoltz as Elizabeth, Kate’s psychiatrist.

== Episodes ==
No.	Title	Directed by	Written by	Original release date	UK viewers (millions)
1	"Homo Aqua"	Dylan Holmes Williams	Russell T Davies	7 December 2025	4.31
In an administrative error, logistics manager Barclay Pierre-Dupont becomes involved in a covert mission by the independent international agency Unified Intelligence Taskforce in Dragonera, Mediterranean Sea after the discovery and killing of a Sea Devil by fishermen. Dubbed Homo Aqua by UNIT General Austin Pierce, the deceased creature is recaptured by its own kind, killing two UNIT soldiers in the process. UNIT initiates first contact and agrees a treaty of peace, and the Homo Aqua simultaneously reveal their presence to humanity worldwide, desiring to speak to all humans. A meeting is set up in London and several members of the Homo Aqua are seen for the first time. They introduce their humanoid ambassador, Salt, who rejects humanity’s nominated ambassador, and requests Barclay serve as the human ambassador due to respect he showed to the deceased Homo Aqua previously. While initially hesitant, Barclay reluctantly agrees.
2	"Plastic Apocalypse"	Dylan Holmes Williams	Pete McTighe	7 December 2025	3.56
Kate Lethbridge-Stewart, commander-in-chief of UNIT, agrees to work with Barclay to carry out diplomatic negotiations with Homo Aqua, who wish worldwide pollution to cease. UNIT scientists examine eggs bred by Salt affected by pollution. At the next meeting, Salt requests Barclay drink contaminated water from the River Thames, but he refuses. Against UNIT instruction, he chooses to acknowledge humanity's polluting actions instead. Humanity presents a plan to reduce pollution within forty years, which Salt disagrees with. In response, the Homo Aqua use their technology to releases all rubbish from the world's waters back onto land (including the sunken Titanic), causing numerous fatalities. They then demand international shipping water and airways be closed. When world leaders challenge Salt, Barclay agrees to meet with the Homo Aqua under the Atlantic Ocean in the Romanche Gap.
3	"The Deep"	Dylan Holmes Williams	Pete McTighe	14 December 2025	3.71
A UNIT team, consisting of Barclay, Pierce, technician Min Tso, Captain Louise Mackey, and diplomatic representatives Singh and Campbell, undergo Royal Navy training before the underwater meeting; Campbell brings a globe as a gift for Salt. During their submarine descent, Kate meets at Downing Street with Prime Minister Harry Shaw, US Army General Gunsberg, French Navy General Dussolier and utilities businessman Sir Keith Spears as tensions rise over who owns the world’s water. A new war plan to exterminate Homo Aqua, named "Severance", is prepared by Shaw, Spears, Gunsberg and Dussolier, who attempt to assassinate Kate but instead kill her partner, Colonel Christofer Ibrahim. The assassin is killed, and after Shaw realises he can be traced back to him via Spears orders Spears killed as well. At the Romanche Gap, the UNIT team exits into a safe environment created for them by Homo Aqua. Once in front of Salt's assembly, Campbell reveals himself as a Severance mole and detonates a bomb hidden inside the globe.
4	"The Witch of the Waterfall"	Dylan Holmes Williams	Pete McTighe	14 December 2025	3.20
The entire submarine crew and hundreds of Homo Aqua are killed by the explosion, except Barclay, who is saved by Salt. A deepfake of Salt is shown to the public, appearing to take responsibility for the bombing and threatening any human who enters the water. Salt is captured by UNIT but Barclay helps her escape. Shaw is pressured by Gunsberg into moving forward with Severance, and agrees to have Spears, the obvious link, killed. Kate meets Salt's successor, Ambassador Tide, who informs 10 Downing Street that Salt is considered a traitor for saving a human and is subject to execution, threatening to use rust to destroy metal and cripple the Earth's fighting capabilities unless UNIT finds and hands her over to Homo Aqua. Salt and Barclay go on the run, admit their feelings for each other and kiss. Barclay contacts his ex-wife and requests they rendezvous on Lambeth Bridge, with a plan to hide Salt in North Wales. He also attempts to contact Kate to explain the situation. They are ambushed by both UNIT and British Army troops whom Shaw has given Gunsberg command of. When it is revealed that the video of Salt is a deepfake, Kate threatens to fire on the British soldiers to protect Salt and Barclay. Salt releases a high-pitched shriek, disabling all the troops, giving her time to escape into the River Thames.
5	"The End of the War"	Dylan Holmes Williams	Russell T Davies	21 December 2025	3.08
Homo Aqua expedite the melting of the ice caps, threatening to flood and choke humanity with carbon dioxide release. Kate struggles with PTSD after Ibrahim’s death, blackmailing her therapist to increase her paroxetine dose. Barclay begins secret nightly visits to Herne Bay, calling for Salt in the sea. In London, Kate threatens Shaw about Severance, but he denies knowledge of it. After Dussolier deactivates a signal disruptor, Barclay and Salt finally meet, and she doesn’t support the drastic actions. She tells him to ask for "accord", which has ancient meaning with Homo Aqua. UNIT agrees to broadcast the message throughout the oceans. However, thousands of deceased Homo Aqua begin showing up globally. Kate deduces it is biowarfare as part of Severance, where Downing Street engineered a virus that killed 90% of Homo Aqua. The Sea Devils surrender and tell humanity they have won the war, but that they have hidden their technology coveted by humanity in underwater lakes out of humanity's reach. Salt implies that they know who created the virus and to beware because "...water will find you one day." Barclay tearfully apologises, having not known. Homo Aqua accept terms to living unmolested in the deepest part of the Marianas Trench. Kate drives Barclay to the sea, and he finds Salt there. Salt gives Barclay gills, and they swim away together. Afterwards, Kate threatens a nearby jogger at gunpoint when he dumps a plastic bottle near the shore.

== Production ==
=== Development ===
In July 2024, Deadline Hollywood reported a new Doctor Who spin-off titled The War Between the Land and the Sea was set to begin filming in September. Russell T Davies confirmed later that month at San Diego Comic Con that production would begin in August. Produced by Bad Wolf and BBC Studios, Davies served as executive producer along with Pete McTighe, Joel Collins, Julie Gardner, and Jane Tranter. Edoardo Ferretti took on the role of television producer with pre-production underway by July 2024.

=== Casting ===
Russell Tovey and Gugu Mbatha-Raw lead the series with Jemma Redgrave and Alexander Devrient reprising their roles from Doctor Who as Kate Lethbridge-Stewart and Colonel Ibrahim, respectively. Tovey and Mbatha-Raw previously played Alonso Frame and Tish Jones in Doctor Who. Ruth Madeley also returns from Doctor Who, playing Shirley Anne Bingham. Colin McFarlane reprises his role as General Austin Pierce, a character first introduced and last seen fifteen years prior in the third series of Torchwood, another Doctor Who spin-off. Adrian Lukis, Patrick Baladi, Vincent Franklin, Francesca Corney and Mei Mac were announced as additional cast members in October 2024.

=== Writing ===
The five-part series was written by Davies and Pete McTighe. According to McTighe, Davies had already devised the series' concept and scripted its first episode prior to writing the 60th anniversary specials of Doctor Who, which marked the beginning of his second tenure on the series as writer and showrunner. After McTighe delivered the first draft of "Lucky Day", his episode of the fifteenth series of Doctor Who (and third for the show as a whole), Davies asked him to collaborate on the remainder of the spin-off in 2023. The two split writing duties across the programme, with Davies writing the finale in addition to his existing opening script, and McTighe the second, third and fourth episodes; Davies initially stated he had co-written the fourth with McTighe, but was subsequently not co-credited in the episode itself. Following filming wrapping on series 15 of Doctor Who, the first read-through for all five episodes occurred on 19 August 2024.

=== Filming ===
All episodes were produced in one block, compared to the two to three blocks that would usually be used for five episodes. Location shooting began on 29 August 2024 in Barry and Atlantic Wharf, both in south Wales. Filming continued into September at The Wave pool in Bristol and various locations across Wales, including at the Welsh Government Building, City Arms pub, Hodge House, and Merthyr Mawr. In October, the series was spotted filming at Cardiff City Hall, National Museum Cardiff, and the Bristol Amphitheatre. November filming occurred at Town Bridge in Newport, Wales. Some recording took place internationally, including on Mallorca, in New York, and on the RRS James Cook. Filming concluded on 9 December 2024 at the Pinewood Studios Underwater Stage in Buckinghamshire.

=== Music ===
On 30 May 2025, it was announced that Lorne Balfe had been hired as the show's composer. Additional music was provided by Joe Wilson Davies, Jeremy Earnest, Taran Mitchell, and Jack Roberts.

A soundtrack album of Balfe's score was released digitally on 5 December 2025. The first track from the album, "Barclay's Theme", was released as a digital single 28 November 2025 and a cover of "'Heroes'" by Alison Goldfrapp and Balfe was released as a single on 12 December 2025 by Goldfrapp's label A.G. Records. A CD edition was released on 30 January 2026.

The War Between the Land and the Sea

Soundtrack album by Lorne Balfe
- Released: 5 December 2025 (digital); 30 January 2026 (CD)
- Genre: Soundtrack
- Length: 51:19
- Label: Silva Screen

Singles from The War Between the Land and the Sea
- 1. "Barclay's Theme" Released: 28 November 2025; 2. "'Heroes'" Released: 12 December 2025

All tracks are written by Lorne Balfe, except where noted.

No.	Title	Length
1.	"Barclay’s Theme"	3:30
2.	"Aqua"	4:31
3.	"The Mistake"	2:20
4.	"Mission Launch"	3:40
5.	"Into the Unknown"	2:43
6.	"All over the World"	2:31
7.	"Negotiations"	1:23
8.	"Welcome our Guests"	4:21
9.	"Weight of the World"	1:30
10.	"Descending"	2:24
11.	"Aqua Den"	2:51
12.	"Prisoner of War"	3:04
13.	"Lawless"	2:27
14.	"Calling for Her"	2:45
15.	"Survivor"	3:06
16.	"Terrified of You"	2:52
17.	"'Heroes'" (David Bowie, Brian Eno, performed by Alison Goldfrapp & Balfe)	5:21
Total length:		51:19

== Release ==
The series premiered on BBC One and BBC iPlayer in the United Kingdom on 7 December 2025, and is expected to stream on Disney+ internationally in 2026.

== Reception ==
=== Ratings ===
No.	Title	Air date	Overnight ratings	Consolidated ratings		Total viewers (millions)	28-day viewers (millions)	Ref(s)
No.	Title	Air date	Viewers (millions)	Viewers (millions)	Rank	Total viewers (millions)	28-day viewers (millions)	Ref(s)
1	"Homo Aqua"	7 December 2025	2.82	1.49	14	4.31	6.07	
2	"Plastic Apocalypse"	7 December 2025	2.05	1.51	22	3.56	5.08	
3	"The Deep"	14 December 2025	2.45	1.26	12	3.71	4.67	
4	"The Witch of the Waterfall"	14 December 2025	1.70	1.5	33	3.20	4.47	
5	"The End of the War"	21 December 2025	1.79	1.29	27	3.08	3.84	

=== Critical response ===
On the review aggregator website Rotten Tomatoes, 86% of 14 critics' reviews are positive. The website's consensus reads: "The War Between the Land and the Sea is a proper Doctor Who spin-off of climatological proportions with enough verve to satisfy sci-fi enthusiasts and kids alike." The critical reception of the opening two episodes was summarised by Martin Belam in The Guardian as "mixed". Ed Power of The Independent criticised the inclusion of UNIT as a primary presence in the show, saying that "it's always been a rule of thumb that the more UNIT in an episode, the more boring the results". Power remarked that this was the case for The War Between the Land and the Sea and awarded 2 out of 5 stars. Writing for The Guardian, Lucy Mangan gave 3 out of 5, feeling that the spin-off was "an opportunity wasted", comparing it in an inferior light to Russell T Davies' previous show, Years and Years. Several outlets praised the performance of returning actress Jemma Redgrave, including Radio Times, SciFi Pulse and The London Standard. Isobel Lewis, writing for The i Paper, compared the show to Torchwood, highlighting the use of profanity. Lewis praised Davies' "willingness" to "not simply feed fans the same stories over and over", noting how the finales featuring Ncuti Gatwa's Fifteenth Doctor often "struggled to stick the landing".

In a review for the third and fourth episodes, David Opie of Digital Spy criticised the unsubstantial build-up of the relationship between Kate Lethbridge-Stewart and Colonel Cristofer Ibrahim, arguing "if you're going to pull off a stunt like this, you need to invest more time in the relationship before it's ripped apart." Louise Griffin, writing for Radio Times, concluded that the sacrifice of Ibrahim allowed for Stewart to "shine on her own", beyond only "carrying the legacy of the Brigadier." The connection between Barclay and Salt was described by Ruchika Bhat of Digital Mafia Talkies as the show exiting Doctor Who territory and entering into "sappy romance territory", with the different elements feeling incomplete and "such complicated themes in such a short span of time" seeming "a little bit ridiculous." Bhat praised the visual effects and Gugu Mbatha-Raw's performance however.

Writing for Voice Magazine, Kieran Battams compared the conclusion to Barclay's story as a reversal of The Shape of Water, whilst giving praise to Redgrave's multi-layered performance. Gizmodo writer James Whitbrook criticised what he felt was a rushed story, feeling Barclay and Salt's relationship was not "really given any time to develop", and despite the war being mentioned in name "we never get to really see that conflict." Soap Central writer Deanna Dsilver highlighted that The War Between was "easy to follow", with The End of the War "keeping that trend".
