= London Arts Orchestra =

London Arts Orchestra (LAO) is a UK-based symphony orchestra devoted to cross-arts performance. It was founded in 2009 by Edward Farmer and David Williams. David stepped down from his role as a conductor in 2012 and now assumes the position of chairman for the orchestra. LAO's concerts feature artists, dancers, actors, comedians, designers and talented young professionals from London's music conservatoires. The orchestra explores new ways of presenting classical music.

The London Arts Orchestra is a registered charity in the UK and the orchestra in residence at Christ Church Spitalfields in London, England.

On 2 February 2014, LAO collaborated with actor and director Zubin Varla on 'My Time Will Come...' an exploration of Mahler's Symphony No. 1 at Christ Church Spitalfields. Seen and Heard International described the performance, saying 'if only some of our bigger national orchestras were as innovative'.

In December 2014, London Arts Orchestra announced there upcoming project, A Symphony on Stage, in collaboration with Rough Fiction theatre company.
