= Owain Rhys Davies =

Welsh actor (1982–2026)

- Born: 20 February 1982; Cardiff, Wales
- Died: 27 May 2026 (aged 44)
- Education: Liverpool Institute for Performing Arts
- Occupations: Film, stage and television actor
- Years active: 2003–2026

Owain Rhys Davies (20 February 1982 – 27 May 2026) was a Welsh film, stage and television actor. He was best known for playing the recurring role of FBI Agent Wilson in the third season of the American horror drama television series Twin Peaks.

== Life and career ==
Davies was born in Cardiff, the son of Helen Davies. At the age of nine, he and his family moved to St Clears in Carmarthenshire. He attended and graduated from Bro Myrddin Welsh Comprehensive School. After graduating, he attended the Liverpool Institute for Performing Arts, earning his BA degree in acting, which after earning his degree, he studied at the American Academy of Dramatic Arts. He began his stage career in 2003, appearing in the jukebox musical play Mamma Mia! at the Prince Edward Theatre. He appeared in such other plays as The Wizard of Oz, The Lion King, Something Rotten! and Grease.

Davies began his screen career in 2006, appearing in the S4C drama television series Cowbois ac Injans. He guest-starred in television programs including The OA, Tall Tales and My Dead Ex, and played the recurring role of FBI Agent Wilson in the third season of the Showtime horror drama television series Twin Peaks. He also appeared in the films Alice Through the Looking Glass, Viking Siege, The Relationtrip and A Serial Killer's Guide to Life.

In 2020, Davies last screen role was in the television film The Real Founding Fathers of America, playing Alexander Hamilton. In 2024, he starred as the drag queen Candince in the musical play Grindr Help Desk. In 2026, he retired from acting.

== Death and tributes ==
Davies died on 27 May 2026, at the age of 44.

Actress Joanne Froggatt paid tribute to Davies, stating: "No words seem to convey my emotions. I am so incredibly sorry for your loss and the grief you must be feeling. I am just devastated to lose our beautiful friend, he was more than a friend, he was joy, and life and talent and kindness and fun and intelligence, has was everything, and my brain can't compute that we don’t get to hug him again". Actress Ruth Connell also paid tribute to Davies in an Instagram post.
