= A Serial Killer's Guide to Life =

2019 film written and directed by Staten Cousins Roe

- Poster
- Directed by: Staten Cousins Roe
- Written by: Staten Cousins Roe
- Produced by: Giles Alderson; Poppy Roe; Staten Cousins Roe; Charity Wakefield
- Starring: Katie Brayben; Poppy Roe; Ben Lloyd-Hughes; Sarah Ball
- Cinematography: James Layton
- Edited by: Poppy Roe; Staten Cousins Roe
- Music by: Laurence Love Greed
- Production company: Forward Motion Pictures
- Distributed by: Arrow Films
- Release dates: 24 August 2019 (London FrightFest Film Festival); 13 January 2020 (United Kingdom)
- Running time: 81 minutes
- Country: United Kingdom
- Language: English

A Serial Killer's Guide to Life is a 2019 British satirical horror road film written, directed, co-produced and co-edited by Staten Cousins Roe in his feature-length directorial debut. It stars Katie Brayben, Poppy Roe, Ben Lloyd-Hughes, Sarah Ball and others.

After premiering at film festivals in 2019, A Serial Killer's Guide to Life was released by Arrow Films to digital media / video on demand on 13 January 2020, including the streaming channels Amazon Prime and Hulu and the cable channel Showtime. The film received favorable reviews.

== Plot ==
Lou Farnt is a meek young Englishwoman with poor self-esteem, who is emotionally browbeaten by her harsh and demanding mother, with whom she lives. Wanting something better, Lou follows the teachings of various self-help gurus, but especially that of Chuck Knoah. At a different self-help guru's lecture, Lou sees a middle-aged women who strikes her attention. But when she looks again, the woman is gone. She later meets the woman, who introduces herself as Val Stone, a self-help teacher who believes she would be perfect for Lou. A day later, at Val's invitation, Lou visits her at a caravan park. There, Val describes a road trip of discovery she is taking the next day, and insinuates that Lou should join her. Despite being flattered by the attention, Lou initially can't bring herself to leave home for an extended time for the first time. But her mother's emotional abusiveness changes her mind. The next day, Lou leaves with Val in a car, for the purpose of visiting various types of self-help gurus for research. A radio briefly mentions that a woman has been found murdered at a caravan park.

With Lou periodically leaving voicemails to let her mom know she is alright, they make their first stop at a wilderness retreat led by Ben. After engaging in some activities such as tree hugging, pitching camping tests and listening to one of the three other attendees provide evening entertainment by singing a song in Welsh, they all turn in. The next morning, Val hurries Lou to leave. After they do so, we see the dead bodies of Ben and the attendees, their heads bashed in.

The next stop is a "sonic vibration" retreat, where Lou and Val are the only two attendees of the husband-and-wife couple who run it at their large house. The following morning, Val stabs the wife to death, with Lou witnessing the aftermath. The husband stumbles onto the scene and tries to escape into the yard, but Val, wielding the knife, catches him. The two struggle, and Val is being overpowered when Lou kills the husband. Lou and Val leave their car behind and take the couple's minivan.

As radio news begins reporting about the murders, Lou has Val pull over in order to throw-up in a field. Val goes to her, and Lou angrily wrestles with her and puts Val in a chokehold. Val urges Lou to kill her. But Lou cannot, and the two lay exhausted in the field. Val calls Lou the best student she's ever had.

They visit a laugh-therapy workshop and murder the members. Then during a visit to a birth-memory guru, and while Val waits in the hall, Lou begins to hallucinate. She has a memory of herself killing her mother before leaving on this trip, with the image intercutting with that of Val murdering her mother.

The two finally arrive at Chuck Knoah's estate. They find him a pathetic wreck, going through a terrible divorce and about to be dropped by his publisher for having no new book ideas. Ironically, once Knoah realizes these are the two serial killers on the news, he says his publisher would just love their memoirs, and is on a phone call arranging a meeting when Val shoots him in the head. Lou stabs Val, who earlier had called the police in an attempt to frame Lou and escape. A gun-wielding Val chases Lou to the edge of a cliff, and there they have a final meeting-of-the-minds as police sirens and a helicopter close in. Val is stabbed by Lou and then Lou stabs herself and the two fall on the grass. But moments later, when police arrive, Val seems to have vanished. The film ends with a repeat of the opening scene of Lou, walking outdoors, wearing earbuds and listening to a recorded Knoah lecture.

== Cast ==
- Katie Brayben as Lou Farnt
- Poppy Roe as Val Stern
- Ben Lloyd-Hughes as Chuck Knoah
- Sarah Ball as Lou's mother
- Sian Clifford as Cynthia
- David Newman as Barry Withnott
- Tomiwa Edun as Ben
- Fiona Glascott as Sharon Deliver-Brant
- Sinead Matthews as Izzy
- David Manson as Ralph
- Owain Rhys Davies as Marcus

== Production ==
In 2013, Poppy Roe and her husband, Staten Cousins Roe, made a darkly comic short film, This Way Out, about a euthanasia clinic doing what it could to get more clients. Poppy Roe and her drama-school schoolmate Katie Brayben starred. The short attracted positive attention and sales, and the filmmakers in January 2017 did a crowdfunding campaign for a feature film they originally titled Self-Help.

The film, eventually titled A Serial Killer's Guide to Life, shot for two weeks across 28 locations in Brighton and Sussex, England.

Poppy Roe stated,

Shooting on a ridiculously tight budget meant problem solving continuously. Our DoP, James Layton, helped source our camera. Sony generously agreed to let us use their F55 (the one used on The Crown), and many location owners gave heavy discounts – to help support a local, independent film. It was a fast and furious shoot, often getting one take and moving on. ... I found myself a mentor in Colin Goudie (editor of Monsters and Rogue One: A Star Wars Story), who I met on an editing workshop he spoke at. Colin encouraged me after watching a rough cut, giving some golden advice.... We also kindly got edit notes from Julian Doyle (editor of Brazil, and Monty Python and the Holy Grail), which supported the comic timing beautifully.

A trailer was released in January 2020.

== Release ==
After premiering at the London FrightFest Film Festival on 24 August 2019, it later played at such festivals as England's Grimmfest: Manchester's International Festival of Fantastic Film and Fantastic Film Festival Australia. Picked up by Arrow Films for commercial distribution, it was released to digital media / video on demand in the US, Canada, and the UK on 13 January 2020, including the streaming channels Amazon Prime and Hulu and the cable channel Showtime.

== Reception ==
A Serial Killer's Guide to Life holds a 92% approval rating on review aggregator website Rotten Tomatoes, based on 13 reviews.

Lorry Kikta of Film Threat wrote "[a] bone-dry dark horror-comedy, A Serial Killer’s Guide to Life, is I Heart Huckabees meets American Psycho by way of Thelma and Louise." James Perkins of Starburst wrote "Satire is very difficult to do - especially when trying to find the balance of telling an interesting story and also being respectful to anyone affected by the source material. A Serial Killer's Guide to Life accomplishes this task tenfold and is one of the funniest and most original British films in a long time."

However, while Sep Gohrdani of the UK magazine VultureHound called it "an engaging, sharp, witty and darkly fun black comedy," he said it "doesn't quite live up to its full potential" because it "never manages to take the concept to the next level, and thus it remains watchable without being remarkable." Bryan Yentz of Rue Morgue felt the same way. He liked its "darkly humorous tone" that "nails the self-indulged attitudes and attributes of many a life-coaching element," and he "appreciated the dry tone and believable delivery from each actress, as well as the surrounding cast," but felt that, "The idea is a one-trick pony that doesn't truly evolve the premise beyond what's expected and becomes a rinse/repeat of therapeutic slayings that are visually stifled by repetitive cutaways and (sometimes) after-imagery of a corpse." He complimented "its two fantastic leads, Katie Brayben and Poppy Roe."

Commenting on the musical score, Josh Sandy of The Mancunion, the University of Manchester student newspaper, said it "is packed full of orchestral pieces. Whilst this may be a slightly unorthodox choice, the increasingly discordant and erratic music provides the ideal accompaniment to Lou's rapidly deteriorating mental state."

=== Accolades ===
The film's writer-director, Staten Cousins Roe, was nominated for the 2019 FrightFest Screen Genre Rising Star Award.
