= Jamie Zubairi =

Anglo-Malay actor, writer and artist

- Born: August 19, 1972 (age 53); Aldershot, England
- Education: London Academy of Music and Dramatic Art; De Montfort University
- Occupations: Actor, writer, artist
- Years active: 1997–present
- Website: Official website

Jamie Zubairi (born 19 August 1972) is an English-Malaysian actor, writer and artist. He started his acting career working on the BBC television series Grange Hill and has appeared on numerous television shows including Cucumber and Holby City, on radio as Inspector Chen in Qiu Xiaolong's Inspector Chen detective series, as well as being a prolific stage performer and writer.

== Early life and education ==
Jamie Zubairi was born in Aldershot, England in 1972 to an English mother and a Malaysian father. From 1973, Zubairi was brought up in Klang, Malaysia, but returned to England in his teenage years. Zubairi was educated at Rutland Sixth Form College and then studied Art Foundation at the De Montfort University in Leicester, England. Zubairi trained to be an actor at LAMDA, graduating in 1997.

== Career ==
Zubairi has performed in many stage productions. In 2010, he wrote and starred in Skylarking at the North Devon Festival and appeared in Wolf at the Edinburgh Festival Fringe. The next year, Zubairi played the father in Yellow Earth's Why The Lion Danced and made his New York stage debut at the 59E59 Theaters in George Orwell's Burmese Days. In 2012, he performed in You Me Bum Bum Train, Mozart's Abduction From The Seraglio, These Associations at Tate Modern by Tino Sehgal and performed his one-man mixed-media project Unbroken Line at the Oval House Theatre. In 2014 Zubairi co-wrote, co-produced and performed in Expectations. He has appeared as Dr. Rank in A Doll's House and in Parliament Square at the Royal Exchange Theatre.

In 2015, Zubairi appeared as Max in three episodes of Russell T Davies' Cucumber. In 2017, the feature film Tides was released. It stars Zubairi, but is notable for also being his first screenwriting credit. Tides had its World Premiere at the BFI London Film Festival and released nationwide in 2018. In 2018, Zubairi appeared in Witness for the Prosecution at County Hall, London.

In 2021, Zubairi appeared as Dorje Lingpa in the seventh series of Doctor Who: The Early Adventures.

In March 2022, Zubairi starred as Kenneth Williams in Diary of a Somebody, which was performed at the Seven Dials Playhouse, London. In June 2022, Zubairi starred as Kuzinov in In The Weeds. The play, set on a Hebridean island, was performed at the Ustinov Studio in Bath and rated 3/5 stars by The Stage. In November 2022, Zubairi appeared in the play Guy Fawkes as Kit Wright, performing at the York Theatre Royal. Jessie Burchett, writing for The Yorker praised Zubairi, writing that he "inject[ed] a welcome dose of pantomime energy".

Zubairi starred as Three and Petko in the BBC audiobook for Doctor Who: The Eighth Doctor Adventures: Connections, due for release in December 2022. Zubairi features alongside Nicola Walker and Paul McGann.

In May 2024, Zubairi starred in When the Mountains Meet, a stage show touring Scotland. In the last quarter of 2024, Zubairi appeared as Mr Krish in the play The Elephant in the Room, which was performed at Waterloo East Theatre, London.

On 14 February 2025, Zubairi was featured on "Hometown Pride" - a collaboration between the Thamesmead Community Choir and fellow Thamesmead-based artists J Cocoa, Kei the Artist and Jules. The track was funded by Arts Council England. The group had performed to an audience of more than 6000 on the main stage at Thamesmead Festival in Southmere Park in August 2024. From March 2025, Zubairi appeared as Hiroshi in the West End production of My Neighbour Totoro for a 34-week run, which was later extended to March 2026.

== Acting credits ==
=== Film ===
Year	Title	Role	Notes
2002	Between the Wars	Video seller	Short film
2008	Out of Milk	Narrator	Short film
2008	How I Learned to Love Richard Here	Max	Short film
2015	Starship Goldfish	Emby	Voice only
2017	Tides	Zooby	Feature film; Also co-writer
2017	Sleep	Santi	Short film
2019	Strange Cities Are Familiar	Theo	Short film
2021	Time Family	William / Damien / Jesus	Short film

=== Television ===
Year	Title	Role	Notes
2001	Grange Hill	Steve Jones	4 episodes in Series 24
2001	Married/Unmarried	Dance Recital Audience	
2005	Will & Grace commercial idents		Sponsored by Maltesers
2010	Holby City	Harvey Posner	3 episodes
2012	Cuckoo	John	Episode: "The Wedding"
2015	Cucumber	Max	3 episodes
2017	Silent Witness	Jason Bradwell	Series 20, "Covenants" Parts 1 and 2
2018	EastEnders	Dr. Daniel Zainuddin	Episode dated 8 November 2018
2020	#SketchPack		Episode: "Light Bulb Moments"

=== Theatre ===
Year	Title	Role	Venue	Notes
1997	Hansel & Gretel	Montresor	Theatre Royal Stratford East	
2007	The Letter		Wyndham's Theatre	
2009	Skylarking		Area 10, Peckham	Also writer, director
2010	Skylarking		North Devon Festival	Also writer, director
2010	Wolf		Edinburgh Festival Fringe	
2011	Why The Lion Danced	The Father		
2011	Burmese Days	John Flory/U Po Kyin	59E59 Theaters, New York City	
2012	You Me Bum Bum Train	The MC		
2012	Abduction From The Seraglio	The Pasha		
2012	These Associations	Associate	Tate Modern	
2012	Unbroken Line	Dolah	Ovalhouse Theatre	
2016	A Doll's House	Dr. Rank		
2018	Witness for the Prosecution		County Hall, London	
2022	Diary of a Somebody	Kenneth Williams	Seven Dials Playhouse	
2022	In The Weeds	Kazumi Fujimoto	Ustinov Studio	
2022	Guy Fawkes	Kit Wright	York Theatre Royal	
2024	When the Mountains Meet		Scotland tour	
2024	The Elephant in the Room	Mr Krish	Waterloo East Theatre	
2025-2026	My Neighbour Totoro	Hiroshi	Gillian Lynne Theatre,	RSC debut

=== Audiobooks ===
Year	Title	Role	Notes
2018	Inspector Chen Mysteries	Inspector Chen	Voiceover
2021	Doctor Who: The Early Adventures	Dorje Lingpa	Voiceover
2022	Doctor Who: The Eighth Doctor Adventures: Connections	Three/Petko	Voiceover
2024	The Death and Life of River Song	Peevy / Com-Tech 2	4 episodes

=== Music videos ===
Year	Artist	Title	Role
2014	Chrissie Hynde	"Adding the Blue"	Painter

=== Video games ===
Year	Title	Role	Notes
2010	James Bond 007: Blood Stone	Additional voices	Voiceover
2010	Just Cause 2	Radio Announcer	Voiceover
2017	Dragon Quest XI: Echoes of an Elusive Age	Ryu / Additional Voices (English version)	Voiceover
2018	Vampyr	Rakesh	Voiceover
2019	Total War: Three Kingdoms	Cao Cao	Voiceover
