= Tammy Faye (musical) =

Stage musical by Elton John and Jake Shears

- Original London production poster
- Music: Elton John
- Lyrics: Jake Shears
- Book: James Graham
- Basis: The life of Tammy Faye Bakker
- Premiere: 13 October 2022: Almeida Theatre, London
- Productions: 2022 London; 2024 Broadway

Tammy Faye is a biographic stage musical with music by Elton John, lyrics by Jake Shears and a book by James Graham, based on the life of Tammy Faye Bakker.

== Production history ==
=== London (2022) ===
Tammy Faye had its world premiere production at the Almeida Theatre in London, previewing from October 13, 2022 (with an official press night on October 26) running until December 2. The production was due to close on December 3, however due to illness in the cast the final performances were cancelled. The production was directed by the Almeida's artistic director Rupert Goold with choreography by Lynne Page, design by Bunny Christie, costume design by Katrina Lindsay and lighting design by Neil Austin and produced by Joseph Smith

The cast included Katie Brayben as Tammy Faye Bakker and Andrew Rannells as Jim Bakker.

=== Broadway (2024) ===
In November 2023, it was announced that the show would transfer to Broadway during the 2024–25 season. On the red carpet at the 2024 Tony Awards, Andrew Rannells revealed that he would no longer be going to Broadway with the show, due to failed contract negotiations. On June 26, it was announced Christian Borle would be taking over the role of Jim Bakker. One month later, Michael Cerveris joined the cast as Jerry Falwell.

The show began previews on 19 October 2024, with an opening night on 14 November at the newly renovated Palace Theatre. Katie Brayben reprised her role. On November 19, it was announced that the show would close on December 8, after receiving negative reviews and poor ticket sales, losing $25 million throughout its run. The show played 24 preview performances and 29 regular performances.

== Cast and characters ==
Character	London (2022)	Broadway (2024)
Tammy Faye Bakker	Katie Brayben	Katie Brayben
Jim Bakker	Andrew Rannells	Christian Borle
Jerry Falwell	Zubin Varla	Michael Cerveris
Oral Roberts / Reggie / Steve Pieters / Charles Shepherd	Ashley Campbell	Charl Brown
Billy Graham / Larry Flint / Pontius Pilate / Judge	Peter Caulfield	Mark Evans
Paul Crouch / Ally the Alligator / Colonel Sanders	Richard Dempsey	Nick Bailey
Ted Turner / Pat Robertson / The Pope	Nicholas Rowe	Andy Taylor
Jimmy Swaggart / Archbishop of Canterbury / Ronald Reagan	Steve John Shepherd	Ian Lassiter
Jan Crouch / Susie Moppet / Lori Beth	Amy Booth-Steel	Allison Guinn
John Fletcher	Martin Sarreal	Raymond J. Lee
Nurse / Receptionist / Announcer / Jessica Hahn	Gemma Sutton	Alana Pollard

== Musical numbers ==
Act I

- "Prologue" - Tammy Faye, Worshippers
- "It's Light of the World" - Billy Graham, Full Company
- "If Only Love" - Tammy Faye, Jim Bakker
- "PTL TV Theme" - PTL Members
- "Open Hands/Right Kind of Faith" - Tammy Faye
- "He's Inside Me" - Tammy Faye, Jim Bakker, Jan Crouch, Paul Crouch, Full Company
- "Satellite of God" - Jerry Falwell
- "God's House/Heritage USA" - Jim Bakker, Full Company
- "Empty Hands" - Tammy Faye, Full Company

Act II

- "In My Prime Time" - Tammy Faye, PTL Members
- "Don't Let There Be Light" - Tammy Faye, Jim Bakker, Jerry Falwell, Full Company
- "The Right Kind of Faith (Reprise)" - Tammy Faye, Jim Bakker, PTL Members
- "Promised Me" - Tammy Faye, Jim Bakker, Jerry Falweel, Jessica Hahn, PTL Members
- "Bring Me the Face of Tammy Bakker" - Tammy Faye, PTL Members
- "God's House (Reprise)" - Paul Crouch, Jan Crouch
- "Look How Far We've Fallen" - Preachers
- "Look How Far We've Fallen (Reprise)" - Tammy Faye, Jim Bakker
- "If You Came To See Me Cry" - Tammy Faye, Full Company
- "See You In Heaven" - Full Company

== Critical reception ==
The Almeida Theatre production received positive reviews from audiences and critics including four star reviews from The Guardian, Time Out, The Independent, Financial Times, WhatsOnStage, and The Sunday Times.

In its review of the Broadway production, The New York Times called the show "disjointed, strangely bland." Variety's Frank Rizzo said the Broadway production lacked "any sense of confidence, consistency or purpose. It’s as messy as Tammy’s mascara."

== Awards ==
=== Original London production ===
Year	Award	Category	Nominee	Result
2023	Evening Standard Awards	Best Musical		Nominated
2023	Laurence Olivier Awards	Best New Musical		Nominated
2023	Laurence Olivier Awards	Best Actress in a Musical	Katie Brayben	Won
2023	Laurence Olivier Awards	Best Actor in a Musical	Andrew Rannells	Nominated
2023	Laurence Olivier Awards	Best Actor in a Supporting Role in a Musical	Zubin Varla	Won
