= Katie Brayben =

English actress and musician

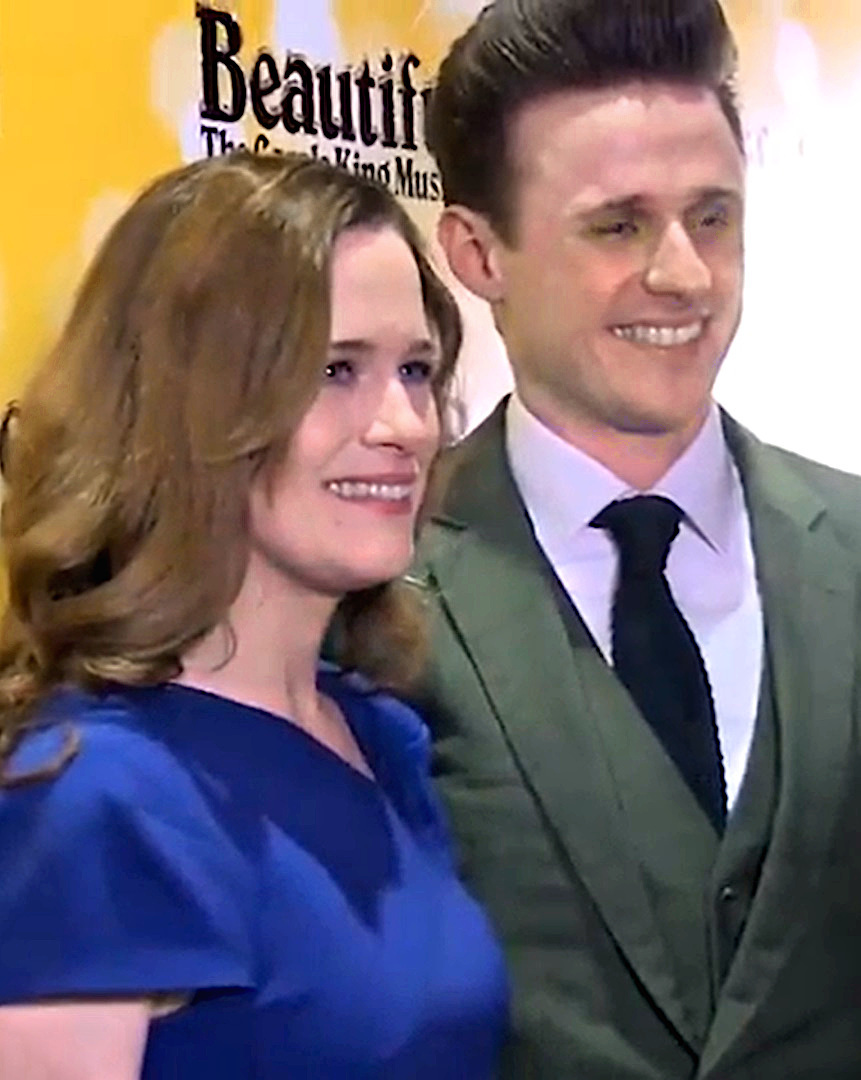
Katie Brayben with Alan Morrissey in 2015

Katie Brayben (born 3 September) is an English actress and musician who has performed in stage plays, television and musicals and also as a singer and songwriter with her own music. She is presently best known for her portrayal of the title role of Carole King in the London production of Beautiful: The Carole King Musical, for which she won the Laurence Olivier Award for Best Actress in a Musical at the 2015 Laurence Olivier Awards. She won her second Olivier award in the same category at the 2023 Laurence Olivier Awards for her performance as the title role in Tammy Faye.

== Biography ==
Brayben is an English actress, singer and musician who also performs as an original songwriter playing piano and guitar. Born Katie Burke, her parents being London blues-based performers Mick (Mike) Burke and Frances (Fran) McGillivray, she was raised in a musical household in the London borough of Lewisham; her sister Jo Burke is also a folk music performer (singer and violinist). She studied at the Rose Bruford College of Theatre and Performance, from which she graduated with a Bachelor of Arts in 2003. In an interview, she has stated that she chose to use a different surname than her birth name for her professional career to avoid potential confusion with the already established London born actress Kathy Burke.

She made her West End debut when she took over the lead role of Sophie in the 10th anniversary production of Mamma Mia! and later starred opposite Matt Smith in the American Psycho musical. In 2014 she joined the production of Mike Bartlett's King Charles III playing Princess Diana, and moved with the show when it transferred from the Almeida Theatre to the West End. In 2015 when that show moved to Broadway, she took on the title role of Carole King in the London production of Beautiful: The Carole King Musical. Her performance won the Laurence Olivier Award for Best Actress in a Musical.

2022 saw Katie Brayben re-team with American Psycho and King Charles III director Rupert Goold at the Almeida for the new biographic stage musical Tammy Faye. With Brayben in the title role of the queer icon, the show explored her life with lyrics by Jake Shears and music by Sir Elton John. The production would go on to receive four nominations at this year's Laurence Olivier Awards, where Katie would receive her second Laurence Olivier Award for Best Actress in a Musical. Brayben reprised the role for the show's short-lived transfer to Broadway in 2024.

In the summer of 2025, she revisited her role in Girl from the North Country during a limited engagement run at the The Old Vic. She played the Baker's Wife in the Bridge Theatre's production of Into the Woods later that year, which would earn her another Olivier nomination for Best Actress.

== Filmography ==
Year	Title	Role	Notes
2015	Vera	Sally	Episode - "Changing Tides"
2017	Doctor Who	Ellie	Episode - "Oxygen"
2017	King Charles III	Diana, Princess of Wales	TV movie
2019	Luther	Penny Leyton	2 Episodes
2019	A Serial Killer's Guide to Life	Lou Farnt	also Associate Producer
2021, 2025	The Wheel of Time	Latra Posae Decume	2 episodes
2022	Miss Scarlet and The Duke	Alice Lee	Episode - "Pandora's Box"
2023	Queen Charlotte: A Bridgerton Story	Lady Vivian Ledger	2 episodes

== Stage ==
Year	Title	Role	Notes
2005	Some Girls Are Bigger Than Others		Lyric Hammersmith
2006-2007	Mamma Mia!	Sophie	UK Tour
2009	Mamma Mia (10th Anniversary)	Sophie	West End
2011	Company	April	Southwark Playhouse
2012	Ragtime	Evelyn Nesbitt	Regent's Park Open Air Theatre
2013–14	American Psycho	Courtney Lawrence	Almeida Theatre
2014	King Charles III	Diana, Princess of Wales	Almeida Theatre / West End
2015	Beautiful: The Carole King Musical	Carole King	Aldwych Theatre
2015	The Iliad		Almeida Theatre
2016	My Mother Said I Never Should	Jackie	St. James Theatre
2016	The Spoils	Sarah	Trafalgar Studios
2018	A Walk on the Moon	Pearl Kantrowitz	American Conservatory Theater
2018	Honour	Claudia	The Park Theatre
2019	Girl from the North Country	Elizabeth Laine	Gielgud Theatre
2020	Nine Lessons and Carols: stories for a long winter		Almeida Theatre
2022	Tammy Faye	Tammy Faye	Almeida Theatre
2024	Tammy Faye	Tammy Faye	Palace Theatre
2025	Girl from the North Country	Elizabeth Laine	The Old Vic
2025-26	Into the Woods	The Baker's Wife	Bridge Theatre
