= Turbine Theatre =

Theatre in Battersea, London, England

Coordinates: 51.4832°N 0.1470°W

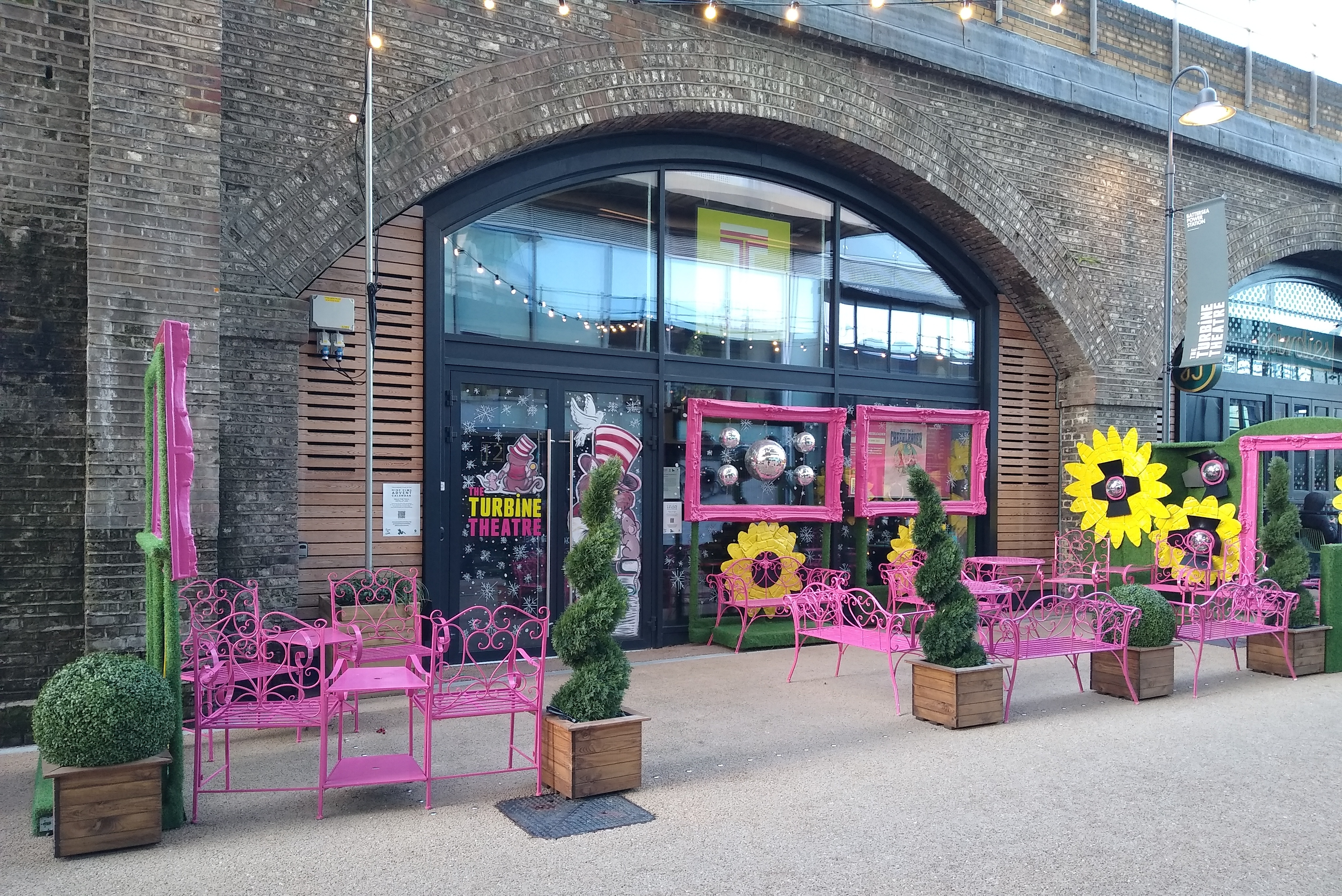
- Interactive map of Turbine Theatre
- Address: Arches Lane, Circus West Village; London, SW11 8AB; United Kingdom
- Operator: Battersea Power Station Development Company
- Capacity: 94
- Type: Commercial producing theatre

Construction
- Opened: 6 September 2019; 6 years ago
- Closed: 22 December 2024; 20 months ago
- Years active: 2019–2024

Website
- www.theturbinetheatre.com

The Turbine Theatre was a commercial theatre on the banks of the River Thames at Battersea in the London Borough of Wandsworth, which opened in 2019.

The theatre was established as part of the redevelopment of Battersea Power Station. The inaugural artistic director is Paul Taylor-Mills, who was previously artistic director of Andrew Lloyd Webber's The Other Palace theatre.

The theatre has seating capacity of 94. It is located within railway arches under the Grosvenor Bridge.

The opening production was Harvey Fierstein's Torch Song Trilogy featuring Matthew Needham as Arnold, followed by High Fidelity, set in London as in Nick Hornby's original novel.

Other notable productions include My Son's a Queer (But What Can You Do?), Eugenius! and But I'm a Cheerleader.

In October 2024, Taylor-Mills announced that due to a shifting theatre landscape and various economic pressures, the Turbine Theatre would close at the culmination of the theatre's 2024-25 Christmas season.
