= My Son's a Queer (But What Can You Do?) =

2021 one-person play

- Broadway promotional poster
- Written by: Rob Madge
- Music by: Rob Madge; Pippa Cleary

Premiere
- Date: 17 June 2021
- Place: Turbine Theatre, London

My Son's A Queer (But What Can You Do?) is a one-person biographical play by Rob Madge, with music composed by Pippa Cleary and lyrics by Madge and Cleary. The show revolves around Madge's childhood videos, and the shows they used to put on in their living room for their parents.

== Premise ==
Madge aims to re-create a childhood Disney parade they put on in their living room for their parents. The show uses a large video screen to play clips of Madge's childhood performances.

== Production history ==
=== Off-West End (2021) ===
The show made its world premiere at the Turbine Theatre on 17 June 2021 for a limited run until 3 July with Madge playing themself. The production was directed by Luke Sheppard and produced by Paul Taylor Mills. The show won the 2022 WhatsOnStage Award for Best Off-West End. The playtext was published by Nick Hern Books.

=== 2021 Tour ===
Following its success at the Turbine, the show ran at the Edinburgh Fringe Festival at the Underbelly from 4 to 29 August with a run at Norwich Playhouse on 2 and 3 September 2021.

=== West End (2022, 2023, 2026) ===
During the Edinburgh run, it was announced that the show would transfer to the Garrick Theatre in London's West End from 21 October to 6 November 2022. The show later played another West End season at the Ambassadors Theatre from 25 January to 1 April 2023. The West End runs were nominated for the 2023 Laurence Olivier Award for Best Entertainment or Comedy Play. Madge won the Theatre Award at the 2023 Virgin Atlantic Attitude Awards and was a joint winner of the Best Creative West End Debut Award at The Stage Debut Awards in 2023 (as writer).

The show is set to play a return run at the Apollo Theatre in September 2026.

=== Off-Broadway (2025) ===
The show was originally supposed to begin previews at the Lyceum Theatre on Broadway in February 2024, but the production was postponed and later cancelled due to concerns from the producers over its commercial viability. Instead, it played a limited run Off-Broadway at New York City Center from 12 to 15 June 2025.

=== UK tour (2024) ===
Following the postponement of the Broadway run, the show toured the UK beginning at the Curve, Leicester from 8 to 10 July 2024 before heading to Birmingham Hippodrome (11 to 13 July), Belgrade Theatre, Coventry (15 to 17 July), Liverpool Playhouse (18 to 20 July), Derby Theatre (22 to 24 July), McEwan Hall, Edinburgh (1 to 16 August) and HOME, Manchester (19 to 25 August).

== Songs ==
The following songs are sung by Madge during the performance with lyrics written by themself and Pippa Cleary and music by Cleary. An Original Cast Recording was released on 21 October 2022 by Westway Music;

- Anything Is Possible
- Yellow Dress
- Anything Is Possible (Reprise)
- Pied Piper
- Pieces of My Heart
- A Conversation with Dad #1: A Wool Wig
- We Will Be Loved Anyway
- A Conversation with Dad #2: Passing The Baton
- Finale
- Granny Grimble's Yellow Dress

== Rob Madge's Regards to Broadway ==
Rob Madge's Regards to Broadway was a new play with songs performed and written by Madge (accompanied by Pippa Cleary) in response to the postponement of the Broadway run of My Son's a Queer (But What Can You Do?). It was performed for one night only on the 26 May 2024 at the Garrick Theatre, London, however due to popular demand a matinee performance was added.
