= Jessica Hung Han Yun =

British lighting designer

Jessica Hung Han Yun (born 1993) is a British theatrical lighting designer, known for her work in theatre, concerts, and opera productions. Hung Han Yun has won an Olivier Award, WhatsOnStage Award, Knight of illumination award and a 2020 Offie for her work.

== Early life and education ==
Hung Han Yun was born and raised in Essex, she is of Chinese Mauritian heritage and was trained at Rose Bruford College, where she graduated with a degree in lighting design in 2014.

Her inspirations are drawn from installation artists such as James Turrell and Oliafur Elliasson and the lighting designer Paule Constable.

== Career ==
In January 2022 she was listed as one of The Stage 25, as a future star in the UK theatre industry.

Hung Han Yun has designed a number of Off West End, West End and international productions, such as Equus at Theatre Royal Stratford East, Dick Whittington at The National Theatre and My Neighbour Totoro an RSC production performed at the Barbican.

== Awards and nominations ==
Year	Award	Category	Work	Result
2022	Olivier Award	Best Lighting Design	My Neighbour Totoro	Won
2022	What's on Stage Awards	Best Lighting Design	My Neighbour Totoro	Won
2020	Offie	Best Lighting Design	Equus	Won
2019	Knight of Illumination Awards	Best Lighting Design	Equus	Won
