= Midsummer Mechanicals =

2022 play

Midsummer Mechanicals is a 2022 play written by Kerry Frampton and Ben Hales. The story, a sequel to William Shakespeare's A Midsummer Night's Dream, follows the titular troupe of actors, The Mechanicals, attempting to put on a new play at the court of Duke Theseus. The work is aimed towards families and children aged 5–12, making this the first full-scale family-oriented production put on by Shakespeare's Globe.

== Production ==
Midsummer Mechanicals opened on 28 July 2022 at the Sam Wanamaker Playhouse in Shakespeare's Globe Theatre and ran until 21 August 2022. It was produced in collaboration with Shakespeare's Globe and Splendid Productions and directed by Lucy Cuthbertson and Kerry Frampton. Rose Revitt designed the show's set, and Sabia Smith provided costumes.

The show was performed at Liverpool's Shakespeare North Playhouse from 15 to 18 July 2023. Following this run, the show returned to the Sam Wanamaker Playhouse from 22 July until 26 August.

== Plot ==
=== Act l ===
A year after the events of A Midsummer Night's Dream, Peter Quince and Nick Bottom prepare for the premiere of "The Adventures of the Weaver and the Fairy Queen", a play based on Bottom's recollections of the previous year's events. Although the show is set to begin in less than an hour, all the other actors are yet to arrive. Francis Flute does arrive, but one of the actors, Tom Snout, is nowhere to be found. His wife, Patience, is willing to take on the role, but is technically unable to act as she is a woman. Besides the missing actors, Quince is also trying to write the ending of the play.

=== Act ll ===
As time runs out, the Mechanicals put on the show. Patience takes on the role of the Fairy King, and the audience take on the role of providing sound effects.

== Cast ==
	2022 Shakespeare's Globe
Peter Quince	Jamal Franklin
Nick Bottom	Kerry Frampton
Francis Flute	Sam Glen
Patience	Melody Brown

== Awards ==
Year	Award	Category	Result
2023	Laurence Olivier Awards	Best Family Show	Nominated
