= Standing at the Sky's Edge (musical) =

2019 jukebox musical by Richard Hawley

- West End production poster
- Music: Richard Hawley
- Lyrics: Richard Hawley
- Book: Chris Bush
- Basis: Three families in Park Hill estate
- Premiere: 14 March 2019: Crucible Theatre, Sheffield
- Productions: 2019 Sheffield; 2022 Sheffield; 2023 London; 2024 West End
- Awards: UK Theatre Awards; South Bank Sky Arts Award; Laurence Olivier Award for Best New Musical; Laurence Olivier Award for Best Original Score or New Orchestrations

Standing at the Sky's Edge is an Olivier Award-winning musical with music and lyrics by Richard Hawley and a book by Chris Bush.

The musical (named after Hawley's 2012 album of the same name) begins in 1961 and tells the story of three families over sixty years living in Park Hill, a council housing estate in Sheffield and features both new and existing songs by Hawley.

== Production history ==
=== Sheffield (2019) ===
The musical had its world premiere at the Crucible Theatre, Sheffield, previewing from 14 March (with a press night on 20 March) and running until 6 April 2019. The production was directed by artistic director Robert Hastie, designed by Ben Stones and choreographed by Lynne Page. The cast featured Darragh Cowley, Nicole Deon, Louis Gaunt, Adam Hugill, Robert Lonsdale, Fela Lufadeju, Maimuna Memon, Johanne Murdock, Damian Myerscough, Alastair Natkiel, Faith Omole, Deborah Tracey, Rachael Wooding and Alex Young.

=== Sheffield revival (2022-23) and National Theatre, London (2023) ===
Following the success of the 2019 production, the musical was revived at the Crucible Theatre, Sheffield, from 10 December 2022 to 21 January 2023, before transferring to the Olivier Theatre at the National Theatre, London from 9 February to 25 March 2023. The revival had been due to take place in 2020-21 but was delayed due to the COVID-19 pandemic.

The National Theatre co-production with Sheffield Theatres opened at the Olivier Theatre, London, on 9 February 2023 to favourable critical reaction.

=== West End (2024) ===
The musical transferred to London's West End at the Gillian Lynne Theatre from 8 February 2024 for an initial six-month season. In November 2023, some casting was announced. Returning to the show are Samuel Jordan as Jimmy, Baker Mukasa as George, Alastair Natkiel as Marcus, Rachael Wooding as Rose. Elizabeth Ayodele, Joel Harper-Jackson, Sharlene Hector, Mel Lowe, Laura Pitt-Pulford, and Lauryn Redding join the West End cast.

== Roles and principal casts ==
Character	Sheffield	Sheffield Revival	National Theatre	West End
Character	2019	2022	2023	2024
Harry	Robert Lonsdale	Robert Lonsdale	Robert Lonsdale	Joel Harper-Jackson
Rose	Rachael Wooding	Rachael Wooding	Rachael Wooding	Rachael Wooding
Joy	Faith Omole	Faith Omole	Faith Omole	Elizabeth Ayodele
Jimmy	Adam Hugill	Samuel Jordan	Samuel Jordan	Samuel Jordan
Poppy	Alex Young	Alex Young	Alex Young	Laura Pitt-Pulford
Nikki	Maimuna Memon	Maimuna Memon	Maimuna Memon	Lauryn Redding
Connie	Nicole Deon	Bobbie Little	Bobbie Little	Mel Lowe
Grace / Alice	Deborah Tracey	Deborah Tracey	Deborah Tracey	Sharlene Hector
George	Fela Lufadeju	Baker Mukasa	Baker Mukasa	Baker Mukasa

== Musical numbers ==
Act I

- "As The Dawn Breaks"
- "Time Is"
- "Naked in Pitsmoor"
- "I’m Looking for Someone to Find Me"
- "Tonight the Streets Are Ours"
- "Open Up Your Door"
- "My Little Treasures"
- "Coles Corner"
- "There’s a Storm A-Comin’"

Act II

- "Standing at the Sky’s Edge"
- "Our Darkness"
- "Midnight Train"
- "For Your Lover Give Some Time"
- "There’s a Storm A-Comin’ (Reprise)"
- "After the Rain"
- "Don’t Get Hung Up in Your Soul"
- "As the Dawn Breaks (Reprise)"

== Awards and nominations ==
=== 2019 Sheffield production ===
Year	Award	Category	Nominee	Result
2019	UK Theatre Awards	Best Musical Production		Won
2020	South Bank Sky Arts Award	Theatre		Won

=== 2023 London production ===
The show received eight nominations for the 2023 Olivier Awards, making it the most nominated musical of the season.

Year	Award	Category	Nominee	Result
2023	Laurence Olivier Awards	Best New Musical		Won
2023	Laurence Olivier Awards	Best Director	Robert Hastie	Nominated
2023	Laurence Olivier Awards	Best Actress in a Musical	Faith Omole	Nominated
2023	Laurence Olivier Awards	Best Actress in a Supporting Role in a Musical	Maimuna Memon	Nominated
2023	Laurence Olivier Awards	Best Theatre Choreographer	Lynne Page	Nominated
2023	Laurence Olivier Awards	Best Set Design	Ben Stones	Nominated
2023	Laurence Olivier Awards	Best Sound Design	Bobby Aitken	Nominated
2023	Laurence Olivier Awards	Best Original Score or New Orchestrations	Richard Hawley and Tom Deering	Won

== Cast recording ==
The Original Live Cast Recording was recorded over three evenings in December 2022 during the Sheffield revival and mixed at the Arch Studios, Sheffield. The recording was released on 13 February 2023 and features 17 songs.

== Adaptations ==
In February 2023 it was announced that the show would be adapted by StudioCanal's RED Production Company into a four-part television series.
