= Lauryn Redding =

British actor, writer and composer

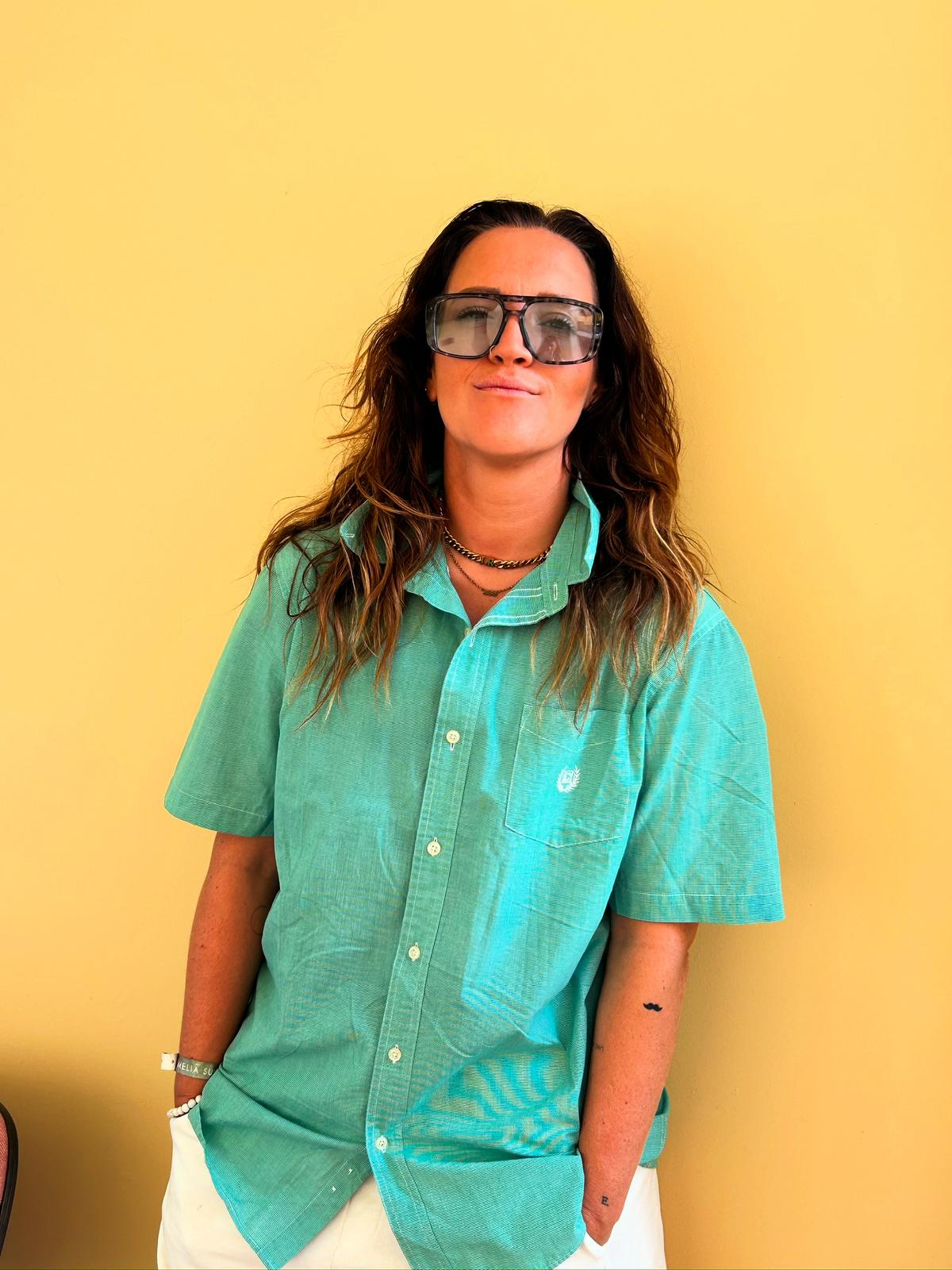
Lauryn Redding in 2026

Lauryn Redding is a British actor, writer and a composer. She received the 2024 Offie for Best Lead Performance in a Musical for her gig musical Bloody Elle at the Soho Theatre. In 2023 she was a recipient of the Peggy Ramsay/Film4 Playwrights' Scheme bursary.

Notable work as a writer includes Bloody Elle, which premiered at Royal Exchange Theatre, Manchester in 2021. It was produced at the Traverse Theatre during the 2022 Edinburgh Fringe Festival, and was produced at Soho Theatre in 2023 before transferring to the Lyric Theatre in London's West End. The script is published by Nick Hern Books.

As an actor Redding has performed in productions including Standing at the Sky's Edge at Gillian Lynn Theatre in the West End.

== Personal life ==
Redding grew up near Sheffield in Yorkshire and later studied at Rose Bruford College in London. Redding is a lesbian and uses she/they pronouns.
