= Improbable (theatre company) =

Theatre company

- Formation: 1996
- Type: Theatre group
- Artistic director(s): Lee Simpson, Phelim McDermott, and Julian Crouch
- Website: www.improbable.co.uk

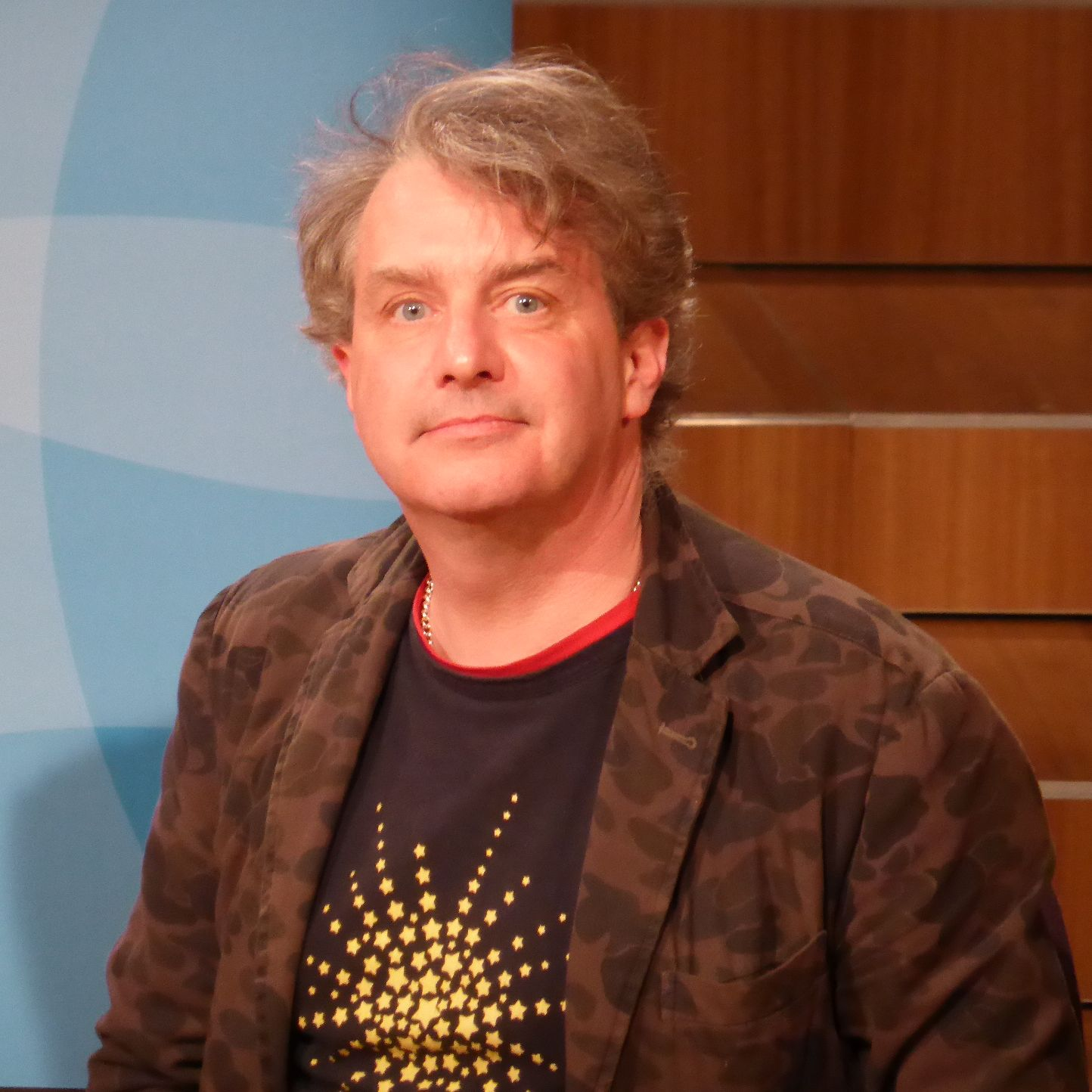
Phelim McDermott

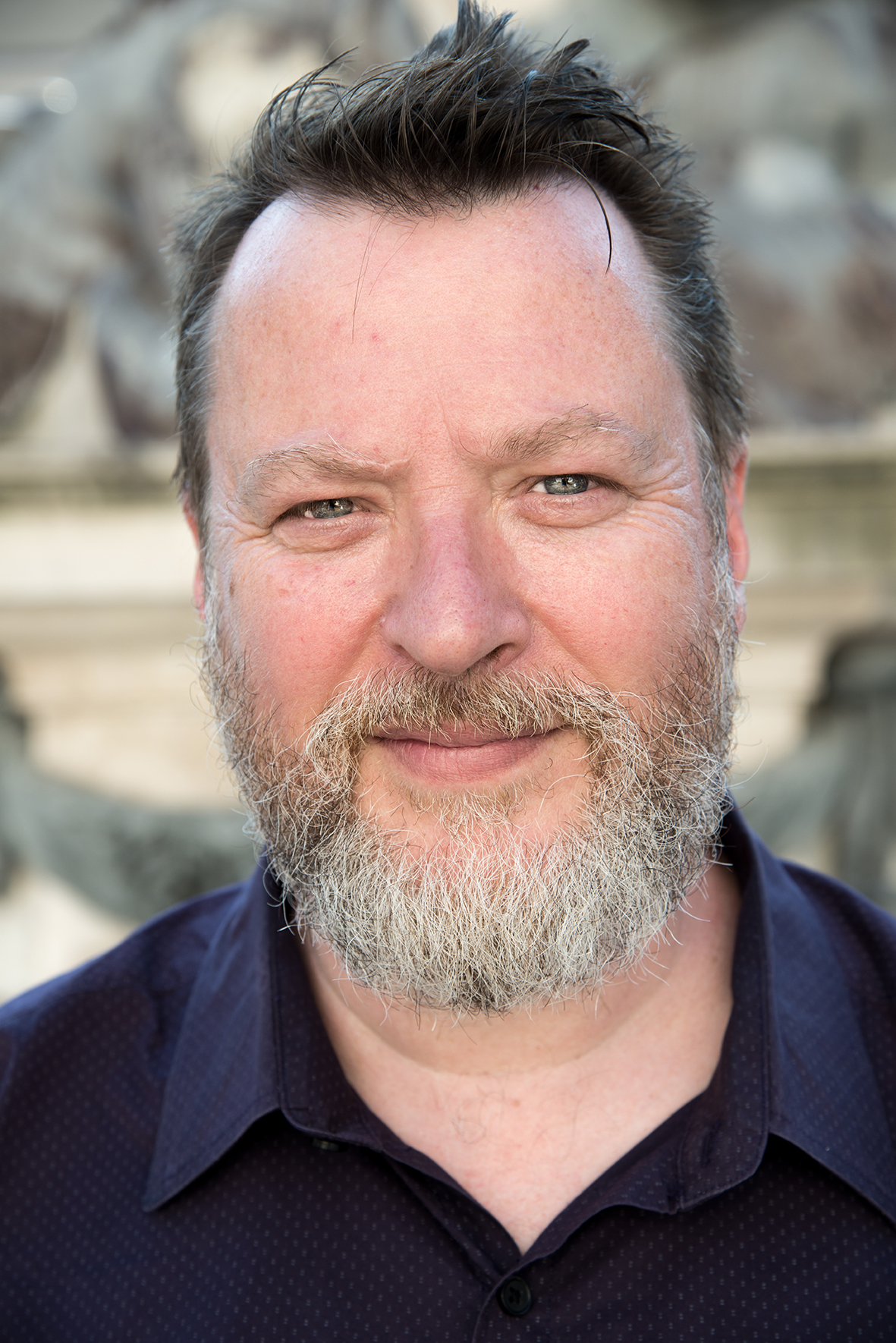
Julian Crouch

Improbable is an English theatre company founded in 1996 by Lee Simpson, Phelim McDermott, Julian Crouch (artistic directors) and producer Nick Sweeting. Improbable is funded by Arts Council England in London. According to their statement: "Improbable has grown out of a way of working that means being prepared to create work by the seat of your pants and the skin of your teeth, stepping onstage before you are ready and allowing the audience to have an integral part in the creation of a show."

The company "took theatre-making in new directions with a mix of puppetry, improvisation, comedy and storytelling, transforming the unlikeliest of material into striking, idiosyncratic entertainment."

As well as producing shows, Improbable has been developing a more direct approach to tackling complex social and cultural issues through hosting and facilitating Open Space events which so far have occurred around the UK and in Bulgaria, Romania, Israel, Canada, USA, Serbia and Brazil.

The reviewer for The Lantern wrote of the Improbable theatre's first production, 70 Hill Lane: "Improbable Theatre's production of 70 Hill Lane which opens at the Wexner Center tonight ... will shatter that stereotype. For once experimental theater has the potential to be something fun ... Phelim McDermott is one of the masterminds behind this performance ... 70 Hill Lane is impromptu with the actors making up lines and using props as they go along. The audience becomes involved, and there's a lot of humor. That's the way McDermott, and other co-founders, Lee Simpson and Julian Crouch, all from London, wanted it ... From London, the play has traveled to Cairo, Belgium, San Diego and New York gathering rave reviews."

Julian Crouch and Phelim McDermott directed and designed the new musical The Addams Family, which had tryouts in November 2009 in Chicago and opened on Broadway in April 2010.

== Productions ==
The theatre company has produced:

70 Hill Lane (1996), Animo, Lifegame (1998 & 2000), Cinderella, Coma (1999), Spirit, Sticky, The Hanging Man, Theatre Of Blood, Stars Are Out Tonight, The Wolves in the Walls, Satyagraha and Panic.

Panic is a co-production with the Barbican Centre, London, and the Wexner Center for the Arts, Columbus, Ohio, and the Sydney Opera House. Its world premiere was at the Wexner Center on 4 March 2009. It then opened in England on 19 March 2009 at the Corn Exchange, Newbury, before fulfilling a UK Tour which ended in a five-week run at The Barbican, London.
