= Mei Mac =

British actress (born 1992)

- Born: 1992 (age 33–34); Birmingham, England
- Education: King Edward VI Camp Hill School for Girls
- Occupation: Actress
- Known for: Starring as Mei in My Neighbour Totoro (2022)

Mei Mac (born 1992) is a British actress and theatre maker. For her performance in the stage adaptation of My Neighbour Totoro, she was nominated for a Laurence Olivier Award.

== Early life ==
Mac was born in Birmingham to a working-class Hong Kong immigrant family. She was a pupil at King Edward VI Camp Hill School for Girls, where she has described to have “a thriving arts culture”. She initially intended to study medicine at university. At 16, she was inspired to pursue acting by artistic director Kumiko Mendl of the New Earth Theatre, of which Mac is now an associate.

== Career ==
=== Stage ===
Mac's first theatre role was in the role of San in Whole Hog Theatre's stage adaptation of Studio Ghibli's Princess Mononoke. Studio Ghibli head and director of the original movie Hayao Miyazaki said of Mac's performance: "I've never imagined San as a real-life human being, but if she did exist, it would be you."

In August 2022, it was announced Mac would play the lead role of Mei in the Royal Shakespeare Company's staging of another Studio Ghibli movie, My Neighbour Totoro. The play opened at the Barbican to positive reviews. Mac's performance earned her a WhatsOnStage Award nomination for Best Performer in a Play, and an Olivier Awards nomination for Best Actress.

In May 2023 Mac appeared as Juliet, alongside Ncuti Gatwa's Romeo, as part of the Coronation Concert and starred in Kimber Lee's untitled f*ck m*ss s**gon play, in the Royal Exchange, Manchester and Young Vic in London.

In 2025, Mac was announced as the part of Lucy in Dracula at Lyric Theatre (Hammersmith).

In October 2026, Mac played "Girl" in Mei Leng Yew's debut play The Hungry Ghost at The Bush Theatre, Shepherd's Bush, alongside Isabella Wei's "Ghost". The play combines the traditional Chinese religious concept of a hungry ghost with modern-day life for a young queer woman.

=== Television ===
Mac has appeared in the long-running BBC drama Call the Midwife, and in the Comedy Central sketch show East Mode.

In 2024 it was announced she would join the cast of the Doctor Who spin-off series, The War Between the Land and the Sea.

== Personal life ==
Mac is openly queer. During lockdown, she co-founded Rising Waves, a collective for British East and Southeast Asian (BESEA) artists.

== Filmography ==
=== Television ===
Year	Title	Role	Channel/Network	Note/Refs
2021	Call the Midwife	Susan Chu	BBC One	Series 11 - Christmas special
2025	Blue Lights	Sammi Bei	BBC One	
2025	The Witcher	Burnita	Netflix	
2025	The War Between the Land and the Sea	Min Tso	BBC One	2 episodes

=== Audio drama ===
Year	Title	Role	Channel/Network	Note/Refs
2024	Up in Smoke	Kay McAllister	BBC Sounds	

=== Theatre ===
Year	Title	Role	Theatre	Notes/Refs
2022	My Neighbour Totoro	Mei	Whole Hog Theatre Barbican Theatre	
2023	Coronation Concert	Juliet	Windsor Castle	
2023	untitled f*ck m*ss s**gon play	Kim	Royal Exchange Theatre Young Vic Theatre	
2025	Dracula	Lucy	Lyric Theatre, Hammersmith	
2026	The Hungry Ghost	Girl	Bush Theatre, Shepherd's Bush	

== Awards and nominations ==
Year	Award	Category	Work	Result	Refs
2023	Laurence Olivier Awards	Best Actress	My Neighbour Totoro	Nominated	
2023	WhatsOnStage Awards	Best Performer in a Play	My Neighbour Totoro	Nominated	
2025	British Audio Awards	Best Performance: New Voice	Up in Smoke	Nominated	
