= Phelim McDermott =

British actor and stage director (born 1963)

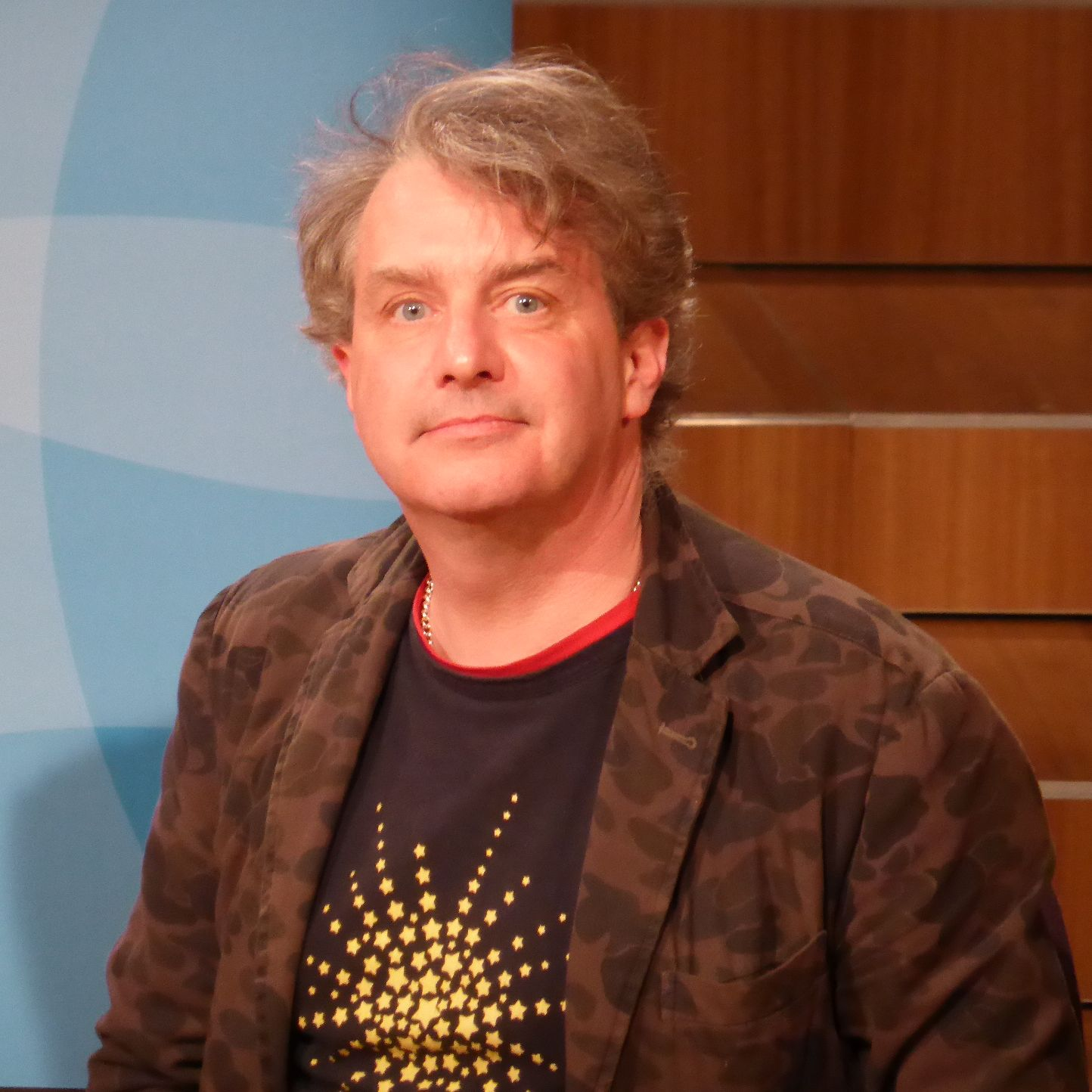
Phelim McDermott, 2014

Phelim McDermott (born 21 August 1963) is an English actor and stage director. He has directed plays and operas in Britain, Germany, Spain, the United States, and Australia. McDermott was a co-founder of the theatre company Improbable in 1996.

== Career ==
McDermott was born in Manchester, England. His screen debut was as Jester in the 1991 film Robin Hood, followed by further minor roles in The Baby of Mâcon (1993) and other films. He has appeared on stage in 1996 in his own play 70 Hill Lane, based on a reported experience with a poltergeist when he was 15 and a 2017 production of Lost Without Words at the Royal National Theatre. He also appeared in the BBC Radio 4 improvisational show The Masterson Inheritance (1993 to 1995).

He was made an Honorary Doctor of Middlesex University in 2007.

McDermott received the 2023 Laurence Olivier Award for Best Director for My Neighbour Totoro.

=== Notable productions ===
- 1996: 70 Hill Lane by McDermott, Brewery Arts Centre, Kendal
- 1997: A Midsummer Night's Dream, directed with Julian Crouch for the Royal Shakespeare Company
- 1998: Shockheaded Peter for the West Yorkshire Playhouse, Leeds, and the Lyric Hammersmith, London
- 2002: A Midsummer Night's Dream for Deutsches Schauspielhaus, Hamburg
- 2007: Satyagraha by Philip Glass for English National Opera (ENO), and in 2008 for the Metropolitan Opera (MET), New York; restaged at the ENO in 2009 and 2013, and in 2011 at the MET
- 2009: The Addams Family with Bebe Neuwirth and Nathan Lane, Oriental Theatre, Chicago, and in 2010 at the Lunt-Fontanne Theatre, Broadway
- 2011: The Enchanted Island for the Metropolitan Opera, New York
- 2013: The Perfect American by Philip Glass for Teatro Real, Madrid, English National Opera, and in 2014 for Opera Queensland and Brisbane Festival
- 2014: Così fan tutte by Wolfgang Amadeus Mozart for English National Opera
- 2016: Akhnaten by Philip Glass for English National Opera
- 2017: Aida by Giuseppe Verdi for English National Opera
- 2018: Così fan tutte by Mozart, a new production for the Metropolitan Opera
- 2019: Tao of Glass by Philip Glass, a new production for the Manchester International Festival
- 2019: Akhnaten by Philip Glass for the Metropolitan Opera
- 2022: The Hours by Kevin Puts for the Metropolitan Opera
- 2022: My Neighbour Totoro by Tom Morton-Smith at the Barbican Centre
- 2026: Tao of Glass, West End premiere @sohoplace
