= Zubin Varla =

British actor and singer (born 1970)

- Born: 1970 (age 55–56)

Zubin Varla (born 1970) is a British actor and singer. He played the role of Judas in the 1996 West End revival of Jesus Christ Superstar, alongside Steve Balsamo (Jesus), Joanna Ampil (Mary Magdalene), and David Burt (Pilate). This production was staged at Lyceum Theatre. He starred in the Off-West End production of Ghost Quartet and in 2022, he appeared in Tammy Faye at the Almeida Theatre, for which he won the 2023 Laurence Olivier Award for Best Actor in a Supporting Role in a Musical.

== Career ==
Varla was trained at the Guildhall School of Music and Drama, where he performed as Renato di Rossi in Do I Hear a Waltz? in July 1992 at the Barbican Theatre, London. In 2004, he performed in Cyrano de Bergerac at the Royal National Theatre, and was Marcus Brutus in Julius Caesar, while on tour for the Royal Shakespeare Company. He initiated the role of Saleem in the first written-for-stage production of Midnight's Children at London's Barbican Theatre in 2001-2.

In 2001 he played the role of Frederick Trumper in a Danish production of Chess.

He took a leading role in the Silent Witness episode "Cargo" as Detective Superintendent Vijay Asher. He played Daniel Doyce in the BBC TV adaptation of Charles Dickens' Little Dorrit in October 2008.

In 2009, he played in Shakespeare's Twelfth Night as Feste alongside Derek Jacobi. In 2010, he appeared in I, Claudius as Herod Agrippa. He starred in Equus, which premiered at Theatre Royal Stratford East, later moving to Trafalgar Theatre.

In 2013, Varla portrayed Gustav Mahler in a performance with the London Arts Orchestra. The same year, he featured as Leo Kamali in the 4th season of Strike Back. In 2014 he featured in 5 episodes of The BBC's production of Our Girl as Qaseem.

In 2018, he played Bruce in the off-West End production of Fun Home at the Young Vic and was nominated for the 2019 Olivier Award for Best Actor in a Musical.

In 2019 he played the Astronomer, the Subway Driver, and Edgar Usher in the Off-West End production of Dave Malloy's Ghost Quartet in its London premiere. In 2022, he appeared in Tammy Faye at the Almeida Theatre, for which he won the 2023 Olivier Award for Best Supporting Actor in a Musical.

In 2023 he played the role of Harold Stein in Hanya Yanagihara‘s "A Little Life". Originally performed at The Harold Pinter theatre in London, it later transferred to The Savoy Theatre for an extended run.

In 2026, Varla has been cast to appear in the season three of The Lord of the Rings: The Rings of Power.

== Filmography ==
=== Television ===
Year	Title	Role	Notes
2026	The Lord of the Rings: The Rings of Power	Khamûl the Easterling	Upcoming role

=== Theater ===
Year	Title	Role	Notes
2009	Mad Sad & Bad	Hardeep	
2020	A Midsummer Night's Dream	Theseus, Oberon	
