= William Gaminara =

British actor and writer (born 1956)

- Born: 1956 (age 69–70)
- Occupations: Actor, writer
- Years active: 1985–present

William Gaminara (born 1956) is a British actor, screenwriter and playwright, probably best known for playing pathologist Professor Leo Dalton on the television series Silent Witness, from 2002 to 2013. His plays include According to Hoyle, The Three Lions and The Nightingales.

== Early life and education ==
Gaminara was born in 1956 in Lusaka, Northern Rhodesia. He was educated at Winchester College, Hampshire, England, and Lincoln College at the University of Oxford.

== Career ==
=== Actor and narrator ===
Gaminara had a minor role in the 1986 film Comrades, directed by Bill Douglas. His early television credits include Dr Andrew Bower in Casualty (1989–92) and Will Newman in Attachments (2000–02).

His most notable television role was Professor Leo Dalton in the BBC crime drama series Silent Witness. He played Dalton from 2002 until 2013, and reprised the role in 2017 in the final episode of series 20. The role was at first subsidiary to Sam Ryan, played by Amanda Burton, but when Burton left the series and Gaminara's character Dalton headed the laboratory, the drama evolved into a three-hander between Dalton, Harry Cunningham (Tom Ward) and Nikki Alexander (Emilia Fox).

After leaving Silent Witness, Gaminara appeared in several theatrical roles. In 2014, he played the photojournalist Paul Watson in Dan O'Brien's The Body of an American, a two-hander with Damien Molony. Gaminara describes the play as a "challenging and unconventional script which makes challenging and unconventional demands of an actor". Lyn Gardner, writing in The Guardian, describes the acting as "knockout", with the "muscular quality of a contest" whilst being "scrupulously generous"; she highlights the way in which the two actors each embody a large number of characters and are required to swap between roles abruptly. The production was also praised by Dominic Maxwell in The Times for "superb" acting on the part of both leads.

The following year, he played the lead character, Pastor Paul, in Lucas Hnath's The Christians at the Traverse Theatre during the Edinburgh Festival, giving a "superbly controlled performance", which "nails the slow, measured but warmly faux-colloquial rhetoric of the American church", according to a review in The Independent. Gardner, in The Guardian, describes Gaminara as "suggesting both the charisma and the arrogance" of his character, and Dominic Maxwell, in a review for The Times, considers that Gaminara "propels it all with conviction". Also in 2015, Gaminara took the supporting role of General Groves in the premiere of Tom Morton-Smith's Oppenheimer by the Royal Shakespeare Company at The Swan in Stratford-upon-Avon. Michael Billington, in a 5-star review for The Guardian, highlights "outstanding performances" from Gaminara among others, as does Kate Kellaway, in a later Guardian review.

In 2016, he appeared in Ibsen's An Enemy of the People at the Chichester Festival Theatre, directed by Howard Davies; Gaminara plays the principal antagonist Peter Stockmann "chillingly", according to Christopher Hart's review for The Sunday Times. Susannah Clapp, in a review for The Observer, describes Gaminara's performance as "finely slippery", and Ann Treneman in The Times praises his "small-town fury".

Since his time on Silent Witness, Gaminara has taken occasional television roles, including in The Trial of Christine Keeler (BBC One; 2019–20), the crime drama Honour (ITV; 2020), as well as guest appearances in the sitcom Catastrophe (Channel 4) and the crime drama Death in Paradise (BBC One; 2022). He played Dr Richard Locke in the long-running radio soap opera, The Archers. He also voices audiobooks, including Bernard Cornwell's Sharpe novels and John Christopher's The Tripods.

=== Playwright and screenwriter ===
Gaminara's first play, Back Up the Hearse and Smell the Flowers (1992), about water-purifier salesmen, is influenced by David Mamet's Glengarry Glen Ross. Michael Billington, in a review of a 1992 production at Hampstead Theatre for The Guardian, praises its encapsulation of the "guile, bluster and conviction" of a "perfect pitch" but criticises its "heavy-handed tendency to moralise". The director Dominic Dromgoole describes it as "smoothly accomplished, but unambitious".

His second play, According to Hoyle (1995), takes a comedic approach to male identity and the relationships between men using the setting of a poker game. Dromgoole describes it as "quite wonderful", but overshadowed by the success of Dealer's Choice, a play on the same topic by Patrick Marber, which came out at almost the same time. Lyn Gardner, in a review of a 1995 production at Hampstead Theatre for The Guardian, describes it as a "feisty, sharply entertaining comedy" with a "rather nifty construction" employing interleaved timelines, and praises the "whiplash severity" of its dialogue. Benedict Nightingale, in a review for The Times, writes that Gaminara has a "gift for funny dialogue" and considers the play's conclusion to demonstrate the independence of his viewpoint. During this period Gaminara also wrote episodes for the television series This Life (1997) and The Lakes (1999), as well as the screenplay for the BBC adaptation of Rachel Morris's novel, Ella and the Mothers (2002).

His play The Three Lions was performed at the Pleasance Courtyard at the Edinburgh Festival in 2013, produced by Philip Wilson. A comedy about the unsuccessful English bid for the 2018 World Cup, it brings together David Beckham (Sean Browne), David Cameron (Dugald Bruce-Lockhart) and Prince William (Tom Davey). Lucinda Everett, writing in The Daily Telegraph, describes it as a "gleefully irreverent glimpse 'behind the scenes'" with a "zingy script". A reviewer for The Independent writes that the "neat script combines light satire with good, old-fashioned farce".

In 2018, his comedy–drama The Nightingales was produced at the New Theatre in Cardiff, directed by Christopher Luscombe and starring Ruth Jones. Jones, an acquaintance of Gaminara's, describes the play as "gripping" and "really funny", saying that Gaminara has a "wonderful ear for naturalistic dialogue" and "has tuned in with such insight to human nature and the ways we behave in groups and also how we relate to each other and what we choose to reveal about ourselves." Sam Marlowe, in a critical review for The Times of a production at the Theatre Royal, Bath, describes the play as "an inconsequential, darkish comedy" with "cardboard" characters and dialogue reminiscent of a "dated sitcom".

== Personal life ==
Gaminara is married to Kate Lock, also an actor; they have two sons.

== Filmography ==
=== Film ===
| Year | Title | Role | Notes |
|---|---|---|---|
| 1986 | Comrades | James Loveless | |
| 2002 | The Law | Alan Vine | TV film |

=== Television ===
| Year | Title | Role | Notes |
|---|---|---|---|
| 1986 | Paradise Postponed | Peter | Episode: "Death of a Saint" |
| 1987 | The Mistress | Customer | Episode: "Series 2, Episode 2" |
| 1987 | Bulman | Willie Bruce | Recurring role, 2 episodes |
| 1988 | Screen Two | Tim Sage | Episode: "Dead Lucky" |
| 1989-1993 | Casualty | Andrew Bower | Series regular, 13 episodes |
| 1991 | The Bill | Inspector Bruce | Recurring role, 2 episodes |
| 1991 | Soldier Soldier | Major Harry 'Dickie' Bird | Episode: "Fun and Games" |
| 1991 | The House of Eliott | Robert Adams | Recurring role, 2 episodes |
| 1994 | A Dark-Adapted Eye | Andrew | Mini-series, 2 episodes |
| 1996 | The Bill | Dr. Anthony Perry | Episode: "Helping Hands" |
| 1996 | Dangerfield | Matthew Davidson | Episode: "Games" |
| 1997 | Rag Nymph | Mr. Quinton | Mini-series, 2 episodes |
| 1998 | The Broker's Man | Superintendent Staples | Episode: "Pensioned Off" |
| 1999 | Hope and Glory | Colin Ward | |
| 2000 | Attachments | Will Newman | |
| 2001 | People Like Us | Captain Paul Connors | Episode: "The Airline Pilot" |
| 2002-2017 | Silent Witness | Leo Dalton | Series regular, 107 episodes |
| 2003 | Spooks | Victor Gleeson | Episode: "Spiders" |
| 2015 | Father Brown | Samuel Harrogate | Episode: "The Paradise of Thieves" |
| 2017 | Electric Dreams | Dr. El Ganol | Episode: "Human Is" |
| 2017 | The Tunnel | Wesley Pollinger | Recurring role, 2 episodes |
| 2018 | The Alienist | Alexander MacLeod | Episode: "Hildebrandt's Starling" |
| 2018 | Becca's Bunch | Uncle Ned (voice) | Series regular, 21 episodes |
| 2019 | Catastrophe | Stephen | Episode: "Series 4, Episode 4" |
| 2019 | Summer of Rockets | Dick Armstrong | Recurring role, 2 episodes |
| 2019 | The Dark Crystal: Age of Resistance | Additional roles | Recurring, 5 episodes |
| 2020 | The Trial of Christine Keeler | John Hobson | Recurring role, 2 episodes |
| 2020 | Honour | David Lederman | Episode: "Part Two" |
| 2022 | Death in Paradise | Chris Darlow | Episode: "Series 11, Episode 3" |
| 2025 | The War Between the Land and the Sea | Ted Campbell | Mini-series, 3 episodes |

=== Radio ===
| Year | Title | Role | Notes |
|---|---|---|---|
| 1992 | The Archers | Dr. Richard Locke | |

=== Video games ===
| Year | Title | Role | Notes |
|---|---|---|---|
| 2022 | Elden Ring | Kenneth Haight | |

== Theatre credits ==
| Year | Title | Role | Venue |
|---|---|---|---|
| 1984 | Bloody Poetry | Dr. William Polidori | Hampstead Theatre, London |
| 1990 | A Single Man | Jim | Greenwich Theatre, London |
| 1990 | More Than One Antoinette | Rochester | Young Vic, London |
| 1991 | Broadway Bound | Stanley Jerome | Greenwich Theatre, London |
| 1994 | The Children's Hour | Dr. Joseph Cardin | Royal National Theatre, London |
| 2013 | Less Than Kind | Sir John | UK Tour |
| 2014 | The Body of an American | Paul Watson | The Gate Theatre, London & Royal & Derngate, Northampton |
| 2014 | Twelve Angry Men | Juror 10 | Garrick Theatre, London |
| 2014 | The Shoemaker's Holiday | Sir Roger Otley | Swan Theatre, Stratford-upon-Avon |
| 2015 | Oppenheimer | Leslie Groves | Swan Theatre, Stratford-upon-Avon |
| 2015 | The Christians | Pastor Paul | Traverse Theatre, Edinburgh & The Gate Theatre, London |
| 2016 | An Enemy of the People | Peter Stockmann | Chichester Festival Theatre, Chichester |
