= The Earthworks =

2017 play by Tom Morton-Smith

- Original language: English
- Written by: Tom Morton-Smith
- Setting: Large Hadron Collider

Premiere
- Date: May 2017
- Place: The Other Place, Stratford-upon-Avon

The Earthworks is a play by playwright Tom Morton-Smith. It premiered with the Royal Shakespeare Company at The Other Place, Stratford-upon-Avon, in May 2017. The original production was directed by RSC deputy artistic director Erica Whyman.

In October 2023 it was announced that the play would be staged at the Young Vic Theatre, London, directed by Andrea Ling (winner of the 2023 Genesis Future Directors Award). This production is due to run from 26 March until 4 April 2024.

== Plot ==
The play is set on the eve of the activation of the Large Hadron Collider in Geneva, Switzerland, and concerns the meeting of a scientist and a journalist.

== Performance history and reception ==
The play premiered at The Other Place, Stratford Upon Avon, where it appeared as part of a double bill alongside another new play, Myth by Kirsty Housley and Matt Hartley. Earthworks received positive reviews, with the Financial Times' Ian Shuttleworth praising the piece for blending "accessible scientific explanation with sensitive human insight" in his four star review. In her four star review for the Evening Standard, Fiona Mountford described the play as "small-scale and delicate... Morton-Smith reminds us that it's the most intimate human connections that have the greatest impact." Lyn Gardner in her Guardian review asked "who wouldn't love a play that uses a custard fight to explain mass?" However, the Daily Telegraph gave the double-bill a two star review, and stated that Earthworks showed the "great difficulty" of following Morton-Smith's previous work Oppenheimer.
