= The Law (2002 film) =

2002 British television film

- Genre: Crime drama
- Directed by: Juliet May
- Starring: Douglas Hodge; Joe McFadden; Amita Dhiri; Sharon Duce; Barbara Flynn; William Gaminara; Sam Loggin; Sarah Malin; Nicola Redmond
- Composer: Jim Parker
- Country of origin: United Kingdom
- Original language: English
- No. of episodes: 1

Production
- Executive producer: Chris Parr
- Producer: May Gibson
- Cinematography: Dick Dodd
- Editor: Jake Bernard
- Running time: 90 minutes
- Production company: Thames Television

Original release
- Network: ITV
- Release: 12 June 2002

The Law is a single British television crime drama film, directed by Juliet May, that first broadcast on ITV at 21:00 on 12 June 2002. The film, billed as the UK's first attempt at a Law & Order-style series, focuses on a single case first investigated by the police and then taken to court by the Crown Prosecution Service. Intended as the backdoor pilot for a potential series, The Law received poor reception from both viewers and critics alike; and subsequently a full series was never commissioned.

The film was shot throughout the summer of 2000 and was originally slated for broadcast on 1 September 2000; however, for reasons unknown, the film was shelved and not rescheduled for broadcast until over 18 months later. The film starred Douglas Hodge as Detective Inspector Jack Raleigh; who is partnered with Junior Detective Constable Stephen Connor, played by Joe McFadden. Amita Dhiri, Sharon Duce, Barbara Flynn and William Gaminara are also credited amongst the main cast. The film gathered 5.42 million viewers. The film has never been released on VHS or DVD.

== Cast ==
- Douglas Hodge as Detective Inspector Jack Raleigh
- Joe McFadden as Detective Constable Stephen Connor
- Amita Dhiri as Helen Galloway
- Sharon Duce as Linda Farrer QC
- Barbara Flynn as Eleanor Kimborough
- William Gaminara as Alan Vine
- Sam Loggin as Anna Darmon
- Sarah Malin as Dawn Trent
- Nicola Redmond as Detective Chief Inspector Maria Denby
