= Tom Morton-Smith =

English playwright

- Born: Thomas Morton-Smith; 1980 or 1981 (age 45–46)
- Education: University of East Anglia; London Academy of Music and Dramatic Art
- Occupation: Playwright
- Website: www.tommortonsmith.com

Tom Morton-Smith (born 1980 or 1981) is an Olivier Award-winning English playwright.

== Early life and education ==
Morton-Smith grew up in the countryside in Sussex. He wrote his first play aged 17 and won a local competition.

Morton-Smith studied drama at the University of East Anglia (UEA) before training as an actor at the London Academy of Music and Dramatic Art (LAMDA). While a student at UEA, Morton-Smith was a member of Minotaur Theatre Company, with whom he created a new play, Black Boxes and Amber Rooms, for the 2001 National Student Drama Festival.

== Career ==
In 2006, Morton-Smith was selected to be part of Future Perfect, a writer's group attached to the Paines Plough theatre company. In 2007, he joined the company as their playwright-in-residence.

His debut stage play, Salt Meets Wound, premiered at Theatre503 in May 2007.

His play Oppenheimer, about the physicist J Robert Oppenheimer and the building of the atomic bomb, was performed by the Royal Shakespeare Company in 2015 in the Swan Theatre, Stratford-upon-Avon, until it transferred to London's West End in April 2015. The play was nominated for Best New Play at the 2016 WhatsOnStage Awards.

In April 2022, it was announced that he would adapt Studio Ghibli's 1988 animated film My Neighbour Totoro for the stage. Produced by the Royal Shakespeare Company and the film's original composer Joe Hisaishi, the play ran for a fifteen-week limited season at the Barbican Theatre in London from October 2022. The play won five categories at the 2023 WhatsOnStage Awards, having been nominated in nine. It also won six categories (out of nine nominations) at the 2023 Laurence Olivier Awards, including Best Entertainment or Comedy Play. Morton-Smith dedicated his Olivier award to the memory of his stillborn daughter.

== Works ==
=== Plays ===
- Salt Meets Wound (2007) (premiered at Theatre503)
- Everyday Maps for Everyday Use (2012) (premiered at the Finborough Theatre, London)
- In Doggerland (2013) (premiered at the Lowry, Manchester)
- Oppenheimer (2015) (premiered at the Swan Theatre, Stratford-upon-Avon, transferred to the Vaudeville Theatre)
- The Earthworks (2017) (premiered at The Other Place, Stratford-upon-Avon)
- Ravens: Spassky vs. Fischer (2019) (premiered at the Hampstead Theatre)
- My Neighbour Totoro (2022) (based on the Studio Ghibli film of the same name, premiered at the Barbican, transferred to the Gillian Lynne Theatre)

=== Radio ===
- Flesh (2009) (episode 3 of series 2 of The Man in Black, BBC Radio 7)
- The Wind in the Willows: a Weasel's Tale (2025), (after The Wind in the Willows by Kenneth Grahame, BBC Radio 4)

== Awards and nominations ==
Year	Award	Category	Nominated work(s)	Result	Refs
2012	Papatango New Writing Prize		Everyday Maps for Everyday Use	Runner-up	
2016	WhatsOnStage Awards	Best New Play	Oppenheimer	Nominated	
2023	Laurence Olivier Awards	Best Entertainment or Comedy Play	My Neighbour Totoro	Won	
2023	WhatsOnStage Awards	Best New Play	My Neighbour Totoro	Nominated	
