= Zoë Eeles =

Scottish actress

- Born: 1975 (age 50–51); Dumfries, Scotland, United Kingdom
- Occupation: Actress

Zoë Eeles (born 1975) is a British actress from Dumfries, Scotland.

Eeles was born in Dumfries and moved to Glasgow at the age of five. Her father Bert was a film editor and her mother Donalda was an actress. She received a Higher National Certificate in theatre arts and then won a place at Edinburgh's Queen Margaret University Drama school gaining a degree in Acting.

Eeles moved to London to pursue an acting career, and gained a few bit parts in film and theatre, including a small role as a nurse in the Charlie Sheen film Obit. Her breakthrough came when she was cast in a leading role in the BBC sitcom All Along the Watchtower. In 2000, Eeles and Justin Pierre played two supporting characters (DC Sam Phillips and DS Dave Summers) to Christopher Ellison's DCI Frank Burnside in Burnside, a spin-off from police drama The Bill. Other major television roles followed, including the roles of Karen in Lucy Sullivan Is Getting Married, Tina in Auf Wiedersehen, Pet, and Annie Craig in Rockface.
