= Rockface (TV series) =

British television drama (2002-2003)

- The cast of Rockface (L-R): Cal MacAninch, Zoë Eeles, Rupert Evans, Brendan Coyle, Melanie Gutteridge, Jamie Sives, Clive Russell and Richard Graham
- Genre: Drama
- Created by: Nicholas Hicks-Beach; Shelley Miller
- Starring: Clive Russell; Brendan Coyle; Cal MacAninch; Richard Graham; Zoë Eeles; Melanie Gutteridge; Jamie Sives; Rupert Evans; Kenneth Bryans; Louise Goodall; Kim Vithana; Jan Harvey; Barbara Rafferty
- Composer: Colin Towns
- Country of origin: United Kingdom
- Original language: English
- No. of series: 2
- No. of episodes: 14

Production
- Executive producers: Claire Hirsch; Bradley Adams; Nadine Marsh-Edwards; Kevin Loader; Barbara McKissack; Kevan Van Thompson
- Producers: Jacky Stoller; Neil Zeiger
- Production location: Scottish Highlands
- Cinematography: Colin Munn
- Editor: Chris Wimble
- Running time: 60 minutes
- Production companies: BBC Scotland; Union Pictures; Sony Pictures Television International

Original release
- Network: BBC One
- Release: 13 March 2002 – 27 July 2003

Rockface is a British television drama series, principally written and created by Nicholas Hicks-Beach and Shelley Miller, that first broadcast on BBC One on 13 March 2002. The series, set in Glenntannoch, a fictitious town in the Scottish Highlands, centres on a mountain rescue team led by Dr Gordon Urquhart (Clive Russell). The major rescues and incidents featured within the series were based upon real life rescues conducted by the Lochaber Mountain Rescue service. Prior to filming, the cast underwent training to gather knowledge of the skills required to become a real-life mountain rescue team, under the guidance of trainer Mick Tighe.

Rockface ran for two series; the first series of six episodes broadcasting in 2002 on Wednesday evenings; with a second series of eight episodes following in 2003 on Sunday evenings. Strong critical reception and reasonable viewing figures lead to a second series being commissioned before the first had finished broadcasting. The final episode was broadcast on 27 July 2003. Notably, despite being listed for release, the series has never been made available on DVD. An interactive website, including games based upon the series as well as cast profiles and computer wallpapers and screensavers, was launched online shortly before the series' television debut.

== Production ==
Prior to filming, the cast undertook several days of mountain rescue training, under the guidance of trainer Mick Tighe. Tighe said of the cast; "Getting raw recruits is not alien to me, but they did very well, I was very impressed with them." Clive Russell commented; "All of us who underwent that training together developed a really strong bond. What we learned about ourselves and each other will never go away." Cal MacAninch added; "Mick put us all through our paces. His military background was familiar to me through the work I did filming Warriors, so I was used to that attitude and sense of humour. I loved his drive and his determination was very inspiring – even when he picked on me as I struggled up a hill. What he taught us all was to keep going and stop moaning – that has helped me in everything I do – especially on film sets."

Real-life Search and Rescue helicopters and crew were used for external shots. Crew and helicopters from the Royal Navy's HMS GANNET Search and Rescue Flight based at Prestwick airport, Ayrshire. On a number of occasions, filming of certain sequences were interrupted by the aircraft being called away on real "shouts".

== Cast ==
- Clive Russell as Dr Gordon Urquhart
- Brendan Coyle as Douglas McLanaghan
- Cal MacAninch as Ben Craig
- Richard Graham as Mike Bayliss
- Zoë Eeles as Annie Craig
- Melanie Gutteridge as Caroline Morrison
- Jamie Sives as PC Peter Craig
- Rupert Evans as Jamie Doughan
- Kenneth Bryans as Danny Tunick
- Louise Goodall as WPC Betty Farinelli
- Kim Vithana as Nurse Helen
- Jan Harvey as Dr Jane Chamberlain
- Barbara Rafferty as Alice Urquhart

== Episodes ==
=== Series 1 (2002) ===
No. in series	Title	Directed by	Written by	Original release date	Viewers (millions)
1	"Situation: Critical"	Robert Bierman	Nicholas Hicks-Beach & Shelley Miller	13 March 2002	5.51
Jamie underestimates the danger involved after he finds himself balanced on the edge of a rockface whilst attempting to rescue a photographer who has fallen. The team come to the aid of a man who has ruptured his spleen after tripping over whilst out walking with his brother, but are forced into an agonising wait for a rescue helicopter to arrive. Douglas has to rescue a diabetic who is in danger of going into a coma. Caroline wants to join the rescue team, but the team are wary of her because her father has donated money to the mountain rescue service.
2	TBA	Robert Bierman	Nicholas Hicks-Beach & Shelley Miller	20 March 2002	5.02
Mike tries to rescue a girl trapped in a cave, but finds the only way out is to crawl through a series of tunnels. Jamie, Douglas and Annie come to the rescue of a group of rope climbers who have fallen. Jamie is not very happy when he discovers his mother is now a consultant at the hospital. Annie faces a tough test. Despite their differences, Douglas and Helen decide to go out for a meal together.
3	TBA	Sue Dunderdale	Nicholas Hicks-Beach & Shelley Miller	27 March 2002	N/A
The team attempt to rescue two boys who have become stranded above a waterfall. Caroline and Jamie get chatting at her father's party. Gordon's daughter Kirsty returns from university, sparking further problems for Douglas. Ben finds it difficult to accept Caroline onto the team.
4	"Desperate and Dangerous"	Sue Dunderdale	Nicholas Hicks-Beach & Shelley Miller	3 April 2002	N/A
The team dress up as rescuers from the 1900s to raise funds for the rescue service, but are sidetracked by a woman with MS to has become stranded whilst trying to take in the stunning views. Douglas resigns as deputy when he is told that he will have to take his rescue days of out of his annual leave. Caroline rescues a man who has fallen and whose wound is covered in flies and maggots, only to discover that he is the son of Douglas' boss, Dennis. After the dramatic rescue, Caroline is voted onto the team, with a special recommendation from Ben.
5	TBA	Terry Winsor	Nicholas Hicks-Beach & Shelley Miller	10 April 2002	4.50
Annie and Ben find themselves out on the hills searching for a chopper which has crashed. When they find it, they are taken hostage by the survivors, whose leader is an escaped prisoner who forces them to take him to his pick up point. Meanwhile, the remaining members of the team rescue a man who has fallen from Dragon's Tooth Sea Stack. But Mike is reprimanded after giving the man chocolate with nuts in, unaware that he has a serious nut allergy.
6	TBA	Terry Winsor	Nicholas Hicks-Beach & Shelley Miller	17 April 2002	N/A
Gordon's wife plans a surprise party for his birthday. Peter begins to worry about Annie and Ben, and sets off to look for them. Gordon and Doug go to rescue some monks trapped on a hill, but are faced with a life or death situation after being caught in the middle of a rockfall.

=== Series 2 (2003) ===
No. in series	Title	Directed by	Written by	Original release date	Viewers (millions)
1	"Unfortunate Victim"	Terry Winsor	Nicholas Hicks-Beach & Shelley Miller	25 May 2003	N/A
Douglas is keen to get back to work, but Helen isn't so keen on the idea. The team are called to rescue a hand glider who has become entangled in cables, and a man who has fallen into a waterfall whilst out rambling with his wife.
2	TBA	Terry Winsor	Nicholas Hicks-Beach & Shelley Miller	1 June 2003	N/A
Mike goes to the rescue of a construction team whose Land Rover has left the road and plummeted down a cliff. Douglas receives the all clear to return to work. Ben and Annie attempt to rescue a climber who has fallen down a mountain whilst stealing falcon eggs. Annie goes to see Ben to see why he is avoiding her.
3	TBA	Mark Roper	Shelley Miller	8 June 2003	N/A
Douglas continues to have nightmares. Whilst out on a run, Peter and Ben find a man walking in a daze with cuts to his face. Caroline is upset to witness Adam's fiance rejecting him.
4	TBA	Mark Roper	Nicholas Hicks-Beach	15 June 2003	N/A
The team come to the rescue of two climbers who have fallen from a rockface. Mike decides to make a video for a dating agency and Caroline films him. Caroline is called for her annual assessment by Peter, but Jamie informs her that he has been asked to do it instead. Helen wonders why Douglas is so moody and cold towards her, and Jane suggests that he is still affected by his fall.
5	TBA	Terry Winsor	Steve Trafford	22 June 2003	N/A
Jamie takes part in a cross country cycle race with his friend Ian, but when they get into an argument, Ian falls down the rocks into the river below. When Jamie climbs down to help him, he ends up falling himself.
6	TBA	Terry Winsor	Steve Trafford	29 June 2003	N/A
Four teenagers wander into a drain that belongs to an old dam to have a party, but during a thunderstorm, water seeps into the drain, trapping the four boys inside. One of them manages to swim out and alerts the rescue team. One of the boys is identified as Betty's son Jason, and Annie discovers that the others are in the sixth form at the school where she teaches.
7	TBA	Suri Krishnama	Alick Rowe	13 July 2003	N/A
Danny helps a tour guide who is trying to organise a ramble with two patrons with impaired vision, but whilst en route, the tour guide has a heart attack and the two patrons are left alone. Foolishly, one of the partially sighted women wanders off, believing that they have more chance of being rescued that way.
8	TBA	Suri Krishnama	Nicholas Hicks-Beach & Shelley Miller	27 July 2003	N/A
Douglas and Gordon are involved in a serious accident together. Meanwhile, the team receive news that following heavy snowfall, an avalanche has occurred up on the hills, and two young people who have been skiing have been reported missing.
