= Claire Trévien =

British writer

- Born: 24 September 1985 (age 40); Pont-l'Abbé, France
- Occupations: Poet, academic
- Writing career
- Period: 2010 - present
- Website: www.clairetrevien.co.uk

Claire Trévien (born 1985) is a Brittsh-French poet and academic.

== Biography ==
She was born in Pont-l'Abbé, France in 1985. She obtained a PhD from the University of Warwick in 2012 on 'Revolutionary Prints as Spectacle' and has been published in a number of scholarly journals with a forthcoming book.

Trévien's first pamphlet, Low-Tide Lottery, was published by Salt in 2011. It was followed by the publication of her first collection The Shipwrecked House in 2013 by Penned in the Margins. This collection was voted the reader's choice and longlisted in the Guardian First Book Award. A poem from the collection was also highly commended in the Forward Prizes for Poetry 2014. The collection was widely reviewed in Poetry London, The Warwick Review, For Books' Sake, in numerous blogs, as well as on YouTube.

Her poetry has appeared in numerous newspaper, magazines and anthologies including The Guardian, The Sunday Times, and Best British Poetry 2012. She was on the Huffington Post's list of 5 British Poets to Watch in 2014.

Trévien's collection The Shipwrecked House was co-commissioned by Ledbury Poetry Festival as a one-woman show and toured the UK in autumn 2014, funded by the Arts Council.

On 22 November, Trévien wrote 100 poems in a day, raising over £600 for chosen charity Refuge (United Kingdom charity).

She was the Poetry School's first digital Poet-in-Residence in November 2013.

Her second collection of poetry, Astéronymes, was published by Penned in the Margins in 2016. Trévien founded and co-edits Sabotage Reviews, a website that reviews independent literature. She co-edits Verse Kraken with Tori Truslow, a journal of hybrid art. With Odette Toilette she co-organizes Penning Perfumes, a creative collaboration between perfumers and poets. They toured the UK in early 2013 thanks to Arts Council Funding. She was the editor of the National Student Drama Festival magazine Noises Off from 2010 to 2012.

== Works ==
- Low-Tide Lottery, Salt Publishing, 2011
- The Shipwrecked House, Penned in the Margins, 2013
- Astéronymes, Penned in the Margins, 2016
- Satire, prints and theatricality in the French Revolution, Oxford University Studies in the Enlightenment, 2016
- Our Lady of Tyres, Broken Sleep Books, 2022
