= Dmytro Morykit =

British composer and pianist

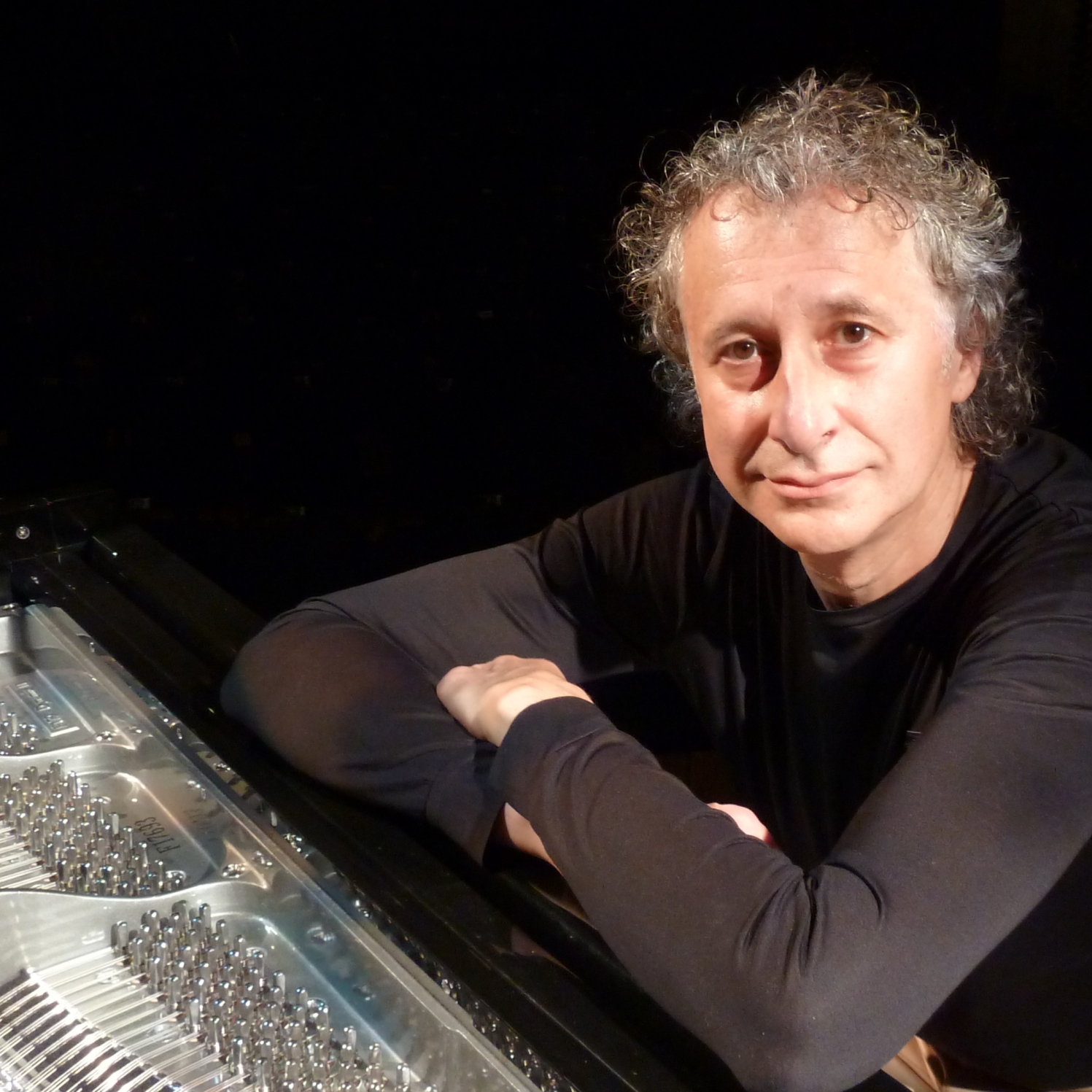

Background information
- Born: Dmytro George Morykit; 3 December 1956 (age 69); Northampton, England
- Genres: Soundtrack (Film score); Contemporary classical; Post-Romanticism; Medieval-Classic
- Occupations: Composer, pianist
- Website: dmytromorykit.co.uk

Dmytro Morykit (born 3 December 1956) is a British composer and pianist.

== Early life and education ==
Morykit was born in Northampton to a Ukrainian father and Italian mother, who were both displaced from their respective countries after World War II. He started playing the piano at five under the tuition of Christina Griffin and later, Graham Mayo. He won the prize for best original composition at the National Student Drama Festival in 1979 when Sebastian Graham Jones first recommended the prize. Clive Wolfe, Director of the NSDA later wrote in The Stage, "Mendelssohn and Co watch out! The new incidental music for the National Student Theatre Company's Christmas production of Twelfth Night is by 1979 NSDF best music award winner Dmytro Morykit (Nene College). It is strongly melodic with baroque undertones, creating mood and scene."

== Career ==
After visiting Richard Demarco in Edinburgh, Morykit made his home there in 1988. He worked on compositions for numerous collaborations with dance and theatre companies. Morykit accompanied Demarco and other artists on a cultural expedition to communist Poland in 1989.

Morykit was commissioned by Angus Calder and Amnesty International (Scotland) in 1996 for a performance of 12 poems with music for Commonwealth Head of States visit to Edinburgh, at the Queen's Hall, Edinburgh.

In 2007 he was commissioned by the Scottish Consul General of Ukraine to write a piece to commemorate the 75th anniversary of the Holodomor. The resulting collaboration with choreographer, Steinvor Palsson, was a dance film, Portrait of Evil. He has composed work for a number of short films and in 2010 with Brian May's permission, arranged the complete Bohemian Rhapsody music on piano to accompany the protest video, Donald Trump does Bohemian Rhapsody.

In 2014, Morykit created and performed a two-hour score to accompany the classic science fiction silent Metropolis. The score combines newly composed pieces with a number of Morykit's existing compositions. The performance and the composition received favourable reviews. The piece was first performed in Perthshire, and later Morykit toured the UK, Europe and Canada, returning to Wilton's Music Hall in London on several occasions.

In 2015, Morykit created and performed a new concert/score to accompany the classic silent film Nosferatu (1922) by F. W. Murnau. which was premiered for Halloween at the 14th C Leicester Guildhall before being toured.

Morykit's partner is the poet Hazel Cameron. They were interviewed about the impact of COVID-19 on their work by the Harry Ransom Center.
