= Oppenheimer (play) =

Play written by Tom Morton-Smith

- Written by: Tom Morton-Smith
- Based on: The life of J. Robert Oppenheimer

Premiere
- Date premiered: 15 January 2015
- Place premiered: Swan Theatre, Stratford-upon-Avon

Oppenheimer is a play by Tom Morton-Smith based on the life of physicist J. Robert Oppenheimer.

== Production history ==
The play was first presented by the Royal Shakespeare Company at the Swan Theatre, Stratford-upon-Avon from 15 January to 7 March 2015, before transferring to the Vaudeville Theatre in London's West End running from 27 March until 23 May.

The production was directed by Angus Jackson with a cast including John Heffernan as Oppenheimer; other cast members included Jamie Wilkes, Catherine Steadman, Ben Allen as Edward Teller, William Gaminara as General Leslie Groves, Ross Armstrong as Haakon Chevalier and Jack Holden as Robert Wilson.
