= Lucy Sullivan Is Getting Married =

Novel by Marian Keyes

- Author: Marian Keyes
- Language: English
- Genre: Fiction, humour, romance
- Publisher: Poolpeg
- Publication date: 1996
- Publication place: Ireland
- ISBN: 9780099489993
- Preceded by: Watermelon
- Followed by: Rachel's Holiday

Lucy Sullivan Is Getting Married is a 1996 novel by Irish author Marian Keyes. It chronicles the life of Lucy Sullivan, a 26-year-old perpetually broke, unlucky-in-love office worker from London, who has a penchant for bad boys, a needy, alcoholic and flawed father, a dead-end job and exasperating flatmates (dippy Charlotte and bossy Karen). The book is written in the first person and is described by Keyes as a "sideways" sequel to her first novel Watermelon.

The novel was adapted into a television series in 1999. It aired on the ITV network, but struggled with numerous scheduling changes. The series has aired internationally and has been released on DVD.

Author Keyes has said, "I'm very fond of that book and I think I have the most affection for Lucy Sullivan as a character. There's a lot of me in there [...] I wanted to write about a single girl in London who goes out with eejit after eejit, you know, because that was really the life I had led, and there was this strange culture of singleness I encountered and I found this very funny. Lucy's depressive, but she has a sense of humour, and that's why I like her."

== Plot ==
Lucy visits a fortune teller with her three mis-matched friends, and a marriage is predicted in her future. When the fortune-teller's prophecies for her friends come true, Lucy begins to suspect that she will soon be marrying. Lucy spends the following 12 months looking for Mr Right. Various eligible bachelors are introduced, among them Gus, Lucy's unreliable lover; Daniel, her oldest friend; Chuck, a handsome American; and Adrian, the video shop man. This is followed by a series of disastrous dates, drunken nights out, confessions and revelations.

== Reception ==
The success of the novel led to publishing deals of more than £600,000, one of the most lucrative ever achieved by an unestablished writer. In Ireland, the book went straight to number one and stayed there for nine weeks.

== TV adaptation ==
Lucy Sullivan Is Getting Married
- Genre: Romantic comedy
- Written by: Colin Brake
- Directed by: Brian Grant
- Starring: Sam Loggin; Gerard Butler; Zoë Eeles; Sara Stockbridge; Letitia Dean; Gwyneth Strong; Debbie Chazen; Michael Troughton
- Country of origin: United Kingdom
- Original language: English
- No. of episodes: 16

Production
- Executive producer: Brian Eastman
- Running time: 30 mins

Original release
- Network: ITV
- Release: 8 November 1999 – 26 December 2000

The novel was adapted into an 8-hour, sixteen part, television drama series by Carnival Films for the LWT network. It originally aired on ITV in November 1999. It was described as a "saga about broken hearts and terrifyingly unsuitable boyfriends" with "plenty of workplace-mileage to be extracted from Lucy's job at Nudawn Supplies". Sam Loggin played Lucy. Her flatmates, Charlotte, a promiscuous dippy blonde, and Karen, a bossy Scottish communal financer, were played by Letitia Dean and Zoë Eeles respectively. Other characters included Lucy's three colleagues: sensitive Meredia (Debbie Chazen), loud-mouthed Megan (Sara Stockbridge), and middle-class Hetty (Gwyneth Strong). The group of girls party their way around London looking for would-be husbands or boyfriends. Gerard Butler starred as Lucy's unreliable lover, Gus.

=== Scheduling ===
The series was launched with four episodes in its first week at 10:30pm on ITV, following which it aired once weekly. However, it failed to attract the young adult audience at which it was aimed, so the series was withdrawn (mid series, episode 9) from that timeslot in December 1999. The programme was subsequently aired a year later between November 2000 and January 2001, in the early evening, pre-watershed time slot at 17:05. LWT said, "the underlying tone and structure of the series was not dissimilar to that of the tea-time soaps and, given the wider audience available at that time, it was substantially edited and revoiced to make it suitable for the slot."

Despite this, the show drew complaints from viewers for featuring a sex scene and bad language. Complaints from viewers about the content of various editions of the series were upheld in part by the Independent Television Commission (ITC) in 2001. Nine complained of the inclusion of a lesbian storyline and kiss, while others believed that the sexual content, swearing and tasteless material were inappropriate for the time of transmission. In its report, the ITC said it had "serious concerns about the scheduling of a series which concentrated on the sexual relationships of a group of young adults, so early in the evening". A Standards Panel was concerned by the general nature and tone of the content, in particular the sexual themes in one episode, which it "considered were likely to have exceeded the expectations of the majority of the audience at a time when a large number of children would be available to watch it". It was concluded that certain episodes were, therefore, in breach of the Programme Code.

According to LWT, the series also failed to perform well in the earlier slot and was eventually withdrawn. It has since been repeated on ITV in a late night time slot at various times.

=== Cast ===
- Sam Loggin as Lucy Sullivan
- Letitia Dean as Charlotte
- Zoë Eeles as Karen
- Gwyneth Strong as Hetty
- Debbie Chazen as Meredia
- Sara Stockbridge as Megan
- Gerard Butler as Gus
- Cameron Jack as George
- Niall Buggy as Mr. Sullivan
- Frances Tomelty as Mrs. Sullivan
- Simon Greenall as Richard
- James Hillier as Steve
- Pascal Langdale as Daniel
- David Simeon as Ken
- Michael Troughton as Ivor
- Shirley Stelfox as Mrs. Nolan

=== Crew ===
- Writer: Colin Brake
- Directors: Brian Grant and Sarah Hellings
- Producer: Stuart Doughty
- Executive producer: Brian Eastman

=== DVD release ===
The entire series was released on DVD for the first time in Australia (Region 4) on Thursday 5 June 2008.
