= Attachments (TV series) =

British television comedy-drama series (2000–2002)

- Starring: Justin Pierre; Claudia Harrison
- Country of origin: United Kingdom
- No. of episodes: 26

Production
- Running time: 30 minutes
- Production company: World Productions

Original release
- Network: BBC Two
- Release: 26 September 2000 – 24 April 2002

Attachments is a BBC television comedy-drama that ran for two series from 2000 to 2002, with a total of twenty-six episodes. It focuses on a group of young professionals in London that work for an Internet startup company called "seethru" during the dot com boom. The fictional company ran an internet portal website at seethru.co.uk which was updated as the show progressed, and which remained on-line for some time after the end of the second series. The show was criticised by the Broadcasting Standards Commission for including excessive sexual content immediately after the watershed. The show was released on VHS, but has not been released on DVD.

== Characters ==
Seethru was started by Mike (Justin Pierre) and his wife Luce (Claudia Harrison). Other major characters include site designer Jake (David Walliams), content writer Sophie (Amanda Ryan), nerdy technology expert Brandon (Iddo Goldberg), and Reece Wilson (William Beck) and Will Newman (William Gaminara).
