= Michael Reardon (architect) =

British architect

Michael Reardon is an English architect, historic building consultant, and interior designer. He worked on the Swan Theatre (1986) in Stratford-upon-Avon, England, as well as being the inspecting architect for Birmingham's St. Philip's Cathedral and Hereford Cathedral.

His most notable project, the Swan Theatre, was aided by Tim Furby. The theatre was designed for The Royal Shakespeare Company within the red-brick gothic shell of the original (1879) Shakespeare Memorial Theatre and was completed in 1986.

Other projects include The Other Place (1974), also in Stratford, Riverside Studios (1975-6), and many properties for the National Trust.

== Sources ==
- Sally Beauman: The Royal Shakespeare Company: A History of Ten Decades, Oxford University Press (1983) ISBN 0192122096
- Marian Pringle: The Theatres of Stratford-upon-Avon 1875 – 1992: An Architectural History, Stratford upon Avon Society (1994). ISBN 0-9514178-1-9
