= Burnside (TV series) =

2000 British police procedural TV series

- Genre: Police procedural
- Starring: Christopher Ellison; Zoë Eeles; Justin Pierre; Andrew Readman; Paul Gilmore; John White; Shane Richie; Tony Selby; Paul Nicholas
- Composers: Sandy Nuttgens; Mike Scott
- Country of origin: United Kingdom
- Original language: English
- No. of series: 1
- No. of episodes: 6

Production
- Executive producer: Richard Handford
- Producer: Jamie Nuttgens
- Running time: 50 mins.
- Production company: Thames Television

Original release
- Network: ITV
- Release: 6 July – 10 August 2000

Related
- The Bill

Burnside is a British television police procedural drama, broadcast on ITV between 6 July to 10 August 2000. The series, a spin-off from ITV's long-running police drama The Bill, focused on DCI Frank Burnside, formerly a detective at Sun Hill and now working for the National Crime Squad. Burnside ran for one series of six episodes, structured as three two-part stories.

== Background ==
The lead character of the series was Detective Chief Inspector Frank Burnside, who had appeared in The Bill almost from its inception as a tough, no-nonsense antagonist to the station staff. Burnside disappeared in mysterious circumstances in 1993 and returned briefly five years later, when it was revealed that he had been working undercover. The main secondary characters were Detective Sergeant Dave Summers and Detective Constable Sam Phillips. Burnside's NCS team also included the minor characters of DC Pete Moss, played by John White, and DC Chris Gibson, played by Paul Gilmore. In addition, several recurring characters appeared throughout the series: Paul Nicholas played Ronnie "The Razor" Buchan, a former London gangster and Burnside's nemesis. Tony Selby played Jim Summers, the father of Dave Summers and Burnside's former boss. Shane Richie played Burnside's regular informant, Tony Shotton.

== Legacy ==
Reflecting on the series some years later, the actor who played Burnside, Christopher Ellison, was critical of the quality of its writing, suggesting it compared unfavourably with The Bill. In particular, he pointed to the absence of the character's trademark one-liner jokes, making the series "all so black and serious".

Interviewed on The Bill Podcast in 2019, Ellison said:

"I always thought a huge mistake they made when we did the spin-off series called Burnside was that they changed the format completely, and the one thing I always felt it lost was its humour. I know Burnside was a horrible character in a lot of ways but he was quite funny; he said funny things. And that was one of the most enjoyable things about it."

== Cast ==
- Christopher Ellison as DCI Frank Burnside
- Zoë Eeles as DC Sam Phillips
- Justin Pierre as DS Dave Summers
- John White as DC Pete Moss
- Paul Gilmore as DC Chris Gibson
- Andrew Readman as Supt. Brian Lee
- Paul Nicholas as Ronnie Buchan
- Tony Selby as Jim Summers
- Shane Richie as Tony Shotton

== Episodes ==
No.	Title	Directed by	Written by	Original release date	Viewers (millions)
1	"Back with a Vengeance"	Ian White	Lizzie Mickery	6 July 2000	7.45
2	"Back with a Vengeance"	Ian White	Lizzie Mickery	13 July 2000	7.39
After taking up a position with NCS, Burnside attempts to use his new-found status to collect information on Ronnie Buchan, an old-time adversary who was acquitted of shooting Burnside's friend and police partner Barry. However, upon his arrival, he is caught up in the midst of ongoing operation Gasgoyne, whilst also trying to identify who is responsible for an influx of guns and weaponry on the south coast. Choosing to ignore Supt. Brian Lee, Burnside and his new comrades Dave Sumers and Sam Phillips go on the hunt for Billy Holden, a small-time arms dealer suspected of being the importer of a new wave of high-powered guns. And when his best mate, Renfrew, decides to let his son one of Holden's guns, all hell breaks loose resulting in the death of eight teenagers. Determined to catch Holden in the act, making a deal with local gangster mob The Yardies, Burnside sets up his own covert operation to nail Holden before any further disasters. Or is he already too late?
3	"Exposed"	Bruce MacDonald	Lizzie Mickery	20 July 2000	6.56
4	"Exposed"	Bruce MacDonald	Lizzie Mickery	27 July 2000	6.11
A serial killer who strangles his female victims with a tie before shaving their pubic hair off is once again prime priority after the death of a fifteen-year-old school girl. Initially, her on-off boyfriend Jerry Forbes is suspected of the murders, having attended football matches in the locations on the days of the murders. However, Sam Phillips is not convinced, and determined to run with her own line of enquiry, decides to tackle local photographer Dave Evans, who despite his 'limp dick' seems the most likely suspect in her eyes. However, her intimacy with Dave, including allowing him to shave her, lands Sam in deep water with both Burnside and Supt. Lee. Not convinced that Evans is entirely concrete, Burnside pressures Sumers to continue with the Forbes angle. However, a reconstruction of the young girl's murder proves the turning point, which points fresh evidence towards Evans. But is Sam in too deep? And will her final sacrifice put her in danger?
5	"Trial By Fire"	Justin Hardy	Steve Griffiths	3 August 2000	5.91
6	"Trial By Fire"	Justin Hardy	Steve Griffiths	10 August 2000	5.66
When the trial of Dave Vickers sees him acquitted of murder, Burnside's informant Tony Shotton is forced to relocate himself to a quiet country retreat before Vickers and his mob catch up with him. Meanwhile, still on Vickers' trail, Burnside attempts to infiltrate Vickers' upcoming money laundering scam by taking out his lawyer and putting Summers undercover in his place. However, little does Summers know that somebody very close to home is leaking information to Vickers and his mob, which soon leads to the murder of Tony Shotton. Hellbent on getting revenge, Burnside decides to make Vickers' deal go tits up by setting fire to £100 million pounds that Vickers has stashed away ready to launder for the Russian Mafia. And when the mafia arrive in London looking for their dough, Burnside decides to give Vickers a do or die ultimatum – give himself up and spend time in jail, or let himself free to the mercy of the Russians. Meanwhile, old foe Ronnie Buchan resurfaces, and Burnside sees his chance to finally nail his arch enemy.

== Merchandise ==
=== DVDs ===
DVD release name	Episodes	Years of Series	UK Release Date (Region 2)	North American Release Date (Region 1)	Australian Release Date (Region 4)	Worldwide (Region 0)
Burnside: The Complete Series	1 to 6	2000	9 September 2013	N/A	18 August 2009	1 August 2012

=== Books ===
Book	Year Published	Cover Photo	Notes
Burnside: The Secret Files	17 July 2000	A Picture of Christopher Ellison and a checker band 3 quarters of the way down.	Paperback

== See also ==
- The Bill
- Murder Investigation Team
