= National Student Drama Festival =

Arts festival

- Genre: Arts festival
- Dates: 2022: 9–15 April (exact dates vary each year)
- Years active: 1956–present
- Founded: 1956; 70 years ago
- Website: nsdf.org.uk

National Student Drama Festival (NSDF) is a UK based organisation founded in 1956 with the purpose of creating new art, new artists and new communities. It also runs a charity aimed at empowering young artists. The NSDF was originally targeted towards people aged 16–25 years old; in 2021–22, the age bracket was extended to include 26-year olds.

NSDF is a year-round organization whose work peaks at its annual festival, held for one week in one chosen city. A daily magazine, Noises Off, is written by a team of writers and participants at the festival.

== History ==
The NSDF was founded in 1956 by the Sunday Times arts columnist Kenneth Pearson, Sunday Times theatre critic Harold Hobson, and National Union of Students (United Kingdom) president Frank Copplestone. Pearson went on to become the organization's first artistic director. Early supporters also included Sunday Times Editor Harry Hodson and Professor Glynne Wickham, a pioneer of the academic discipline of drama based at the University of Bristol.

Even before 1956, the National Union of Students had organised dramatic festivals, such as in 1947 at Birmingham, but this was the first year that it had been backed by the Sunday Times.

Scottish universities that were a part of the Scottish Union of Students were not allowed to participate until 1962, as universities not affiliated with the National Union of Students were not allowed to participate before that year.

Even after NSDF allowed Scottish universities, the SUS still ran their own Scottish Union of Students National Student Drama Festival from 1963 to 1967.

On its 50th anniversary in 2006, a book was published, called Fifty years of the National Student Drama Festival. It included a full list of shows for those 50 years.

=== International Student Drama Festival ===
In 2012, the festival expanded internationally as the International Student Drama Festival (ISDF), bringing student theatre companies from the UK and overseas to Sheffield. The programme included productions from a number of countries, alongside British student companies, and introduced an International Spirit Award intended to recognise collaboration between participants from different nations.

Past NSDF participants include Harold Pinter, Caryl Churchill, Meera Syal, Simon Russell Beale, Ruth Wilson, Marianne Elliott, and Lucy Prebble. Companies with past affiliation with NSDF include Slung Low, Jamie Lloyd Productions, RashDash, Barrel Organ and LUNG Theatre.

NSDF 22 took place from 9–15 April 2022 in Leicester.

NSDF 25 took place from 22–26 April 2025 after a break because of Covid.

== Key figures ==
=== Festival directors ===
- 1971 to 2000 – Clive Wolfe
- 2001 to 2003 – Nick Stimson
- 2004 to 2006 – Andrew Loretto
- 2007 to 2012 – Holly Kendrick
- 2013 to 2018 – Michael Brazier
- 2019 – James Phillips

=== Noises Off editors ===
- 1980 to 1990 – Stephen Jeffreys (latterly in tandem with Nick Phillips)
- 1991 to 2002 – Ian Shuttleworth
- 2003 to 2004 – Andrew Haydon and Rachel Smyth
- 2005 to 2009 – Andrew Haydon
- 2010 – Phil Mann and Claire Trévien
- 2011 – Andrew Haydon, Phil Mann and Claire Trévien
- 2012 – Phil Mann, Andrew Haydon and Claire Trévien
- 2013 to 2014 – Andrew Haydon
- 2015 – Jake Orr
- 2016 to 2017 – Richard Tzanov
- 2018 – Kate Wyver
- 2019 – Florence Bell and Naomi Obeng

Notable participants
- Erica Whyman
- Rosemary Squire
- Stephen Fry
- Abbi Greenland and Helen Goalen (RASHDASDH)
- Carrie Cracknell
- Ruth Wilson
- Lena Headey
- Wole Soyinka
- Sandi Toksvig
- Caryl Churchill
- Tim Fountain
- Nick Hern
- Biyi Bandele
- Terry Hands
- Nona Shepphard (director)
- Michael Boyd
- Robin Duval
- Sam Steiner (playwright)
- Braham Murray
- Olivia Vinall (actor)
- Khalid Abdalla
- Nikki Amuka-Bird
- Michael Attenborough
- Van Badham
- Patrick Barlow
- Simon Russell Beale
- Lorna Bennett
- Michael Billington
- David Farr
- Mark Gatiss
- Buzz Goodbody
- Robert Hewison
- Harold Hobson
- Angus Imrie
- Stephen Jeffreys
- Martin Jenkins (writer)
- Alex Jennings
- Daniel Kitson
- Roger Michell
- John Nettles
- Cyril Nri
- Steve Pemberton
- Ronald Pickup
- Tim Pigott-Smith
- Harold Pinter
- Pete Postlethwaite
- Lucy Prebble
- Mark Ravenhill
- Jan Sayer
- Prunella Scales
- Tim Supple
- Meera Syal
- Polly Teale
- Richard Thomas
- Glen Walford
- Timothy West
- Clive Wolfe
- Alan Yentob
- Dmytro Morykit

== Prize winners ==
Prizes are presented at the festival's closing ceremony. Some of these are named after prestigious theatrical institutions or people. The Buzz Goodbody Director Award was named after the first female director for the RSC, who attended the festival in 1967. Previous winners include Roland Smith (artistic director of Theatre Delicatessen), Phil Young, Jane Prowse, Fiona Clift and Richard Hurst.

2019 Prize Winners
| Award | Winner |
Judges' Awards
| Best Ensemble | Quick Duck Theatre (Magic Hour: The Murder Mystery Disco!) |
| Singularity of Vision | Will Jackson (Magic Hour: The Murder Mystery Disco!) |
| Acting | Maddy Strauss (Rotterdam) |
| Acting | Kate O'Gorman (A Girl Is a Half-Formed Thing) |
| Acting | John Broadhead (Killology) |
| Company Performance | Yen |
| Production Award for Profound Moments | Are You Still Watching |
| Achievement in Criticism | Emma Rogerson |
Named Awards
| Camden People's Theatre Award | How to Save a Rock |
| Clive Wolfe Award | Carly McIntosh |
| Sunday Times Playwriting Award | How to Save a Rock |
| Samuel French New Play Award | How to Save a Rock |
| Technical Production Award | Tristan Ashley (Killology) |
| Production Award for Exceptional Care | Things We Do Not Know |
| Slung Low Management Award | Shristi Ray |
| Spotlight Award | Grace Gallagher |
| Spotlight Award | Oscar Sadler |
| Sunday Times Harold Hobson Drama Critic Award | Joseph Weiner |
| The Holbeck Cup | Ugly Bucket |
| Buzz Goodbody Award | Matt Owen (Yen) |
| Stephen Jeffreys Award | Bost-Uni Plues |
| Outstanding Contributions to the Technical Team (with support from SLX and the Association of Sound Designers) | Anja Urban |
| Outstanding Contributions to the Technical Team (with support from SLX and the Association of Sound Designers) | Joseph Pilling |
| Outstanding Contributions to the Technical Team (with support from SLX and the Association of Sound Designers) | Melissa Chan |

2017 prize Winners
| Award | Winner |
Named awards
| The Buzz Goodbody Director Award | Ellie Gauge (Thick Skin) |
| The Stage UK Directors Award | Josie Davies (Say It Loud) |
| The Cameron Mackintosh Award | Alex Mackinder (Ordinary Days) |
| The Sunday Times Harold Hobson Drama Critic Award | Lily James |
| Theatre Record Critics Award | Florence Bell |
| The Sunday Times Playwriting Award | Ben Kulvichit & Clara Potter Sweet (Celebration) |
| Spotlight Most Promising Actor | Harvey Comerford (Hidden & Thick Skin) |
| Spotlight Most Promising Actor | Annie Davison (Swallow) |
| Outstanding Contribution to the Technical Team supported by SLX | Sam Levy |
| Outstanding Contribution to the Technical Team supported by SLX | Sam Costelloe |
| Outstanding Contribution to the Technical Team supported by SLX | Mel Wells |
| Management Team Award | Chris Bell |
| Camden People's Theatre Award | Josie Davies |
| Samuel French New Play Award | Caitlin McEwan (Thick Skin) |
| Oberon Books New Play Award | Miriam Schechter (Blackbird) |
| Freckle Productions Family Show Award | Emergency Chorus (Celebration) |
| The Festgoers' Award | Celebration |
Judges Awards
| Outstanding Achievement in Design | David Callanan for Nothing Is Coming, The Pixels Are Huge |
| Outstanding Achievement in Music and Composition | Oscar Lane, Oliver Rudge and the band from O Collective for he she they |

2016 prize Winners
| Award | Winner |
Named awards
| The Buzz Goodbody Director Award | Modupe Salu (I Can't Breathe) |
| The Stage UK Directors Award | Joe Bunce (Departures: A Song Cycle) |
| The Cameron Mackintosh Award | Departures: A Song Cycle |
| The Sunday Times Playwriting Award | Joe Bunce (Departures: A Song Cycle) |
| The Sunday Times Harold Hobson Drama Critic Award | Kate Wyver |
| Spotlight Most Promising Actor | Bróccán Tyzack-Carlin (The Addams Family) |
| Spotlight Most Promising Actor | Modupe Salu (I Can't Breathe) |
| The Festgoers' Award | The Addams Family |
| Management Team Award | Oscar Owen |
Judges' Awards
| Acting | Sadie Fitch Kempner for Morticia in The Addams Family |
| Acting | Becca Jones for Sylv in West |
| Choreography | Will Emery for The Addams Family |
| Composition | Matthew Malone for Departures |
| Contribution to the Festival | Durham University Light Opera Group for Kiss Me Kate and The Addams Family |
| Creative Collaboration | The Company for Daniel (Footprint Theatre) |
| Design | James Bailey for Departures |
| Directing and Casting | Josie Davies for Over There |
| First Time Directing | Jenny Walser for Cock |
Judges' Commendations
| Acting | Shannon Smith for Mike in West |
| Acting | Bryony Davies for Karl in Over There |
| Comedy | Harvey Comerford and Dominic McGovern for the Gangsters in Kiss Me Kate |
| Composition | Ronan Hatful for Over There |
| Directing | Elin Schofield for Daniel |
| Supporting Actor | Jennifer Bullock for Wednesday in The Addams Family |
| Supporting Actor | James Roscow for Ken and Pat in West |
| Supporting Actor | Harry Adair for Lurch in The Addams Family and General Harrison in Kiss Me Kate |

2015 prize Winners
| Award | Winner |
Named awards
| The Buzz Goodbody Director Award | Joe Bunce for The Nutcracker |
| The Directors' Guild Award | Matt Stevens-Woodhead for The 56 |
| The Cameron Mackintosh Award | The Creative Team and Company of The Nutcracker |
| Spotlight Most Promising Actor Award | Vincenzo Monachello for his performance in Parade |
| Spotlight Most Promising Actor Award | Dannielle Phillips for her performance in The 56 |
| The Sunday Times Harold Hobson Drama Critic Award | Eve Allin |
| Theatre Record Critics Award | Becky Shepherson |
| The Sunday Times Playwriting Award | Josh Overton for Angry |
| Outstanding Contribution to the Technical Team supported by Stage Electrics | Jasmin Davies |
| Outstanding Contribution to Sound supported by Shure and The Association of Sound Designers | Ali Stringer |
| Outstanding Contribution to Lighting supported by Ambersphere | Caoimhe Young |
| Management Award | Aisling Gallagan |
| The Festgoers Award | The Ritual Slaughter of Gorge Mastromas |
Judges’ Awards
| Outstanding Performance in a Musical | Georgina Ambrey for The Baker's Wife in Into The Woods |
| Musical Direction | Ash Jacobs for Into The Woods |
| Ensemble | The 56 |
| Theatrical Imagination | The Nutcracker |
| Choreography | Beth Hinton-Lever for Parade |
Judges' Commendations
| Acting | Euan Kitson for his performance in Lemons, Lemons, Lemons, Lemons, Lemons |
| Acting | Miriam Schechter for her performance in The Nutcracker |
| Playwriting | Sam Steiner for Lemons, Lemons, Lemons, Lemons, Lemons |
| Musicianship | The Band of Into The Woods |
| Directing and Producing | Ellie Gauge and Sophie McQuillan for Congestion |
| Sound and Music Design | James Melling and David Denyer for The Bacchae |
| Lighting and Design | Aaron Smith for The Dumb Waiter |
| Mise En Scene | David Johnson-Morgan and India Smith for Wastwater |
| Contribution to Technical Team | Fiona Porritt and Conor Morris |
| Contribution to Sound | Olga Kravchenko |
| Contribution to Lighting | Laura Heinl |

2014 prize Winners
| Award | Winner |
Named awards
| Buzz Goodbody Director Award | Ali Pidsley for Road & Nothing |
| The Sunday Times Play Writing Award | Lucyna Raczka for Nothing |
| The Directors’ Guild Award | Genevieve Skehan for Spring Awakening The Musical |
| Cameron Mackintosh Award | Spring Awakening The Musical |
| The Sunday Times Harold Hobson Student Drama Critic Award | Billy Barrett |
| Theatre Record Young Critic's Award | Georgia Snow and Adam Foster |
| Spotlight Most Promising Actor Award | Angus Imrie for Brink, Skin-Lad, Blowpipe, Soldier, Barry in Road |
| Spotlight Most Promising Actress Award | Katherine Thorogood for Stalker in Nothing |
| Sound Award supported by Sennheiser and The Association of Sound Designers | George Veys |
| Lighting Award supported by Ambersphere | Ruth Luckins |
| Technical Achievement Award supported by Stage Electrics | Matthew Norwood |
| Management Team Award | Alex Williams |
| Festgoers Award | The Duck Pond |
Judges’ Company Awards
| Creative Risk | Nothing |
| Ensemble | Road |
| Collaborative Creation | The Duck Pond |
Judges’ Company Commendation
| Ensemble | Punk Rock |
Judges’ Individual Awards
| Musical Direction | Katy Richardson for Americana |
| Musical Performance | Verity Blythe for Peaches in Americana |
| Spirit Of Invention | Tom Coxon for The Duck Pond |
| Performance | Beth Holmes for Louise, Molly, Mrs Bald and Scotch Girl in Road |
Judges’ Individual Commendations
| Performance | Barnaby Chambers for Bennett in Punk Rock |
| Video Design | Stevie Partington for Enron |
| Writing | Jenna May Hobbs for Your Fragrant Phantom |
| Musical Performance | Hannah Bloom for Wendla in Spring Awakening |
| Musical Performance | Laura Johnson for Jackson in Americana |

2012 International Student Drama Festival (ISDF) prize Winners
| Award | Winner |
|---|---|
| Buzz Goodbody Student Director Award | Nozomi Matsumori (New National Theatre Drama Studio, Japan) |
| Directors' Guild Award | Harry Williams (Leeds University) |
| Sunday Times Harold Hobson Student Drama Critic Award | David Ralf (Oxford University) |
| Theatre Record Young Critic's Award | Rosie Curtis (Edinburgh University) |
| Cameron Mackintosh Award | Sweeney Todd (Newcastle University) |
| The Sunday Times Playwriting Award | Nader Fridman (Kibbutzim College, Israel) |
| Judges' Award for International Spirit | Ashtar Theatre (Palestine); Intombi Zomqangala School of Arts (Zimbabwe); Kibbutzim (Israel) |
| Judges' Award for Acting | Tainai (New National Theatre Drama Studio, Japan); Moderate Light Fastness (Cologne University, Germany) |
| Judges' Award for Theatre Magic | If Room Enough (Giggleswick School) |
| Judges' Award for Devised Production | Inheritance Blues (Leeds) |
| Judges' Award for Adaptation | The Lives They Left Behind (North West Kent College) |
| Spotlight's Awards for Acting | Milly Falkner-Lee (Newcastle); Mariam Nadiradze (Shota Rustaveli Theatre & Film State University, Georgia); Tom Coxon and Chloe Crenigan for If Room Enough (Giggleswick School); Nader Fridman and Zili-Hen Sacks (Kibbutzim, Israel); Mariel Pettee (Harvard, America); Phoebe Sparrow (Leeds) |
| Judges' Award for Sound | Ayumi Higuchi (New National Theatre Drama Studio, Japan) |
| Judges' Award for Lighting | James Shaw (North West Kent) |
| Judges' Award for Costume | Bronya Arciszewska (Oxford) |
| Judges' Award for Design | Moderate Light Fastness (Cologne University, Germany) |
| Stage Electrics Award for Sound, with Sennheiser | Rebecca Carter (Leeds) |
| Stage Electrics Award for Lighting, with Martin Professional | Emma Toozs (Hull University) |
| Technical Achievement | Shiri Stern (Birkbeck, London) |
| Front of House Award | James Barker and Freddy Porter (Hull, Scarborough Campus) |
| Festgoers' Award | Inheritance Blues (Leeds) |

2009 prize Winners
| Award | Winner |
|---|---|
| Critic's Award | Jennie Agg (Manchester) |
| Buzz Goodbody Student Director Award | Caitlin McLeod (Warwick) |
| Directors' Guild Award | Clive Judd (Manchester) |
| Cameron Mackintosh Award | Adam Alston (Warwick) |
| International Playscript Competition | Claire Urwin (Manchester) |
| Spotlight Award for Outstanding Performance | Edward Franklin (Manchester) |
| Sunday Times Harold Hobson Student Drama Critic Award | Richard T Watson (Hull) |
| Theatre Record Young Critic's Award | Jamie Gladstone (Edinburgh) |
| Judges' Award | Ensemble, Elephant's Graveyard (Warwick) |
| Creative Landscape | Return to the Silence (Warwick) |
| Comedy | The Wake (East Anglia) |
| Musical Narrative | Sad Since Tuesday (Giggleswick School) |
| Choreography | Never Enough (Hull) |
| Acting | Simon Longman, Mark Weinman and Elie Rose (Manchester); Paddy Loughman (Edinburgh) |
| Judges' Commendation | Ensemble, Vowel Play (Darlington) |
| Creative Landscape | Tub (East Anglia); The Last Yak (Edinburgh) |
| Lighting Design | Rhys Thomas (Warwick) |
| Showlight | Elliot Griggs (Warwick) |
| Set Design | Sara Verkert (Warwick) |
| Sound Design | Ant Lynch (Warwick) |
| Stage Electrics Award – Lighting (in association with Martin Professional) | Zoe Hughes (Hull); commendation: Lauren Bettyes (Peterborough Regional College) and Emma Gregory (Hull) |
| Stage Electrics Award – Sound (in association with Sennheiser) | Abigail Richardson (York); commendation: Lewis Fowler (Kent) |
| Technical Achievement | Stuart Berryman (Durham); commendation: Amber Hine (Hull) and Colin Paxton (Bath) |
| Arden Entertainment Show Award | Ben Canning (Warwick) |
| Stephen Joseph Theatre Production Award | Grace Stead (John Moores) |
| Hull University Scarborough Campus Local Organiser Award | Katie Munroe-Farlie (Hull) |
| Festgoers' Award by popular vote | Normal (Edinburgh); Never Enough (Hull) |

=== References ===
General

- 'Raw Talent: Fifty Years of the National Student Drama Festival' (ISBN 1-84002-553-0).
- 'NSDF Programme 2010' (printed and distributed by the Festival)
- 'NSDF Programme 2011'
