= Buzz Goodbody =

British theatre director (1946–1975)

- Born: Mary Ann Goodbody; 25 June 1946; London, England
- Died: 12 April 1975 (aged 28); London, England
- Education: Sussex University
- Occupation: Theatre director
- Years active: 1967–1975

Mary Ann "Buzz" Goodbody (25 June 1946 – 12 April 1975) was an English theatre director. Associated with the Royal Shakespeare Company (RSC) for almost all of her short career, Goodbody is remembered for her sometimes politically charged experimental work, and for establishing the RSC's first studio theatre in Stratford, The Other Place. She was the RSC's first female director.

== Biography ==
=== Early life and education ===
Mary Ann Goodbody was born in Marylebone, London, on 25 June 1946. She was raised in St John's Wood and Hampstead, and gained her nickname as a toddler as a consequence of her very active and curious inclinations. Her father was a barrister who spent a considerable amount of time in Africa and the Far East, with the result that Goodbody and her brother were largely brought up by their mother and nanny.

Goodbody was educated at Roedean and the newly founded Sussex University. A member of the Communist Party of Great Britain from the age of 15, according to her brother, she was very much against applying for a place at Oxford or Cambridge.

Acting in university student productions was frustrating for her. She once noted "All the best roles" – those she found interesting such as the lead in Henry V – "are written for blokes"; this was the catalyst that led her towards directing plays as a career.

While at Sussex, where the main component of her degree was English Literature, she adapted and staged Dostoyevsky's novella Notes from Underground as part of her honours thesis. This production won an award at the National Student Drama Festival, and was staged briefly at the Garrick Theatre in the West End. The Sunday Times contributor Hunter Davies recalled interviewing Goodbody in 1966. He "found her so fascinating, remarkable, outspoken, opinionated – someone who seemed to sum up the spirit of our new universities, if not the 1960s – that [he] decided to put her in a [never-completed] book". In September 1967, she married Edward Buscombe, a University of Sussex film student; the marriage ended in divorce in 1971.

=== Royal Shakespeare Company ===
Goodbody first joined the Royal Shakespeare Company (RSC) in 1967 as director John Barton's personal assistant, after he had been impressed by a London performance of Notes from Underground. Some tasks Barton initially gave her suggested that the appointment was not quite as positive as it seemed, but Goodbody reassured herself that it was at least a foot in the door at the RSC. As well as undertaking research for Barton, she also served as a dramaturg for Terry Hands, and officially became an assistant director from 1969.

She became involved in Theatregoround, a project to develop smaller-scale productions of Shakespeare, which included her productions in Stratford of King John, which was also seen at the Roundhouse in London, and the Elizabethan play Arden of Faversham, now attributed in part to Shakespeare, in 1970. According to Colin Chambers the production of the rarely performed King John was "much maligned but hugely entertaining". Peter Brook thought the production had "vigour" and was "full of life, energetic, disrespectful". She was the first female director to work for the RSC.

A feminist involved in the Women's Movement, Goodbody was a founding member of the Women's Street Theatre Group in 1970, along with another theatre director, Lily Susan Todd. Michèle Roberts, later a novelist, was also involved. The group was committed to "telling people who don’t know’" about the movement's agenda performing in locations like markets and shopping malls. Goodbody and others from the group were arrested in London during the Festival of Light in 1971. Their counter demonstration featured a tableau in which were displayed placards saying "Fuck the F*mily". Goodbody was fined.

Goodbody directed Trevor Griffiths' Occupations in 1971 at The Place, a venue off the Euston Road in London then being used by the RSC. Goodbody though was accused by some on the Left of "romantic idolisation" of the Italian Communist Antonio Gramsci (played by Ben Kingsley), a central character in the work.

In November 1971, her production of a documentary play, The Oz Trial, was first performed. It was derived by David Illingworth from the transcripts of the more than six-month-long obscenity trial of the three editors of Oz magazine. In staging the play, it was claimed by commentators that the RSC had gone beyond what a publicly funded body should do. Goodbody, described by one pundit as "a young and militant lady director", firmly believed that the RSC should be involved in responding to current events.

Her 1973 modern dress production of As You Like It was criticised at the time for seeming to be without any distinction between the court and the countryside. She observed of the play: "Hardly anyone seems to do any work: the shepherds and shepherdesses ... are not really country people. I see them as art college students — drop-outs who live in the country and have mummies and daddies in town with large incomes". It was a feminist interpretation, with Eileen Atkins in the lead as Rosalind, and Richard Pasco as Jacques. It was a popular production with audiences.

==== The Other Place ====
Goodbody played an instrumental role in establishing the RSC's studio theatre The Other Place. In 1973, she worked with Trevor Nunn on his season of Shakespeare's Roman plays. In December, she sent a memo to Nunn, then the RSC's artistic director, arguing for a "studio/second auditorium" aimed at the local population who she thought were "notoriously hostile to us". The proposal was accepted and in the following year she became an associate director, in charge of The Other Place.

The Other Place was put forth as an alternative and more experimental venue than the larger Royal Shakespeare Theatre. There, Goodbody staged King Lear (1974) and Hamlet (1975). Of the latter, The Times theatre critic Irving Wardle wrote: "an astounding revelation of the most excavated play in the world, ranking with Peter Brook's A Midsummer Night's Dream as the key classical production of the decade". Of the actors in her production, the reviewer Peter Thomson was of the opinion that, "they meant what they said" and Goodbody had "coaxed the play into their hands and they respected it". Her production of King Lear ran in New York to a positive reviews.

=== Death and legacy ===
Goodbody died by suicide at her home in Islington on 12 April 1975, aged 28, shortly after her production of Hamlet had opened. The National Student Drama Festival named a directorial award in her honour. Pam Gems created the character of "Fish" in Dusa, Fish, Stas and Vi in memory of Goodbody. BBC theatre critic John Elsom wrote that her suicide "robbed the theatre of one of its most promising directors."
