= Erica Whyman =

Deputy Artistic Director at the Royal Shakespeare Company

Erica Whyman, OBE (born 27 October 1969) is an English theatre director who became deputy artistic director at the Royal Shakespeare Company in January 2013.

== Background ==
Whyman was born in Harrogate, Yorkshire, but lived in Barnsley until aged eight, before her family moved to Surrey. She studied French and Philosophy at Oxford University and theatre with Philippe Gaulier at École Philippe Gaulier in Paris and then at the Bristol Old Vic Theatre School. Whyman was the Chief Executive at Northern Stage, Newcastle upon Tyne, from 2005 to 2012.

In 2013, Whyman became deputy artistic director of the Royal Shakespeare Company. In September 2021, she became acting artistic director of the RSC.

== Personal life and honours ==
In 2013, she was appointed an OBE in the New Year Honours List. She has a daughter, Ruby, with playwright Richard Bean.

== Career ==
- 1997 – Awarded the John S Cohen Bursary for Directors at the National Theatre Studio
- 1997–98 – Associate producer of Tricycle Theatre
- 1998–2000 – Associate director of English Touring Theatre
- 1999–2001 – Artistic director Southwark Playhouse (Peter Brook Empty Space Award)
- 2001–04 – Artistic director and chief executive of Gate Theatre
- 2004–05 – Fellow of the Clore Leadership Programme in the first cohort
- 2005–2012 – Chief executive of Northern Stage, Newcastle upon Tyne (TMA Award for Theatre Manager of the Year, 2012)

=== Northern Stage productions ===
- Son of Man (2006)
- Ruby Moon (2007)
- Our Friends in the North (2007)
- A Christmas Carol (2007)
- A Doll's House (2008)
- Look Back in Anger (2009)
- Hansel and Gretel (2008)
- Oh What a Lovely War (2010, nominated for two TMA awards)
- The Wind in the Willows (2010)
- Who's Afraid of Virginia Woolf (2011)
- The Glass Slipper (2011)
- Oh, The Humanity (2012)
- The Borrowers (2012)

=== Royal Shakespeare Company productions ===
- The Christmas Truce (2014)
- Hecuba (2015)
- A Midsummer Night's Dream: A Play for the Nation (2016)
- The Seven Acts of Mercy (2016)
- The Earthworks (2017)
- Romeo and Juliet (2018)
- Miss Littlewood (2018)
- The Winter's Tale, broadcast on BBC Four (2021)

=== Other productions ===
- The Winter's Tale (2000, Southwark Playhouse)
- Les Justes (2001, Gate Theatre)
- Witness (Gate Theatre, 2002)
- Marieluise (Gate Theatre, 2004)
- The Flu Season (Gate Theatre, 2003)
- The Shadow of a Boy (National Theatre, 2002)
- The Birthday Party (Sheffield Crucible, 2002)
