= Justin Pierre (actor) =

British actor

Justin Pierre is a British actor working in theatre, film and television. His numerous roles have included Prince Ivar/Mystic Knight of Water in Saban's Mystic Knights of Tir Na Nog, Mike in World Productions series Attachments (BBC) and Dave Summers in the series Burnside (ITV), and he appeared in Guillermo del Toro's Hellboy II: The Golden Army.

== Biography ==
Pierre is a British Actor and has appeared as Detective Sergeant Dave Summers on the British television police procedural Burnside, as well as Mike on the BBC's Attachments. He also appeared in the American-German film Hellboy II: The Golden Army by Oscar-winning director Guillermo del Toro.

He graduated from the Rose Burford College of Speech and Drama and performed in numerous theatrical productions before taking to the screen. Some of his theatrical roles include (Othello) directed by Sam Walters, Tybalt (Romeo & Juliet) and (Generations of the Dead) at the Young Vic (London).
