= Sam Loggin =

British actress (born 1977)

- Born: Samantha Loggin; 1977 (age 47–48); Northamptonshire, England, UK.
- Occupation: Actress
- Years active: 1996–present

Samantha "Sam" Loggin (born 1977) is an English actress. She was born in Northamptonshire, UK. Her noteworthy performances include the roles of Lucy in Lucy Sullivan Is Getting Married and Anna in Girls in Love.

== Filmography ==
Year	Film	Role	Notes
1996	Pie in the Sky	Jude O'Brien	TV series (2 episodes)
1997	Peak Practice	Stacey	TV series (1 episode: "Letting Go")
1997	The Missing Postman	Patricia Flint	
1997	Trial & Retribution	Madeleine Gillingham	TV series (2 episodes)
1997	Dangerfield	JoJo	TV series (4 episodes)
1997	Dream Team	Zoe Baker	TV series
1998	Underground	Raver's Friend	
1999	Every Woman Knows a Secret	Cat	TV series (2 episodes)
2000	The Law	Anna Damon	TV movie
2000	Waking The Dead	Kelly Caldwell	TV series (2 episodes)
1999	Lucy Sullivan is Getting Married	Lucy Sullivan	TV series (16 episodes)
2001	The Bill	Ruth Mitcham	TV series (3 episodes)
2001	Starhunter	Electra	TV series (2 episodes)
2001	Baddiel's Syndrome	Dorotha	TV series (2 episodes)
2001	Now You See Her	Rosie	TV movie
2001	The Late Twentieth	Jane	
2002	Casualty	Claire	TV series (5 episodes)
2002	Silent Witness	Laura Stevens	TV series (1 episode: "The Fall Out Part 1")
2003–2005	Doctors	Penny Murphy	TV series (1 episode: "Drinking Games")
2003	Girls in Love	Anna	TV series (27 episodes)
2006	Press Play	Sonja Osborne	Short
2006	Here to Stay	The Woman	Short
2009	Demons	Kirsty Dunelm	TV series (1 episode: "The Whole Enchilada")
2009	The Bill	Laura Tambling	TV series (2 episodes)
