= Royal Shakespeare Company =

British theatre company

The Royal Shakespeare Company
- Abbreviation: RSC
- Predecessor: Shakespeare Memorial Theatre Ltd.
- Formation: 23 April 1879
- Founder: Peter Hall
- Founded at: Stratford-upon-Avon
- Type: Theatre group
- Legal status: Charity incorporated under royal charter
- Purpose: Promote Shakespeare's plays to a truly diverse audience and their relevance to today's society.
- Headquarters: Stratford-upon-Avon
- Location: United Kingdom
- Patron: Charles III
- Artistic director(s): Daniel Evans and Tamara Harvey
- Main organ: Board of Trustees
- Income: £92.1m (2024)
- Expenses: £87.9 million (2024)
- Endowment: £86.43 million (2019)
- Staff: 1205 (2019)
- Website: rsc.org.uk

The Royal Shakespeare Company (RSC) is a major British theatre company, based in Stratford-upon-Avon, Warwickshire, England. The company employs more than 1,000 staff and opens around 20 productions a year. The RSC plays regularly in London, Stratford-upon-Avon, and on tours across the UK and internationally.

The company's home is in Stratford-upon-Avon, where it has redeveloped its Royal Shakespeare and Swan theatres as part of a £112.8-million "Transformation" project. The theatres re-opened in November 2010, having closed in 2007.

As well as the plays of Shakespeare and his contemporaries, the RSC produces new work from living artists.

== Company history ==
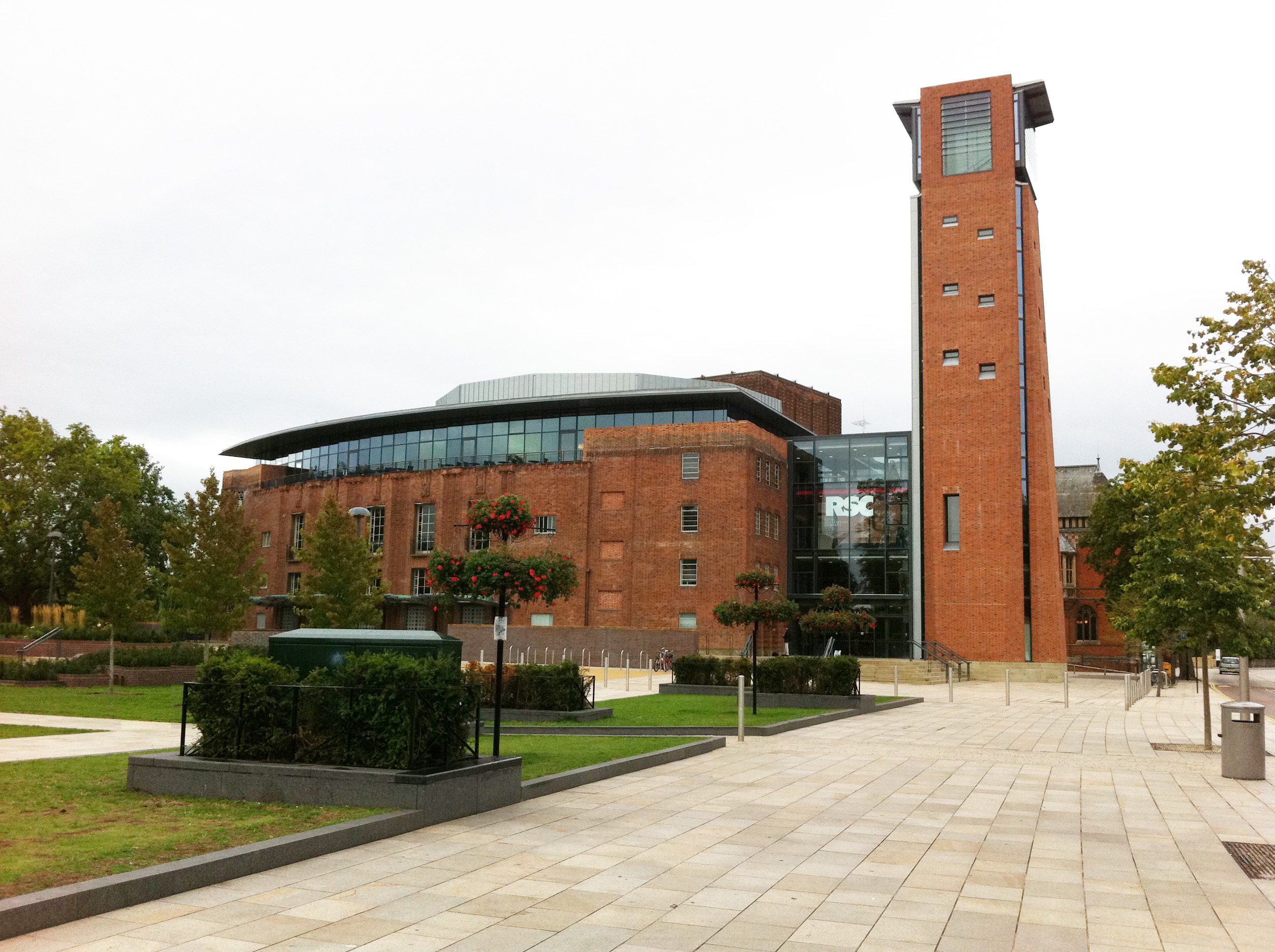
Renovated Royal Shakespeare Theatre in Stratford-upon-Avon in 2011

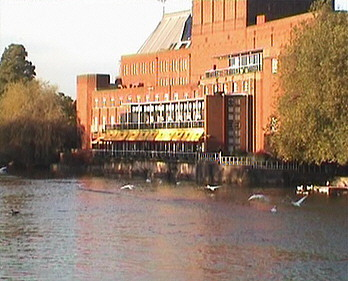
Royal Shakespeare Theatre in Stratford-upon-Avon in 2003

=== The early years ===
There have been theatrical performances in Stratford-upon-Avon since at least Shakespeare's day, though the first recorded performance of a play written by Shakespeare himself was in 1746 when Parson Joseph Greene, master of Stratford Grammar School, organised a charitable production to fund the restoration of Shakespeare's funerary monument. John Ward's Birmingham-based company, the Warwickshire Company of Comedians, agreed to perform it. A surviving copy of the playbill records that the company performed Othello. The first building erected to commemorate Shakespeare was David Garrick's Jubilee Pavilion in 1769, and there have been at least 17 buildings used to perform Shakespeare's plays since.

The first permanent commemorative building to Shakespeare's works in the town was a theatre built in 1827, in the gardens of New Place, but has long since been demolished. The RSC's history began with the Shakespeare Memorial Theatre, which was the brainchild of a local brewer, Charles Edward Flower. He donated a 2-acre (0.81 ha) site by the River Avon and in 1875 launched an international campaign to build a theatre in the town of Shakespeare's birth. The theatre, a Victorian-Gothic building seating just over 700 people, opened on 23 April 1879, with a performance of Much Ado About Nothing, a title which gave ammunition to several critics.

The Memorial, a red-brick Gothic cathedral, designed by Dodgshun and Unsworth of Westminster, was unkindly described by Bernard Shaw as "an admirable building, adaptable to every purpose except that of a theatre." From 1919, under the direction of William Bridges-Adams and after a slow start, its resident New Shakespeare Company became one of the most prestigious in Britain. The theatre received a royal charter of Incorporation in 1925, which gave it status.

On the afternoon of 6 March 1926, when a new season was about to commence rehearsals, smoke was seen. Fire broke out, and the mass of half-timbering chosen to ornament the interior provided dry tinder. By the following morning the theatre was a blackened shell. The company transferred its Shakespeare festivals to a converted local cinema. Fund-raising began for the rebuilding of the theatre, with generous donations arriving from philanthropists in America.

In January 1928, following an open competition, 29-year-old Elisabeth Scott was unanimously appointed architect for the new theatre which became the first important work erected in the United Kingdom from the designs of a female architect. George Bernard Shaw commented that her design was the only one that showed any theatre sense. Her modernist plans for an art deco structure came under fire from many directions but the new building was opened triumphantly on William Shakespeare's birthday, 23 April 1932. Later it came under the direction of Sir Barry Jackson in 1945, Anthony Quayle from 1948 to 1956 and Glen Byam Shaw 1957–1959, with an impressive roll-call of actors. Scott's building, with some minor adjustments to the stage, remained in constant use until 2007 when it was closed for a major refit of the interior.

Timeline

- 1932 – New Shakespeare Memorial Theatre opens, abutting the remains of the old.
- 1961 – Chartered name of the corporation and the Stratford theatre becomes "Royal Shakespeare".
- 1974 – The Other Place opened, created from a prefabricated former store/rehearsal room in Stratford.
- 1986 – The Swan Theatre opened, created from the shell of the 1879 Memorial Theatre.
- 1991 – Purpose-built new Other Place, designed by Michael Reardon, opens.
- September 2004 – The vision for the renewal of the Royal Shakespeare Theatre transformation is announced.
- July 2006 – The Courtyard Theatre opens with a staging of Michael Boyd's Histories.
- November 2010 – The Royal Shakespeare and Swan Theatres re-open following their transformation.
- March 2016 – The Other Place was reinstated as a 200-seat studio theatre.

=== The RSC ===
==== Foundation and history ====
In 1959, while still the director-designate of the Memorial Theatre, Peter Hall announced that the formation of a permanent company would be a primary objective. David Addenbrooke wrote of Hall's belief that Shakespeare, more than any other dramatist, needed a "style", a tradition and unity of direction and acting. On 14 January 1960, Hall's first policy statement as director also proposed the acquisition of a second theatre, in London, to be used as a city outlet for selected Stratford productions. The RSC was formally established on 20 March 1961 with the royal announcement that the Shakespeare Memorial Theatre would henceforth be known as the Royal Shakespeare Theatre and the company as the Royal Shakespeare Company.

The critic Michael Billington, summarising these events, wrote: "In 1960 the twenty-nine-year-old Peter Hall formally took charge at Stratford-upon-Avon and set about turning a star-laden, six-month Shakespeare festival into a monumental, year-round operation built around a permanent company, a London base and contemporary work from home and abroad. Looking back, it is difficult to realise just how radical Hall's dream was at the time; or indeed how much opposition there was to the creation of what became officially known in March 1961 as the Royal Shakespeare Company."

John Barton had been appointed associate director in January 1960, and was followed in 1962 by Michel Saint-Denis, Peter Brook and Clifford Williams who joined the company as resident directors. John Bury was appointed head of design in 1964. The repertoire was also widened to take in modern work and classics other than Shakespeare.

In 1962, strong opposition to the establishment of a London base for the RSC came from the Royal National Theatre which – led by Viscount Chandos and Laurence Olivier – wished to be the sole subsidised company operating in London. Following a deal with Prince Littler, managing director of Associated Theatre Properties, the RSC established the Aldwych Theatre as its London base for productions transferred from Stratford to London, its stage redesigned to match the RST's apron stage.

Twenty years later, in the summer of 1982, the company took up London residence in both the Barbican Theatre and The Pit studio space in the Barbican Centre under the auspices of the City of London. The RSC was closely involved in the design of these two venues. In 2002 it left the Barbican after a series of allegedly poor seasons, partly because the then artistic director Adrian Noble wanted to develop the company's touring performances. His decision means the company has no regular London home.

==== Innovation and growth ====
The RSC had first tackled its need for a small auditorium in 1971. At the insistence of Sir Trevor Nunn (who had taken over as artistic director in 1968), the company hired The Place off the Euston Road in London and constructed its own theatre space for an audience of 330, seated on raked wooden benches. Two seasons of plays were staged in 1972 and 1973, none suitable for the Aldwych. In December 1973 Buzz Goodbody, the company's first female director, drew up a plan for what would become The Other Place studio theatre in Stratford, designed by Michael Reardon to seat 140 people, which opened to a first and highly successful season in 1974. The name chosen for the new studio space was favoured within the company because it implied an alternative theatre, but also because it is a quotation from Hamlet.

In August 1976, Nunn staged Macbeth with a minimalist set at The Other Place, playing for 2 hours 15 minutes without an interval. The small, nearly round stage focused attention on the psychological dynamics of the characters. Both Ian McKellen in the title role and Judi Dench as Lady Macbeth received exceptionally favourable reviews. The production transferred to London, opening at the Donmar Warehouse in September 1977 before its further transfer to the larger Young Vic venue for a two-month season. It was also recorded for transmission by Thames Television. In 2004, members of the RSC voted Dench's performance the greatest by an actress in the history of the company.

Summing up this triumphant period, The Guardian critic Michael Billington later wrote: "[In 1977] the RSC struck gold. This was, in fact, the perihelion of Trevor Nunn's ten-year reign as the company's sole Artistic Director and Chief Executive (in 1978 he began to share power with Terry Hands). In London, the company opened a new studio space at the Donmar Warehouse with plays by Barker, Taylor, Bond and Brecht. Its Aldwych repertory combined the usual Stratford transfers with Nichol's Privates on Parade, Ibsen's Pillars of the Community and Brecht's The Days of the Commune. At the Royal Shakespeare Theatre, Terry Hands and actor Alan Howard had a marathon year working on Henry V, a virtually uncut, Henry VI, Part 1, Henry VI, Part 2 and Henry VI, Part 3 and Coriolanus. And the action at The Other Place included Jonson, Ford, Musset, Gems and Rudkin. No other company in the world could match that output for quantity and quality".

Nunn and Hands were joint artistic directors of the RSC when the company opened The Swan, its third theatre in Stratford. The Swan Theatre, also designed by Michael Reardon, has a deep thrust stage and a galleried, intimate 450-capacity auditorium. The space was to be dedicated to playing the works of Shakespeare's contemporaries, the works of European writers and the occasional work of Shakespeare. The theatre was launched on 8 May 1986 with a production of The Two Noble Kinsmen by William Shakespeare and John Fletcher (not published until 1634 and thought to be Shakespeare's last work for the stage). It was directed by Barry Kyle.

==== Costumes and props ====
The RSC's costume department is 'the largest in-house costume-making workshop in British theatre' and 'world-renowned'. In 2021, the RSC raised over £8 million for a project to update the costume and prop department. Alistair McArthur, head of costume, called the old working space "Dickensian" and added, "If we knew there was rain coming we'd have to clear everything off the table the night before."

The prop-makers design and make many of their own props for the many productions. A 'Prop Shop' in Stratford-upon-Avon is the studio in which most of the props are made.

==== Troubled times ====
Nunn (who had been appointed to follow Hall's tenure at the National Theatre in 1968) ceded his RSC executive directorship in 1986 to his co-artistic director Terry Hands, who bore the brunt of media hostility during a difficult few years for the company. Hands took the decision to suspend the RSC's residency at The Barbican Theatre and The Pit during the winter season of 1990–91, thus vacating the capital for the first time in 30 years. This was seen as essential if the RSC was to secure an increase in subsidy from the Arts Council.

Shortly after that decision Adrian Noble returned to the RSC to take over from Hands as artistic director and chief executive. The company had serious funding problems. Noble's decision to sever all RSC connections with the Barbican Centre, funded by the Corporation of the City of London, was widely condemned, and towards the end of his tenure things began to go terribly wrong, partly through his pursuit and support of the so-called Project Fleet, a radical scheme aimed at rescuing the RSC from its financial crisis by replacing the Royal Shakespeare Theatre with a crowd-pleasing "Shakespeare Village" and streamlining the company's performance structure and ensemble principle.

==== A 21st-century renaissance ====
None of Noble's plans came to fruition. He left the job an unhappy man in March 2003. Michael Boyd then assumed control of the RSC, now burdened with a deficit of £2.8 million. By a combination of artistic excellence and quiet husbandry, including a year-long Complete Works of Shakespeare Festival (begun in April 2006 in collaboration with other theatre companies) plus a financially successful London season at the Novello Theatre in 2006, Boyd slowly rebuilt the company's fortunes and reputation.

In 2007, he launched the long-awaited Stratford theatre redevelopments, including construction of the temporary Courtyard Theatre while work was in progress, designed to house his RSC Histories cycle before its transfer to the Roundhouse in London in 2008. Talking of these achievements with typical modesty he told the Evening Standard in December 2007 ("The Man Who Remade the RSC"): "There was a bit of gardening to do, but we are now beginning to show signs of walking the walk." "The Histories" ensemble went on to win three Olivier awards in 2009. In addition, that same year the RSC commissioned a completely new edition of Shakespeare's First Folio, titled "William Shakespeare Complete Works" and published by Modern Library.

To provide balance, Simon Trowbridge in A Royal Shakespeare Company Book, published in 2017, is highly critical of aspects of the Boyd years, including his decision to redevelop the Royal Shakespeare Theatre as a second Swan Theatre.

The RSC is the sole British member theatre of the Union of the Theatres of Europe.

In March 2008, the RSC launched a manifesto 'Stand up for Shakespeare', a campaign to promote a positive experience of Shakespeare for children and young people. The tenets of this manifesto, Do It on Your Feet, See It Live, Start It Earlier form the basis of the work of the Education department.

In 2010, the RSC opened a new suite of education spaces on Waterside. The same year, the Christmas show Matilda the Musical opened at the Courtyard Theatre before transferring to London's West End in November 2011 where it is currently running, winning numerous awards (including a record-breaking 7 Laurence Olivier Awards), The production has also transferred to Broadway from 2013 to 2017 and worldwide and in 2022 was adapted into a film for Netflix.

In 2011, BP began to subsidised the RSC's £5 ticket scheme for 16 to 25-year-olds.

In summer 2011 the company undertook a residency in Park Avenue Armory, New York, running a series of performances and an accompanying education programme in partnership with the NYC Department of Education.

In 2012, the RSC produced the World Shakespeare Festival, a celebration of 'Shakespeare as the world's playwright' working with UK and international arts organisations, and including the Globe to Globe Festival by Shakespeare's Globe. The same year, planning permission was granted by Stratford District Council to reinstate The Other Place. Funding for the new theatre came from a £3 million grant from the Arts Council England, raised through the National Lottery. Funding was also received from the Gatsby Charitable Foundation, The Backstage Trust, and from public donations; this is the final phase of the Transformation project.

Live from Stratford-upon-Avon, a new project to broadcast the company's productions in cinemas around the world and stream them into schools was announced in May 2013. The project began with Shakespeare's Richard II, starring David Tennant, in November 2013, and followed up with Henry IV parts 1 and 2 and The Two Gentlemen of Verona in 2014.

In February 2016, Artistic Director Gregory Doran's productions of Henry IV Part I and Henry IV Part II, and Henry V went on tour in Shanghai, Beijing and Hong Kong as part of the King & Country Tour. The same year, the Royal Shakespeare Company also opened their first permanent exhibition, entitled The Play's The Thing.

On 23 April 2016, the RSC performed a one-night extravaganza, called 'Shakespeare Live!'. Broadcast on BBC Two from the Royal Shakespeare Theatre, it marked the 400th anniversary of Shakespeare's Death. It involved a collection of Shakespeare scenes and monologues with appearances from David Tennant, Catherine Tate, Dame Judi Dench, Benedict Cumberbatch and even one from Prince Charles.

In June 2019, the actor Mark Rylance resigned from the RSC over its sponsorship deal with oil company BP.

In October 2019, the RSC announced that it would be ending its partnership with BP at the end of year following criticism of its association with the oil company. A week before, school students threatened to boycott the theatre company if it did not sever links with the firm. A spokesperson for the RSC explained that "Young people are now saying clearly to us that the BP sponsorship is putting a barrier between them and their wish to engage with the RSC".

In February 2021, the RSC announced five new members to its board of trustees: Andrew Miller, Amanda Parker, Winsome Pinnock, Justine Themen and Ayanna Thompson.

It was announced that Daniel Evans and Tamara Harvey would become joint Artistic Directors from June 2023. Their first season was announced on 16 January 2024 commencing from April.

== Artistic directors ==
- Peter Hall (1960–1968)
- Trevor Nunn (1968–1978)
- Trevor Nunn and Terry Hands (1978–1986)
- Terry Hands (1986–1991)
- Adrian Noble (1991–2003)
- Michael Boyd (2003–2012)
- Gregory Doran (2012–2022)
- Erica Whyman (2021–2023) (Acting Artistic Director)
- Daniel Evans and Tamara Harvey (2023– )

== Theatres ==
The RSC has three permanent theatres in Stratford-upon-Avon:

- The Royal Shakespeare Theatre, a 1,060-seat theatre with thrust stage (re-opened 24 November 2010 after Transformation project)
- The Swan Theatre, a smaller thrust stage, capacity 469
- The Other Place, a studio theatre, rehearsal room and development space that opened in April 2016

The Courtyard Theatre was built as a temporary replacement for The Other Place theatre to house the company's work when the RST and Swan were closed for the Transformation project. It provided a full-scale working prototype for the new RST's auditorium, seating 1,045 people around a thrust stage. It was also used in 2012 for productions in the World Shakespeare Festival including Much Ado About Nothing in an Indian setting. The Courtyard Theatre was replaced by The Other Place, which was reinstated as a 200-seat studio theatre in 2016. In July 2021, a temporary 500-seat outdoor theatre was built in the Swan Gardens named the Lydia & Manfred Gorvy Garden Theatre. The theatre was built due to the COVID-19 pandemic to allow productions to return following the Government guidance, beginning with Phillip Breen's production of The Comedy of Errors running during summer 2021. The theatre was resurrected and renamed as The Holloway Garden Theatre for the summer 2024 production of As You Like It, directed by Brendan O'Hea.

The company's London presence has included tenancies of the Aldwych Theatre, The Place in Duke's Road, Euston, the Donmar Warehouse in Covent Garden, the Barbican Theatre and The Pit at the Barbican Centre in the City of London. There have also been seasons at The Mermaid Theatre, the Almeida Theatre (1988 and 1989), the Roundhouse in Camden, the Young Vic, the Playhouse Theatre, the Novello Theatre and the Gielgud Theatre.

The Theatre Royal in Newcastle upon Tyne is the third home of the Royal Shakespeare Company, alongside Stratford-upon-Avon and London.

== Key productions ==
- Coriolanus, directed by Peter Hall and starring Laurence Olivier as Coriolanus, Vanessa Redgrave as Valeria, Robert Hardy as Sicinius Velutus, Edith Evans as Volumnia, and Albert Finney and Mary Ure as Roman citizens. (1959)
- King Lear, directed by Peter Brook and starring Paul Scofield as Lear, Irene Worth as Goneril, Patience Collier as Regan, Diana Rigg as Cordelia, Peter Jeffrey as the Duke of Albany, Tony Church as the Duke of Cornwall, Alan Webb as the Earl of Gloucester, Tom Fleming as the Earl of Kent, Brian Murray as Edgar, James Booth as Edmund, Clive Swift as Oswald, and Alec McCowen as the Fool. (1962)
- Measure for Measure directed by John Blatchley and starring Marius Goring as Angelo, Judi Dench as Isabella, Tom Fleming as Vincentio, Ian Richardson as Lucio, Peter Jeffrey as Escalus, Clive Swift as Pompey and Ian Holm as Claudio. (1962)
- The Wars of the Roses, adaptation of the Henry VI and Richard III plays, directed by Sir Peter Hall and starring Ian Holm as Richard III, David Warner as Henry VI, Peggy Ashcroft as Margaret of Anjou, Donald Sinden as the Duke of York, Paul Hardwick as the Duke of Gloucester, Janet Suzman as Joan of Arc, Brewster Mason as the Earl of Warwick, Roy Dotrice as Edward IV. (1963)
- Marat/Sade by Peter Weiss, directed by Peter Brook and starring Ian Richardson as the herald, Clive Revill as Marat, Patrick Magee as de Sade and Glenda Jackson as Charlotte Corday. (1964)
- The Homecoming by Harold Pinter, world premiere directed by Peter Hall (June 1965)
- Staircase with Paul Scofield and Patrick Magee (1966)
- Hamlet directed by Peter Hall with David Warner in the title-role (1965)
- A Midsummer Night's Dream, directed by Peter Brook (1970)
- Enemies by Maxim Gorky, adapted by Jeremy Brooks, starring Helen Mirren as Tatyana, directed by David Jones (1971)
- Old Times by Harold Pinter directed by Peter Hall (1971)
- Julius Caesar directed by Trevor Nunn (1973)
- Antony and Cleopatra directed by Trevor Nunn starring Janet Suzman (1973)
- Richard II, directed by John Barton, starring Ian Richardson and Richard Pasco, alternating the roles of Richard and Bolingbroke (1973–74)
- Travesties by Tom Stoppard, starring John Wood, world premiere directed by Peter Wood (June 1974)
- The Marrying of Ann Leete by Harley Granville Barker, starring Mia Farrow, directed by David Jones (September 1975)
- Hamlet, starring Ben Kingsley, directed by Buzz Goodbody (1976)
- Romeo and Juliet, starring Ian McKellen and Francesca Annis, directed by Trevor Nunn (March 1976)
- Much Ado About Nothing, starring Judi Dench and Donald Sinden, directed by John Barton (April 1976)
- The Iceman Cometh by Eugene O'Neill, with Alan Tllvern taking over the role of Hickey from the indisposed Ian Holm, directed by Howard Davies (May 1976)
- The Comedy of Errors, a musical by Trevor Nunn and Guy Woolfenden (September 1976)
- Wild Oats by John O'Keeffe, starring Alan Howard and Jeremy Irons, directed by Clifford Williams (December 1976)
- Macbeth, directed by Trevor Nunn starring Judi Dench and Ian McKellen (1976–77)
- Privates on Parade by Peter Nichols, world premiere directed by Michael Blakemore (February 1977)
- Destiny by David Edgar, world premiere directed by Ron Daniels (May 1977)
- Twelfth Night directed by Jon Amiel with Ian McKellen, Bob Peck, Edward Petherbridge and Roger Rees (1978)
- The Greeks directed and adapted from Aeschylus, Euripides and Sophocles by John Barton (1980)
- The Life and Adventures of Nicholas Nickleby adapted for the stage by David Edgar with music by opera composer Stephen Oliver, world premiere directed by Trevor Nunn and John Caird (1980), winner of a Drama Desk Special Award in 1982
- Carrie, based on Stephen King's 1974 horror novel, directed by Terry Hands with a book by Lawrence D. Cohen, lyrics by Dean Pitchford, and music by Michael Gore. The Royal Shakespeare Company co-produced the Pre-Broadway try-out in the U.K.
- King Lear directed by Adrian Noble starring Michael Gambon and Antony Sher (1992)
- Much Ado About Nothing directed by Terry Hands starring Derek Jacobi and Sinéad Cusack
- Richard III, directed by Bill Alexander starring Sir Antony Sher (1984)
- Les Misérables by Claude-Michel Schoenberg and Alain Boublil, adapted and directed by Trevor Nunn and John Caird (1985–2019)
- Les liaisons dangereuses by Christopher Hampton starring Alan Rickman, Lindsay Duncan, and Juliet Stevenson, world premiere directed by Howard Davies (1985)
- Macbeth directed by Adrian Noble starring Jonathan Pryce (1986)
- Titus Andronicus directed by Deborah Warner starring Brian Cox (1988)
- The Plantagenets adaptation of Henry VI, Part 1, Part 2 and Part 3 and Richard III, directed by Adrian Noble, starring Anton Lesser as Richard III, Ralph Fiennes as Henry VI and David Waller as Duke of Gloucester (1988)
- Othello directed by Trevor Nunn with Willard White as Othello and Ian McKellen as Iago (1989)
- The Master Builder directed by Adrian Noble starring John Wood (1989)
- The Winter's Tale directed by Adrian Noble (1992)
- Hamlet directed by Adrian Noble starring Kenneth Branagh (1992)
- King Lear directed by Adrian Noble starring Robert Stephens and Simon Russell Beale (1993)
- Coriolanus directed by David Thacker starring Toby Stephens (1994)
- This England: The Histories, a season of all Shakespeare's sequential history plays (2000)
- Alice in Wonderland and Through the Looking-Glass by Lewis Carroll, adapted by Adrian Mitchell, directed by Rachel Kavanaugh (2001)
- Hamlet directed by Michael Boyd starring Toby Stephens (2004)
- The Crucible by Arthur Miller directed by Dominic Cooke (2006)
- Pericles directed by Dominic Cooke (2006)
- Repertory performances of King Lear and The Seagull starring Ian McKellen and Frances Barber, directed by Trevor Nunn (2007)
- Margaret Atwood's The Penelopiad, directed by Josette Bushell-Mingo and produced by Peter Hinton-Davis, was a co-production between the Royal Shakespeare Company (RSC) and the National Arts Centre of Canada (2007).
- The Histories in Stratford-upon-Avon and at the Roundhouse (2008)
- Hamlet directed by Gregory Doran, with David Tennant as Hamlet and Patrick Stewart as Claudius (2008)
- Roald Dahl's Matilda the Musical, book by Dennis Kelly, music and lyrics by Tim Minchin, directed by Matthew Warchus (2010)
- Love's Labour's Lost directed by Christophe Luscombe, with Edward Bennett and Michelle Terry (2014)
- Wolf Hall based on the two novels by Hilary Mantel, adapted for the stage by Mike Poulton, directed by Jeremy Herrin, produced in London's West End and on Broadway (2015).
- Oppenheimer by Tom Morton-Smith, directed by Angus Jackson and starring John Heffernan as J Robert Oppenheimer. (2015)
- The Tempest directed by Gregory Doran, with Simon Russell Beale and Mark Quarterly, designed by Stephen Brimson Lewis, in collaboration with Intel and The Imaginarium Studios.
- Imperium (play cycle): Conspirator and Imperium: Dictator adapted from Robert Harris' trilogy by Mike Poulton, with Richard McCabe as Marcus Tullius Cicero and Peter De Jersey as Gaius Julius Caesar (2017, Stratford Season) (2018, London Transfer).
- Antony and Cleopatra directed by Iqbal Khan, with Josette Simon and Antony Byrne in the title roles (2017).
- Coriolanus directed by Angus Jackson, with Sope Dirisu as Coriolanus (2017).
- Angus Jackson also directed Julius Caesar in 2017.
- Titus Andronicus directed by Blanche McIntyre, with David Troughton in the title role (2017).
- Adrian Edmondson starred as Malvolio in Christopher Luscombe's Twelfth Night (2017).
- Gregory Doran directed a puppet-based production of Venus and Adonis in 2017.
- Simon Godwin directed Paapa Essiedu in Hamlet in Stratford-upon-Avon in 2016, before it came back for a UK tour and shows in America in 2018.
- King Lear, directed by Gregory Doran and with Antony Sher in the title role, premiered in 2016 and was revived for a short run in 2018.
- Macbeth directed by Polly Findlay, with Christopher Eccleston and Niamh Cusack (2018).
- Romeo and Juliet directed by Erica Whyman, premiered in 2018, with a UK tour scheduled for 2019.
- The Merry Wives of Windsor directed by Fiona Laird (2018).
- Troilus and Cressida directed by Gregory Doran, with music from Evelyn Glennie (2018).
- Timon of Athens directed by Simon Godwin (2018).
- The Boy in the Dress based on the novel by David Walliams, book by Mark Ravenhill, music and lyrics by Robbie Williams and Guy Chambers, directed by Gregory Doran (2019)
- The Comedy of Errors directed by Phillip Breen (2021)
- Kate DiCamillo's The Magician's Elephant, book and lyrics by Nancy Harris, music and lyrics by Marc Teitler, directed by Sarah Tipple (2021)
- Richard III directed by Gregory Doran, starring Arthur Hughes (2022)
- Studio Ghibli's My Neighbour Totoro adapted by Tom Morton-Smith, directed by Phelim McDermott (2022)
- Cowbois by Charlie Josephine, co-directed by Charlie Josephine and Sean Holmes (2023)
- A Midsummer Night's Dream directed by Eleanor Rhode, starring Mathew Baynton (2024)
- Kyoto by Joe Murphy and Joe Robertson, directed by Stephen Daldry and Justin Martin, starring Stephen Kunken (2024)
- Twelfth Night directed by Prasanna Puwanarajah, starring Freema Agyeman and Samuel West (2024)
- Hamlet directed by Rupert Goold, starring Luke Thallon, Jared Harris, Nancy Carroll and Elliot Levey (2025)
- Cyrano de Bergerac by Edmond Rostand, in a new version by Simon Evans and Debris Stevenson, directed by Simon Evans, starring Adrian Lester and Susannah Fielding (2025)
- George R.R. Martin's Game of Thrones: The Mad King by Duncan Macmillan, directed by Dominic Cooke (2026)

== See also ==
- Theatre of the United Kingdom

== Sources ==
- Addenbrooke, David: The Royal Shakespeare Company: The Peter Hall Years, William Kimber (1974) ISBN 0-7183-0103-X
- Adler, Steven: Rough Magic: Making Theatre at the Royal Shakespeare Company, Southern Illinois University Press (2001) ISBN 978-0-8093-2377-7
- Beauman, Sally: The Royal Shakespeare Company: A History of Ten Decades, Oxford University Press (1982) ISBN 0-19-212209-6
- Hall, Peter: Making an Exhibition of Myself: The Autobiography of Peter Hall, Sinclair-Stevenson (1993) ISBN 1-85619-165-6
- Pringle, Marian: The Theatres of Stratford-upon-Avon 1875–1992: An Architectural History, Stratford upon Avon Society (1994) ISBN 0-9514178-1-9
- Trowbridge, Simon: The Company: A Biographical Dictionary of the Royal Shakespeare Company, Oxford: Editions Albert Creed (2010) ISBN 978-0-9559830-2-3
- Trowbridge, Simon: A Royal Shakespeare Company Book, Oxford: Englance Press (2017) ISBN 978-1-9997305-3-6
- Theatre Record and its annual Indexes
- RSC programme notes (including those for Richard II at the Courtyard, August 2007)
