= Swan Theatre, Stratford-upon-Avon =

Theatre in Stratford-upon-Avon, England

Coordinates: 52.1904°N 1.7044°W

Swan Theatre
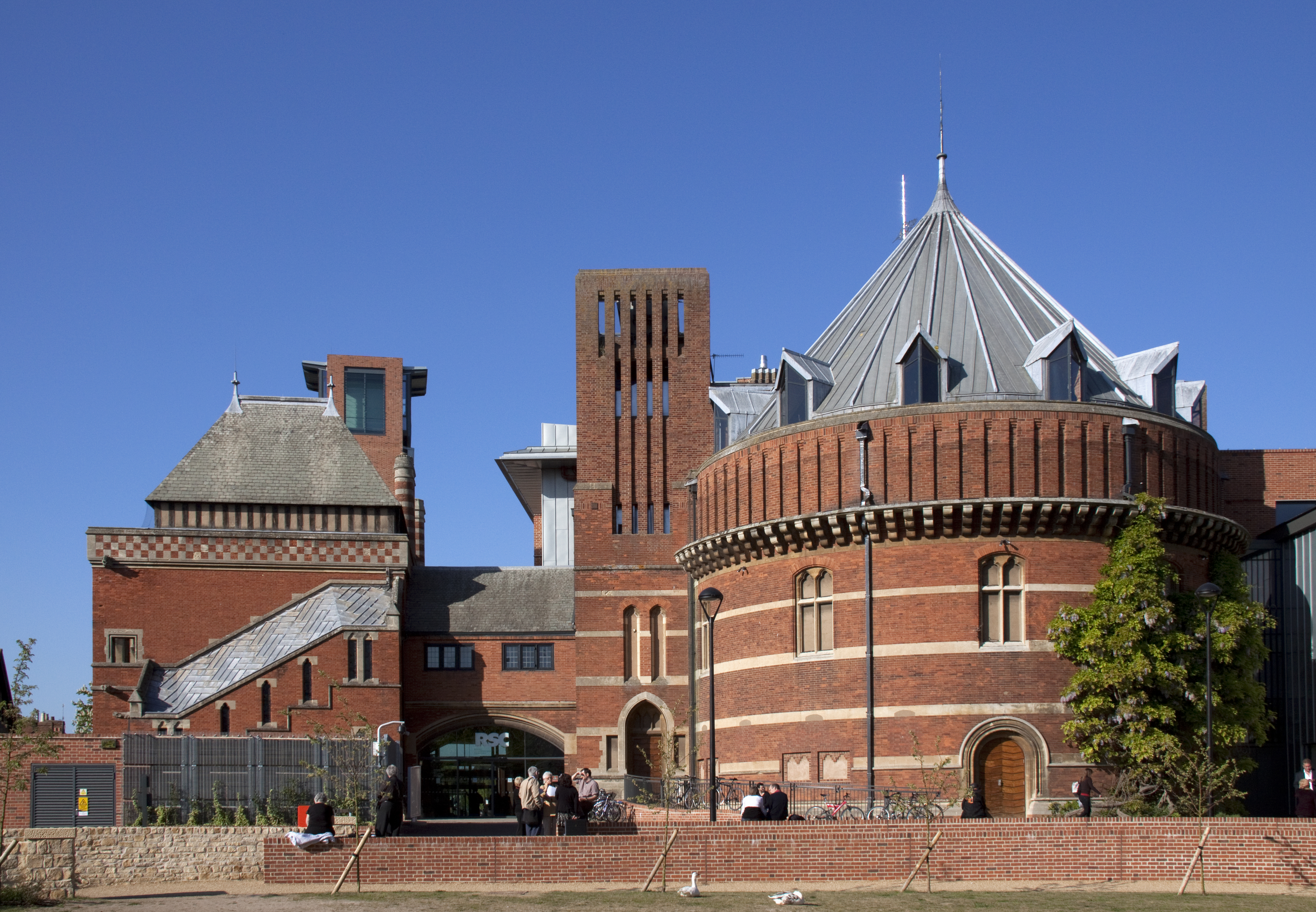
- Swan Theatre Stratford
- Interactive map of Swan Theatre
- Address: Waterside; Stratford-upon-Avon; Warwickshire; CV37 6BB; United Kingdom
- Owner: Royal Shakespeare Company
- Capacity: 450
- Type: Thrust stage
- Public transit: Stratford-upon-Avon railway station

Construction
- Opened: 1986
- Architect: Michael Reardon

Website
- rsc.org.uk/visit-us/swan/

The Swan Theatre is a theatre belonging to the Royal Shakespeare Company in Stratford-upon-Avon, England. It is built on to the side of the larger Royal Shakespeare Theatre, occupying the Victorian Gothic structure that formerly housed the Shakespeare Memorial Theatre that preceded the RST but was destroyed by fire in 1926.

Trevor Nunn and Terry Hands were joint artistic directors of the RSC when the company opened The Swan. Designed by Michael Reardon, it has a deep thrust stage, and is a galleried, intimate auditorium holding around 450 people.

The space was to be dedicated to playing the works of William Shakespeare's contemporaries, the works of European writers and the occasional work of Shakespeare.

The Swan Theatre's opening season was in 1986. The theatre was launched on 8 May 1986 with a production of The Two Noble Kinsmen by William Shakespeare and John Fletcher (not published until 1634 and thought to be Shakespeare's last work for the stage). It was directed by Barry Kyle.

On 13 November 1986 The Queen visited Stratford-upon-Avon to open the Swan Theatre. The official opening ceremony was held during the day and in the evening The Fair Maid of the West, directed by Trevor Nunn was staged in front of an invited audience.

The Swan has subsequently been used for many other types of drama including the works of Chekhov, Ibsen and Tennessee Williams.

Between January 2022 and April 2023 the Swan Theatre was refurbished as part of the Royal Shakespeare Company's £112.8 million transformation project. Improvements to the Swan include re-carpeting of the auditorium on all levels and re-upholstering of seats. The project also saw the installation of a new induction hearing loop, an upgrade to the sound and lighting infrastructure and the replacement of the air conditioning system which has enabled roof-space to be freed up, returning the capability for flying and hanging scenic items over the stage. The project also enabled a number of structural changes, so the Swan Theatre now has more storage space and shares back-of-house and public spaces with the Royal Shakespeare Theatre. The two theatres are linked together for the first time by a new Colonnade.

The Transformation project included new facilities and public spaces for the Royal Shakespeare and Swan Theatres – a Rooftop Restaurant with views over the River Avon, a Riverside Cafe and Terrace, the PACCAR Room exhibition space, a 36m high tower which provides circulation and outstanding views from its 32m-high viewing platform, a new public outdoor space, Weston Square, to connect the theatre with the old medieval town to the west, and a riverside walk which stretches from the Bancroft Gardens, past the theatre, towards Holy Trinity Church.

The whole building is now accessible for the first time for all visitors, performers and staff. Both the Royal Shakespeare and Swan Theatres opened in November 2010 for preview events and activities in advance of the first full Shakespeare performances from the RSC's existing repertoire from February 2011. The first new productions designed specifically for the transformed stages began from April, with Gregory Doran's production of Cardenio opening in the Swan Theatre as part of the RSC's 50th Birthday Season celebrations which ran from April to December 2011.

In 2011 the theatre (with the Royal Shakespeare Theatre), won a British Construction Industry Award.

Noted metalworker Antony Robinson, whose works appear in the Victoria and Albert Museum, designed and crafted the wind vanes and door handles of the theatre for the 1986 construction.
