= Gwyneth Herbert =

Jazz musician, singer-songwriter and composer

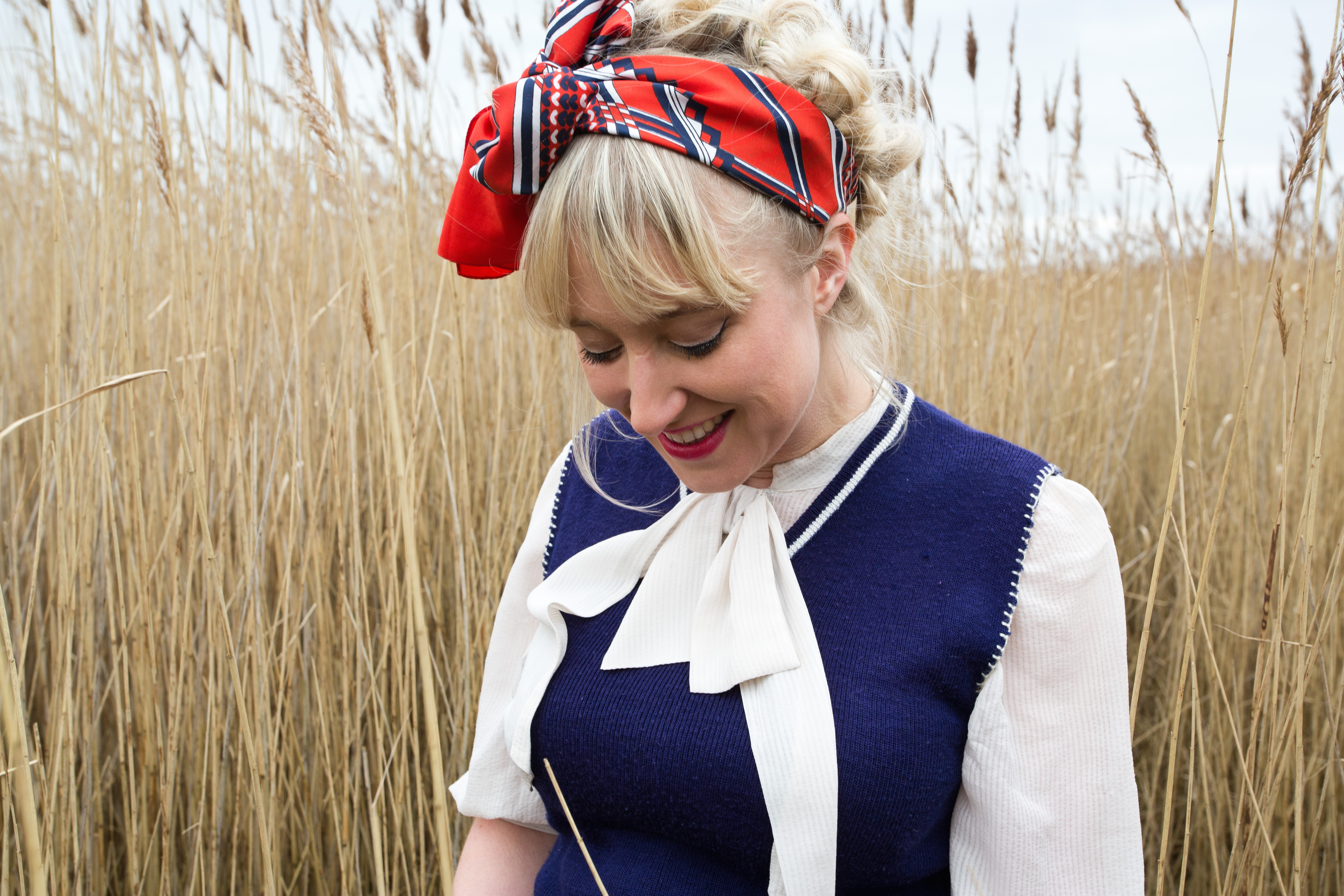
- Gwyneth Herbert

Background information
- Born: 26 August 1981 (age 45); Wimbledon, London, England
- Genres: singer-songwriter; jazz; musical theatre; composer
- Instruments: vocal, piano, ukulele, melodica, french horn, kazoo
- Years active: 2002–present
- Labels: Monkeywood Records; Naim Records
- Website: gwynethherbert.com

Gwyneth Herbert (born 26 August 1981) is a British singer-songwriter, composer, multi-instrumentalist and record producer. Initially known for her interpretation of jazz and swing standards, she is now established as a writer of original compositions, including musical theatre. She has been described as "an exquisite wordsmith" with "a voice that can effortlessly render any emotion with commanding ease" and her songs as being "impressively crafted and engrossing vignette[s] of life's more difficult moments".

Three of her seven albums have received four-starred reviews in the British national press. Another album, Between Me and the Wardrobe, received a five-starred review in The Observer. She wrote and performed a new song cycle, The Sea Cabinet, for which she was commissioned by Snape Maltings as artist-in-residence and which she subsequently recorded as an album. Theatre Elision gave the song cycle its United States premiere at The Southern Theater in Minneapolis, Minnesota.

== Early life and education ==
Born in Wimbledon, London, to Mary and Brian Herbert, she was brought up in Surrey and Hampshire in the south of England. She began playing the piano at the age of three and was writing basic songs at the age of five. She also learned the French horn, achieving Grade 8 by the age of 15. Throughout her teenage years she played music with local orchestras and bands such as the Surrey County Youth Orchestra and also briefly formed a short-lived punk band. At 14 she recorded a demo tape of her own songs at Trinity Studios, Woking; however, despite music industry interest, she chose to continue with her studies.

Herbert went to Glebelands School in Cranleigh, Surrey and, for her sixth form studies, to Alton College in Hampshire, where her musical tastes moved more towards jazz. While she was studying at St Chad's College, University of Durham, she met up with fellow student Will Rutter and together they began to write and perform in the cafés and bars of North East England as a jazz duo called Black Coffee.

== Professional career ==
=== First Songs ===
After leaving university, Herbert and Rutter moved to London, where they soon met a former member of Boney M who had been asked to judge a forthcoming Polish television music competition. As Black Coffee, they were invited to enter, and won the competition. Returning to London, Black Coffee continued to perform in local bars, before being introduced to Ian Shaw, a noted jazz vocalist. This led eventually to the production of a debut CD, First Songs, initially credited to "Gwyn and Will", of both original songs and jazz standards, which was launched at London's PizzaExpress Jazz Club in September 2003. The Herbert/Rutter song "Sweet Insomnia" featured guest vocals from Jamie Cullum. Described by BBC Music's reviewer as "a lovingly crafted debut", the album received a significant amount of radio airplay on Jazz FM and BBC Radio 2, and was promoted by Michael Parkinson.

=== Bittersweet and Blue ===
Soon after, Herbert was signed to the Universal Classics and Jazz label and released, in September 2004, her first major label album, Bittersweet and Blue. This comprised mainly jazz standards, but also included three original tracks by Herbert and Rutter. Herbert's version of Neil Young's "Only Love Can Break Your Heart", taken from this album, was featured on the soundtrack of romantic comedy Leap Year, directed by Anand Tucker and starring Amy Adams and Matthew Goode. John Fordham, in a four-starred review of the album for The Guardian, praised Herbert's "precociously powerful chemistry of taste and meticulous care for every sound – from a whisper to an exhortation".

=== Between Me and the Wardrobe ===
Herbert left Universal Classics and Jazz to pursue a less commercial and more personal musical direction and then self-financed a project in which she collaborated with Polar Bear's Seb Rochford in a production role. Between Me and the Wardrobe, an album of self-penned songs, was recorded in three days and was never intended for general release. The album was initially made available, in 2006, on Herbert's own Monkeywood label before being picked up by Blue Note Records, making Herbert their first UK signing in 30 years. In a five-starred review, Stuart Nicholson of The Observer said that on this album she "lets the lyrics do the work for her. They are well thought out, moving between artfully constructed soft-focus simplicities to poignant yearning".

=== Ten Lives and All the Ghosts ===
In early 2008, Herbert was commissioned by a collaborative project between Peter Gabriel and Bowers & Wilkins to record an acoustic album at Gabriel's Real World Studios. The result of these sessions, Ten Lives, was released as a digital download in July 2008, available only from the Bowers & Wilkins website as part of their Music Club.

Remixed versions of these songs were to form the basis of Herbert's album All the Ghosts: it was released by Naim Edge in July 2009 in Europe to critical acclaim, including four-starred reviews from The Daily Telegraph and The Guardian; the album was released in the United States in June 2010. This album also featured two further recordings, including a cover version of David Bowie's "Rock 'n' Roll Suicide", by Robert Harder, who had previously collaborated with Herbert as recording engineer of Between Me and the Wardrobe. It was remastered for vinyl by Steve Rooke at Abbey Road Studios, London and reissued in LP format in 2010.

=== Clangers and Mash ===
In October 2009, Herbert returned to Harder Sound Studio to record the song "Perfect Fit" which she gave away as a free download, available exclusively from Naim Edge. It was also released as a single on 7 March 2011. The track was also one of nine tracks on her EP Clangers and Mash, released on 1 November 2010, which included remixes, by Seb Rochford of Polar Bear, of some of her previously published songs.

In a four-starred review for The Guardian, John Fordham described it as a "fascinating set of variations on the familiar for Herbert regulars, or an appealing introduction for jazz-averse newcomers", saying that although her songs had been radically transformed, "Herbert's unfussy soulfulness and personal vision always glow through".

=== The Sea Cabinet ===
In January 2010, Herbert was commissioned by Snape Maltings as artist-in-residence to write, record and perform a new body of work based on stories of the sea. This was performed in October 2010 at Snape Maltings. An album of this music, The Sea Cabinet, was released in May 2013 and launched in a series of concerts from 23 to 26 May at Wilton's Music Hall in London's East End. In a review of the album launch, The Guardian's jazz critic John Fordham said that "Herbert's imaginative narrative, and her casually commanding voice – whether softly nuanced as confiding speech or at full soaring-contralto stretch – were the central characters in an entertaining and often moving show that opens a new chapter in her creative story". Michal Boncza, in a review for the Morning Star of musical performances in 2013, described it as a "stand-out", admiring "a voice that can effortlessly render any emotion with commanding ease. Every song is an impressively crafted and engrossing vignette of life's more difficult moments and they grab the attention time and again".

The Financial Times' four-starred review called it "a concept album about the debt British history owes to the sea". In a four-starred review The Independent described it as a "cabinet of curiosities" with "a cabaret approach to storytelling, in rollicking sea shanties and waltzes", and "inventive" instrumentation "featuring wheezing accordions, warbling woodwind, tinkling music boxes and rolling bells". Alexander Varty, for Vancouver's The Georgia Straight, said that the album "blends Weimar cabaret and English music-hall stylings, with disquieting touches of avant-garde jazz".

Commenting on her live performance in July 2013 at the Love Supreme Jazz Festival in Glynde Place, East Sussex, Nick Hasted of The Independent said: "Gwyneth Herbert sings the shanties on her The Sea Cabinet album with happy, cabaret sensuality, detailing a relationship’s shipwrecked, sunken past in 'I Still Hear The Bells'".

In a performance described as "mesmerising" and "a surreal delight", with "beautiful entrancing music", Theatre Elision gave the song cycle its United States premiere from 30 May to 9 June 2019 at The Southern Theater in Minneapolis, Minnesota. The production, with a running time of 75 minutes, was directed by Lindsay Fitzgerald.

=== Letters I Haven't Written ===
Letters I Haven't Written, her seventh album, was released on 12 October 2018. It was produced at Rockfield Studios, Monmouth and, like Herbert's previous album The Sea Cabinet, was crowdfunded. The songs on the album, all written by Herbert, have been described as "exquisitely crafted". On the subjects of "love, gratitude and protest", they are about the lost art of letter writing. Reviewing the album for Jazzwise magazine, Peter Quinn said that "Letters I Haven't Written is by turns moving, thrilling and entrancing".

=== The A–Z of Mrs P ===
In 2010, Herbert won the Stiles and Drewe Song of the Year Award with her composition "Lovely London Town", from a musical she wrote with playwright Diane Samuels. The musical, The A–Z of Mrs P, tells the story of Phyllis Pearsall's creation of the London A–Z Street Atlas. It was performed in workshop with actress Sophie Thompson in May 2011 and opened at Southwark Playhouse on 21 February 2014 starring Peep Show actress Isy Suttie. The show's original cast recording, which includes a bonus track sung by Herbert, was released in March 2014.

=== Springtime for Henry (and Barbara) ===
At Site Gallery, the contemporary art space in Sheffield, Gwyneth Herbert and the artist Mel Brimfield explored an imagined relationship between the sculptors Henry Moore and Barbara Hepworth in Barbara and Henry – The Musical, which ran from 18 November to 13 December 2014. This developed into the spoof musical Springtime for Henry (and Barbara), which was performed at Wilton's Music Hall in London's East End on 26 and 27 January 2016. It starred Frances Ruffelle as Hepworth and Andrew C. Wadsworth as Moore.

=== The Snow Queen, A Christmas Carol and The Nutcracker ===
In December 2016 and January 2017 she performed in, and was composer, lyricist and musical director for, a musical production at Bristol Old Vic of Hans Christian Andersen's story The Snow Queen, directed by Lee Lyford. The Guardian's reviewer, Lyn Gardner, praised "Gwyneth Herbert’s delightful songs and their deadpan wit".

She returned to Bristol Old Vic in December 2018 as a performer, composer, lyricist and musical director for a musical production of the Charles Dickens story A Christmas Carol, also directed by Lee Lyford, which received a five-starred rating from the Bristol Post. Reviewing the show for WhatsOnStage.com, Daisy Bowie-Sell said: "Gwyneth Herbert's music is a lovely, a-tonal mix of minor chords that are a little reminiscent of those heard in the Old Vic's recent The Grinning Man. And though the songs are not exactly ear worms, they are absolutely beautiful, including a love song sung by Crystal Condie as Scrooge's one-time love interest and Harry Bird as her partner." The Guardian described Herbert's music for the show as "haunting". The production continued its run until 13 January 2019 and returned on 28 November 2019, running until 12 January 2020.

She was composer/lyricist for Bristol Old Vic's 2022 Christmas show The Nutcracker. She also had a part in this production in what The Observer's reviewer described as the "terrifying, curse-hurling Queen Mouse, played by Herbert with wicked glee".

=== Other musicals and compositions ===
In April 2012, Gwyneth Herbert's one-act musical Before the Law, co-written with Christine Denniston and adapted from Peter Barnes' A Hand Witch of the Second Stage, received a Special Commendation at the inaugural Sidney Brown Memorial Award (now called the S & S Award) for the best new unproduced musical of the year, which is run by Mercury Musical Developments (MMD), the organisation that supports new musical theatre writing. It is the companion piece to After Lydia, a 30-minute one-act musical based on Terence Rattigan’s play of the same name, which was commissioned by Sounds of England and was also a collaboration with Christine Denniston. After Lydia was given a 45-minute reading at Ronnie Scott's Jazz Club in London on 14 March 2011, starring Rebecca Caine, Andrew C. Wadsworth, Simon Green and Daniel Fraser, with Stefan Bednarczyk as musical director. Directed by Maria Friedman, it also had a staged reading at the Watermill Theatre, Newbury, Berkshire in August 2012.

Herbert was the composer and sound designer for a play by Diane Samuels, Poppy + George, which was performed at Watford Palace Theatre in February 2016. Herbert has also collaborated with Diane Samuels in writing a new musical about contraception, The Rhythm Method, which was performed at the Landor Space in Clapham, London in May 2018.

Herbert composed music for Le Tabou, a full two-act musical theatre piece based on the surrealist novel Froth on the Daydream and the life of its author Boris Vian, written by Kath Burlinson and performed by Youth Music Theatre UK at the Barbican Theatre, Plymouth in August 2013.

Her songs have been covered by other artists. "Not the Kind of Girl", a song that Herbert wrote for a screening of the 1928 film The Patsy at the Birds Eye View film festival at the BFI, was included by Ian Shaw on his 2017 album Shine Sister Shine.

In 2017, Herbert wrote the song "Boxed Up Broken Heart" for actress Jasmine Armfield to perform in the BBC television programme EastEnders, in her role as Bex Fowler. She also co-wrote, with Olivia Stevens, the song "Leave A Little Light On", which was released as a single by Ruby and the Revelators in January 2019.

=== Other work ===
In 2016 she was one of the judges for the BBC Young Musician Jazz Awards.

==== Performances ====
In March 2010, Herbert performed a newly commissioned score for Marion Davies’ 1928 silent comedy classic The Patsy, at BFI Southbank's Birds Eye View Film Festival. One of the songs, "Not the Kind of Girl", subsequently appeared as the final track on her 2018 album Letters I Haven't Written.

In 2012, Herbert joined forces with members of the Buck Clayton Legacy Band to explore, in a series of concerts and talks, the jazz repertoire of Peggy Lee. In July 2012, she performed, with BBC Radio 3 DJ Max Reinhardt and Paris-based singer China Moses, in a revue by Alex Webb which told the story of Café Society, New York's first non-segregated nightclub. The show had a London Jazz Festival premiere at the Southbank Centre and a successful run at Kilburn's Tricycle Theatre.

In 2014, she collaborated with artist Mel Brimfield in presenting The Palace That Joan Built, a celebration of the centenary of Joan Littlewood's birth, as part of the London Underground's Art on the Underground programme. This included a live performance at Stratford Underground station.

In 2015, as part of the London Sinfonietta’s Notes to the New Government concert, which expressed composers' hopes for the future of society following Britain's general election, she performed a new song, "Tick Tock", described by The Guardian as "gloriously done, inveigh[ing] against educational conformity". In January 2016 she and Frances Ruffelle performed a cabaret piece when Charles, Prince of Wales and Camilla, Duchess of Cornwall visited Wilton's Music Hall.

In autumn 2017 she and her band previewed a new touring show and forthcoming album, Letters I Haven't Written.

==== Broadcasts ====
Gwyneth Herbert talked to Claire Martin about her album Bittersweet and Blue on BBC Radio 3's Jazz Line-Up on 12 February 2005 and was interviewed about her career on BBC Radio 4's Woman's Hour on 28 November 2007. On 13 December 2013, with Frances Ruffelle, Isy Suttie and Neil Marcus, she talked with Tom Service on his BBC Radio 3 programme Music Matters about the development of musical theatre and The A–Z of Mrs P.

On 1 February 2008, in a broadcast for BBC Radio 3's Jazz Library, she joined the programme's presenter Alyn Shipton to discuss the recordings of Ella Fitzgerald. On 23 March 2008 she joined Alyn Shipton to select the best albums from singer Anita O'Day's discography. On 23 October 2011, in another broadcast for Jazz Library, subsequently made available as a podcast, she joined Shipton to identify the best work of the saxophonist and singer Louis Jordan. On 22 March 2014 she picked, with Shipton, the essential recordings of Dinah Washington.

In 2010, 2011 and 2013 she and Thomas Guthrie sang in The Playlist, a series of BBC Radio 4 broadcasts recreating the previously unknown musical lives of famous figures from the past, discovering and recording their favourite songs – including songs they themselves had composed.

==== Recordings ====
Gwyneth Herbert has appeared on other artists' albums. She is featured on the track "A Day In The Life Of A Fool" on Konishi Yasuharu's 2011 album One and Ten Very Sad Songs – Konishi Yasuharu Is Pizzicato One (Universal Music). She provided "vocal theremin" on the track "C.H.A.O.S. (The Third version)" on Bourgeois & Maurice's 2013 album The Third. She also produced this track and three others on the album, co-producing a fifth track with Ben Humphreys. She was a vocalist on Dave Price's original soundtrack digital album for The Roof, which was performed by London's Fuel Theatre during 2014.

On Janette Mason's 2014 album D'Ranged she took lead vocals on two tracks – the Alison Moyet song "This House" and Paul Weller's "You Do Something To Me". London Jazz News described the treatment of Paul Weller's song, with Herbert accompanied only by Mason's piano, as "a haunting and affecting performance". She performed songs on the 2004 album The Music of BB Cooper: Featuring the Best in British Vocal Jazz and the 2022 album Heart of Mine: Songs of Ross Lorraine.

== Production ==
Herbert is also a record producer. She produced Frances Ruffelle's album, I Say Yeh-Yeh, released on 9 October 2015 and provided musical arrangements for Ruffelle's shows in New York City in 2017 and 2019, which she co-created, Frances Ruffelle Live(S) in New York!

== Performance ==
Gwyneth Herbert has been described as a "sophisticated jazz-ballad artist" with a "precociously powerful chemistry of taste and meticulous care for every sound – from a whisper to an exhortation" and "a voice that can effortlessly render any emotion with commanding ease".

== Discography ==
=== Gwyneth Herbert and Will Rutter ===
Album	Release date	Label	Notes
First Songs	27 October 2003	Dean Street Records (CD: DNSTCD2002); Universal Music Classics & Jazz (CD/LP: 9866620)	Initially credited to "Gwyn and Will"

=== Gwyneth Herbert ===
Album	Release date	Label	Notes
Bittersweet and Blue	27 September 2004	Universal Records (CD: 9867896)	Several of the tracks subsequently appeared on compilation albums.
Between Me and the Wardrobe	2006	Monkeywood Records (MONKEYWOOD01)	
Between Me and the Wardrobe (reissue)	20 August 2007	Blue Note Records/ EMI Latin (CD: 5032582)	
Ten Lives (digital download)	18 July 2008	Real World Records/ Bowers & Wilkins Music Club	Remixed versions of the songs on this album, all written by Herbert, formed the basis of her next album, All the Ghosts.
All the Ghosts	13 July 2009 (CD); 2010 (LP)	Naim Edge (CD: NAIMCD135); (LP: NAIMLP145)	The track "Somedays I Forget" was included on Best Of British And Beyond, a various artists' compilation. This was issued as a covermount CD with Jazzwise magazine's 162nd issue in April 2012 and was also released by Naim Jazz (CD: NAJW02).
The Sea Cabinet	20 May 2013	Monkeywood Records (MONKEYWOOD02)	
Letters I Haven't Written	5 October 2018	Monkeywood Records (MONKEYWOOD03)	

EP	Release date	Label	Notes
Clangers and Mash	1 November 2010	Naim Edge (CD: NAIMCD137)	Includes the song "Perfect Fit"

Single	Release date	Label	Notes
"Perfect Fit"	7 March 2011	Naim Edge	The song also appears on her 2010 album Clangers and Mash.
"You're Welcome"	1 October 2018	Monkeywood Records	The song also appears on her 2018 album Letters I Haven't Written.

=== Various artists ===
Album	Release date	Label	Notes
The Music of BB Cooper: Featuring the Best in British Vocal Jazz	2004	Artfield (ART001)	Produced and arranged by Ian Shaw, the album features music by BB Cooper with songs performed by various artists. Gwyneth Herbert performs "Love Has Got A Sting In Its Tail" (BB Cooper/Stephen Clark) and "Pour Maintenant" (word and music by BB Cooper).
Heart of Mine: Songs of Ross Lorraine	2022	Ross Lorraine Records (RLR001)	Co-produced by Claire Martin, Ross Lorraine and Chris Travers, the album features songs by composer and pianist Ross Lorraine. Gwyneth Herbert takes lead vocals on two songs, "Play On" and "They're Playing our Song", and provides backing vocals on the other tracks.

=== The A–Z of Mrs P Original London Cast ===
Album	Release date	Label	Notes
The A–Z of Mrs P	24 March 2014	SimG Productions (CD: SimGR-CD022)	All the songs on the album were written by Gwyneth Herbert and 18 of them are performed by members of the original London cast. On a 19th, bonus track, Gwyneth Herbert performs "Nothing Much to Say".

=== Janette Mason ===
Album	Release date	Label	Notes
D'Ranged	4 August 2014	Fireball Records (FMJP 10004)	Gwyneth Herbert sings on two tracks: "This House" (Alison Moyet) and "You Do Something To Me" (Paul Weller).

== Personal life ==
Gwyneth Herbert lives in Weston-super-Mare, Somerset.
