= The A–Z of Mrs P =

- Southwark Playhouse poster by Su Blackwell
- Music: Gwyneth Herbert
- Lyrics: Gwyneth Herbert
- Book: Diane Samuels
- Productions: 2014 Southwark Playhouse
- Awards: 2010 Stiles and Drewe Song of the Year Award for the song "Lovely London Town"

The A–Z of Mrs P is a musical conceived by Neil Marcus and written by British playwright Diane Samuels and British composer Gwyneth Herbert. Described as "a musical fable inspired by the autobiographies of Phyllis Pearsall", it tells the story of Phyllis Pearsall's creation of the London A to Z street atlas. The A–Z of Mrs P was performed in workshop with actress Sophie Thompson in May 2011. It opened in London at Southwark Playhouse on 21 February 2014, starring Peep Show actress Isy Suttie and Frances Ruffelle.

The Southwark Playhouse production received a four-starred review in The Times. Herbert won the Stiles and Drewe Song of the Year Award with her composition "Lovely London Town", one of the songs in the show.

A CD of the original London cast recording of the show was released on 24 March 2014 by SimG Productions.

== Theatrical production ==
The A–Z of Mrs P was first performed at London's Southwark Playhouse from 21 February to 29 March 2014. It was presented by Neil Marcus with Paul Tyrer and Jamie Clark for The Booking Office and Michael Peavoy Productions and was directed by Sam Buntrock. The set design was by Klara Zieglerova, the lighting design was by David Howe, the sound design was by Andrew Johnson and the costume design was by Philippa Batt. Steve Ridley was musical director and the musical staging was by Nick Winston. The orchestrations were by Sarah Travis and Gwyneth Herbert.

== Characters and original cast ==
- Phyllis Pearsall – Isy Suttie
- Bella Gross (Phyllis's mother) – Frances Ruffelle
- Sandor Gross (Phyllis's father) – Michael Matus
- Tony Gross (Phyllis's brother) – Stuart Matthew Price
- Other parts played by members of the Mrs P Company – Ian Caddick, Sarah Earnshaw, Max Gallagher, Sidney Livingstone, Dawn Sievewright
- Musicians – Steve Ridley (keyboard/musical director), Rory Dempsey (bass), Emma Fowler (reed instruments), Davide Pasqualini (percussion), Max Gallagher (accordion)

== Reception ==
In a four-starred review, Donald Hutera of The Times described it as an "engaging new musical" and "a small-scale entertainment of some charm", with a score that is "accomplished... melodious, articulate and fun". Mark Shenton, writing in The Stage, said "There’s a real heart to the production, particularly in its tender portrait of Pearsall, whom Isy Suttie invests with a stunning blend of the gauche and sincere, the knowing and the vulnerable." He added that although "Diane Samuels' book too often goes off on tangents, Herbert's score is moody and lyrically astute enough to keep the dramatic momentum on track."

The A–Z of Mrs P

Studio album by Original London Cast Recording
- Released: 24 March 2014
- Genre: Musical
- Length: 38:39
- Label: SimG Productions
- Producer: Simon Greiff

== Original London Cast recording ==
The Original London Cast recording of The A–Z of Mrs P, which was produced by Simon Greiff and engineered by Kevin Poree and Danny Monk, was recorded at Southwark Playhouse on 27 and 28 February 2014. The music was produced, mixed and mastered by Kevin Poree at Berry Street Studio in Clerkenwell, London, in March 2014 and the CD was issued on 24 March 2014 by SimG Records. It consists of 18 tracks, all written by Gwyneth Herbert and performed by members of the original London cast. On a 19th, bonus track, Gwyneth Herbert performs an additional self-penned song "Nothing Much to Say".

== Track listing ==
- "Best Foot Forward" – Isy Suttie & Company
- "It Depends How You Look At It" / "Painting Song" – Isy Suttie & Company
- "Bus Song" – Isy Suttie, Ian Caddick & Company
- "Alexander Gross" – Michael Matus & Company
- "Lovely London Town" – Isy Suttie & Company
- "A Girl Needs A Husband" – Isy Suttie
- "Something Kind Of" – Michael Matus & Frances Ruffelle
- "Indexing Lovely London Town" – Isy Suttie & Company
- "Magic and Mystery" / "Profit and Property" – Frances Ruffelle, Isy Suttie, Michael Matus & Stuart Matthew Price
- "Draughtsman’s Song" – Sidney Livingstone
- "This Is Your Time" – Sidney Livingstone, Isy Suttie & Company
- "I Am a Representative" – Isy Suttie & Company
- "Galloping Galloping" – Frances Ruffelle
- "The Softness Of Women" – Michael Matus
- "Galloping Galloping" / "The Softness Of Women" (reprise) – Frances Ruffelle & Michael Matus
- "Can You Hear Me, Mama?" – Isy Suttie & Stuart Matthew Price
- "I’m Not A Callous Man" – Michael Matus
- "Ship Comes In" – Isy Suttie

Bonus track:

- "Nothing Much To Say" — performed by Gwyneth Herbert

== Design and artwork ==
The CD design and art direction was by Simon Beechey. The artwork for the theatre poster was by Su Blackwell.
