= Letters I Haven't Written =

Studio album by Gwyneth Herbert
- Released: 12 October 2018 (UK)
- Studios: Rockfield Studios, Monmouth
- Genre: Singer-songwriter
- Length: 52 minutes
- Label: Monkeywood (MONKEYWOOD-03)
- Producer: Gwyneth Herbert

Gwyneth Herbert chronology
| The Sea Cabinet (2013) | Letters I Haven't Written (2018) |

Singles from Letters I Haven't Written
- 1. "You're Welcome" Released: 28 September 2018

Letters I Haven't Written, the seventh album by British singer-songwriter Gwyneth Herbert, was released on 12 October 2018. It was produced at Rockfield Studios, Monmouth and, like Herbert's previous album The Sea Cabinet, was crowdfunded. The songs on the album, all written by Herbert, have been described as "exquisitely crafted". On the subjects of "love, gratitude and protest", they are about the lost art of letterwriting. Reviewing the album for Jazzwise magazine, Peter Quinn said that "Letters I Haven't Written is by turns moving, thrilling and entrancing".

Music from the album was previewed in a touring show which Herbert and her band performed at UK venues in 2017.

== Production ==
The album cover features artwork by Julia Andrews-Clifford and a photograph of Herbert by Ian Wallman.

== Track listing ==
| No | Title | Lyrics and music | Length | |
|---|---|---|---|---|
| 1 | "Fishing for Squirrels" | Gwyneth Herbert | 4:06 | |
| 2 | "More of Everything" | Gwyneth Herbert | 4:48 | |
| 3 | "Reading My Breath Away" | Gwyneth Herbert/ Krystle Warren | 5:22 | |
| 4 | "From Here to Over There" | Gwyneth Herbert | 3:48 | |
| 5 | "Frosting on Your Windows" | Gwyneth Herbert | 4:50 | |
| 6 | "You're Welcome" | Gwyneth Herbert | 5:26 | |
| 7 | "Until the Dust Settles" | Gwyneth Herbert | 5:52 | |
| 8 | "Tick Tock TICK" | Gwyneth Herbert | 4:47 | |
| 9 | "Don't Call Me That | Gwyneth Herbert | 3:43 | |
| 10 | "And You Are..." | Gwyneth Herbert | 5:52 | |
| 11 | "Not the Kind of Girl" | Gwyneth Herbert | 4:47 | Total length = 52 minutes |

== Songs ==
"Not the Kind of Girl", which previously Herbert had performed with her touring band, is a song about being obsessed with self-image. Herbert wrote it for a screening, in 2010, at BFI Southbank's Birds Eye View Film Festival in London, of the 1928 silent comedy classic film The Patsy, co-produced by and starring Marion Davies. British jazz singer Ian Shaw covered the song on his 2017 album Shine Sister Shine.

"You're Welcome" was inspired by the journey of the Windrush generation, the early migrants from the Caribbean who settled in the UK. It was released as a single in September 2018.

== Personnel ==
- Gwyneth Herbert – vocals, backing vocals, piano, ukulele, French horn, glockenspiel
- Sam Burgess – electric and acoustic bass, backing vocals
- Al Cherry – guitars, backing vocals
- Corrie Dick – percussion, drums, backing vocals
- Ned Cartwright – piano, keyboards, backing vocals
- Krystle Warren – vocals on "Fishing for Squirrels" and "From Here to Over There"
- Alice Zawadzki – strings
