= The Sea Cabinet =

Sea Cabinet
- Theatrical poster for US premiere
- Music: Gwyneth Herbert and Fiona Bevan
- Lyrics: Gwyneth Herbert and Fiona Bevan
- Book: Heidi James
- Productions: As concert performances: 2010: Snape Maltings concert hall, Snape, Suffolk (UK premiere); 2013: Wilton's Music Hall, Shadwell, London Borough of Tower Hamlets (London premiere); As musical theatre: 2019: Theatre Elision at The Southern Theater, Minneapolis, Minnesota (U.S. premiere)

The Sea Cabinet

Studio album by Gwyneth Herbert
- Released: 20 May 2013 (UK)
- Studio: Britten Studio, Aldeburgh Music, Suffolk
- Genre: jazz; singer-songwriter; song cycle
- Length: 51:13
- Label: Monkeywood (MONKEYWOOD02)
- Producer: Gwyneth Herbert and Dave Price

Gwyneth Herbert chronology
Clangers and Mash (2010)	The Sea Cabinet (2013)	Letters I Haven't Written (2018)

Professional ratings
Review scores
Source	Rating
All About Jazz	4.5/5 stars
Financial Times	4/5 stars
The Independent	4/5 stars
Buzz	4/5 stars
Jazzwise	4/5 stars

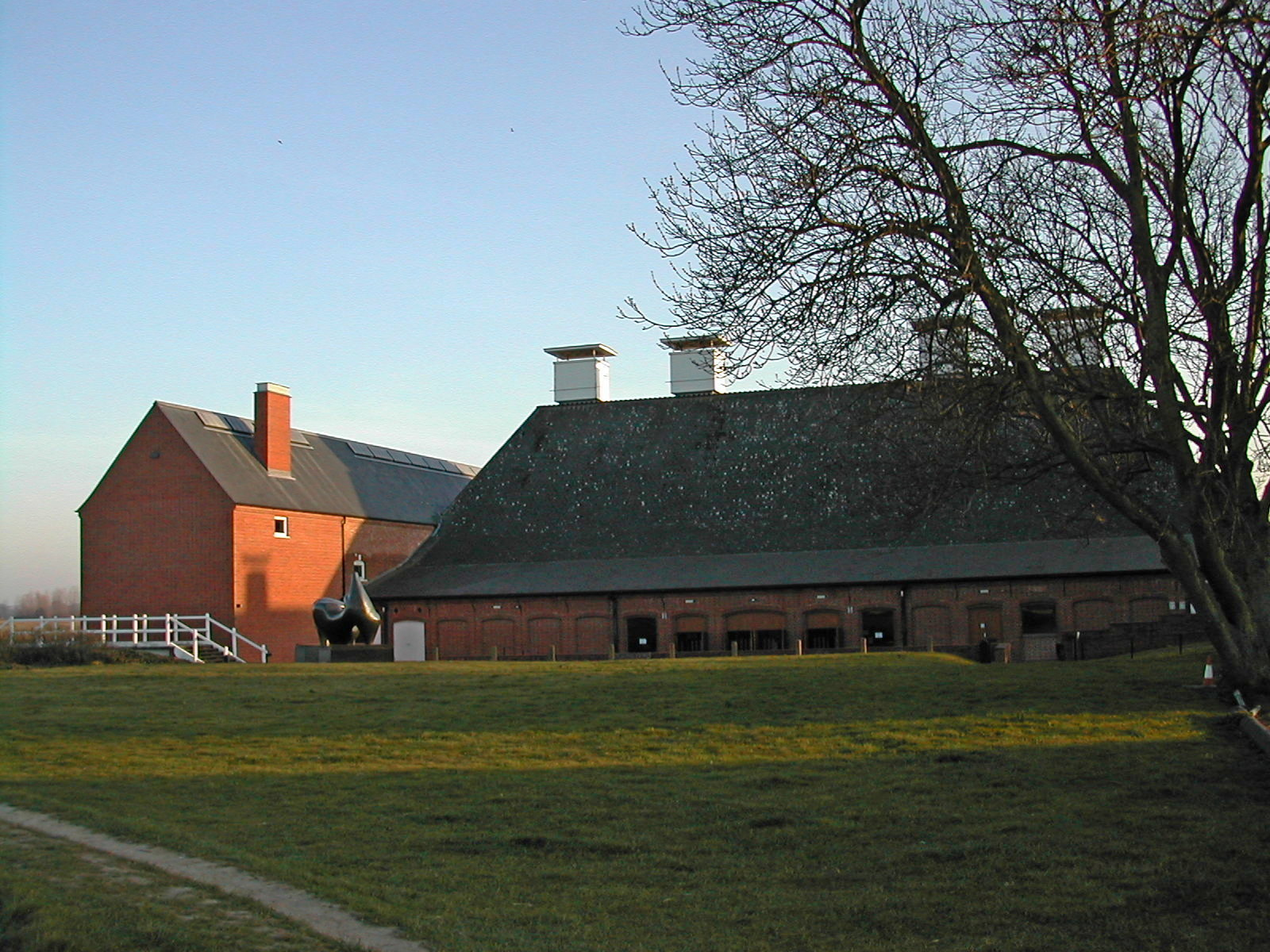
Snape Maltings concert hall, where the songs in The Sea Cabinet were first performed in October 2010

The Sea Cabinet is a song cycle and musical theatre piece by British singer-songwriter Gwyneth Herbert about "memory, obsession, love, and the sea". It is also the title of her sixth album, featuring a studio performance of the song cycle, which was released on 20 May 2013 and was critically acclaimed, receiving four-starred reviews in The Financial Times, The Independent and Jazzwise and a 4.5-starred review in All About Jazz. The music's sound has been described as a blend of "Weimar cabaret and English music-hall stylings, with disquieting touches of avant-garde jazz".

== Performance history ==
In January 2010, Gwyneth Herbert was commissioned by Snape Maltings in Suffolk as artist-in-residence to write, record and perform a new body of work based on stories of the sea. This was performed in October 2010 at Snape Maltings.

To coincide with the launch of her album of the music, Herbert and her band performed the song cycle at a series of concerts from 23 to 26 May 2013 at Wilton's Music Hall in London's East End. Reviewing the performance, The Guardian's jazz critic John Fordham said that "Herbert's imaginative narrative, and her casually commanding voice – whether softly nuanced as confiding speech or at full soaring-contralto stretch – were the central characters in an entertaining and often moving show that opens a new chapter in her creative story".

In a performance described as "mesmerising" and "a surreal delight", with "beautiful entrancing music", Theatre Elision gave the song cycle its United States premiere from 30 May to 9 June 2019 at The Southern Theater in Minneapolis, Minnesota. The production, with a running time of 75 minutes, was directed by Lindsay Fitzgerald. It was reprised by Theatre Elision, this time at the Elision Playhouse in Minneapolis, from 18 to 28 March 2021.

== Album production and release ==
An album of this music, The Sea Cabinet, was produced by Gwyneth Herbert and Dave Price. It was recorded and engineered by Robert Harder at Britten Studio at Aldeburgh Music, Suffolk, with additional recording and engineering by Robert Harder at Satellite Studios and by Dave Price at the Old Locker Room. The album was mixed by Robert Harder, Gwyneth Herbert and Dave Price and was mastered by Robert Harder. The album's cover artwork was by Sarah Jones, with photography by Rosie Reed Gold.

The album, financed through a crowd-funding initiative, was released on Herbert's own Monkeywood label in May 2013.

== Songs ==
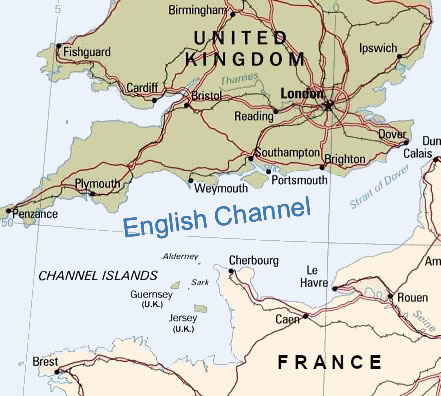
English Channel with Alderney in the middle

The album takes the form of a song cycle and a storyline which Herbert describes as follows: "Every day, a woman walks the beach alone, obsessively collecting every discarded and washed up object that she finds. She takes them home to catalogue each one with the care and rigour of a scientist. The artefacts are then placed in 'The Sea Cabinet', and every one sings with the memory of a secret sea-set story – the victory of a Fishguard (Note: Fishguard is a town in Pembrokeshire, south west Wales, which developed as a herring fishery and port.) cobbler's wife, a jaded seaside hotel, a sunken chapel, the shifting sands of wartime Alderney, the dangerous allure of the King's Shilling, (Note: To "take the King's shilling" was to agree to serve as a sailor or soldier in the Royal Navy or the British Army. "The King's Shilling". History Trails: Wars and Conflict. BBC. 28 January 2005. Archived from the original on 22 January 2013.) the loves and the losses and the stars and the whores and the drink and the drowning and the drip, drip, drip..."

A new version of Herbert's "Lorelei" is included on the album; this song also featured on her previous albums Ten Lives and All the Ghosts.

In her song "Alderney", Herbert tells the story of the sudden evacuation of the inhabitants of Alderney, one of the Channel Islands, in the Second World War. She sings about the irrevocable changes introduced during the Nazi occupation of the island and their effect on the islanders.

In a metaphor for an eroded love affair, "I Still Hear the Bells", co-written by Gwyneth Herbert and Fiona Bevan, refers to the "drowned" Suffolk village of Dunwich which was severely flooded in the 13th century. A popular local legend says that, at certain tides, church bells can still be heard from beneath the waves.

Instead of the usual two or three seconds of silence between tracks, Herbert inserts the sound of her walking across the stones at Aldeburgh.

== Reception ==
Alexander Varty, for Vancouver's The Georgia Straight, said that the album confirmed Herbert as being "a truly singular talent. Sonically, the record blends Weimar cabaret and English music-hall stylings, with disquieting touches of avant-garde jazz. Lyrically, it’s a suite of linked songs about memory, obsession, love, and the sea."

David Honigmann, in a four-starred review for the Financial Times, called it "a concept album about the debt British history owes to the sea". Holly Williams, in a four-starred review for The Independent, described it as a "cabinet of curiosities" with "a cabaret approach to storytelling, in rollicking sea shanties and waltzes", and "inventive" instrumentation "featuring wheezing accordions, warbling woodwind, tinkling music boxes and rolling bells". Andrew Clarke, writing in the East Anglian Daily Times, described the album's "collection of unusual percussive bells, bottles and ringing sounds" as "rather reminiscent of Benjamin Britten’s slung mugs in Noyes Fludde". (Note: Benjamin Britten's opera Noye's Fludde was first performed in 1958 at that year's Aldeburgh Festival. It is based on the 15th-century Chester "mystery" or "miracle" play which recounts the Old Testament story of Noah's Ark.)

John Eyles, in a 4.5-starred review for All About Jazz, praised its "consistency and unity of sound and tone" and the fact that several of the songs "could be taken for traditional folk songs rather than new compositions". Piers Ford, writing in The Art of the Torch Singer, described the album as "Haunted and haunting. Poignant and achingly beautiful. Ribald and raunchy. Evocative and nostalgic... In its lovingly-produced completeness, this album is a work of art". Writing in Metro, Robert Shore called it a "wildly inventive concept album" and praised Herbert's "beguiling wit that's as evident in her imaginative arrangements as it is in her lyrics". His Metro colleague Alex Macpherson described it as "an ambitious but grounded work" that showed Herbert "at the peak of her creative powers".

Lance Liddle, for the North East England jazz website bebop spoken here, said: "A full decade after her debut album First Songs, The Sea Cabinet finds Gwyneth at her most mature as a writer. The songs, inspired by the Suffolk coast, are timeless and immersive. And the album, knitted together by field recordings, is as unbroken as a shoreline."

== Track listing ==
No	Title	Lyrics and music	Length	
1	"Sea Theme"	Gwyneth Herbert	2:13	
2	"The Regal"	Gwyneth Herbert	3:19	
3	"Sweeter"	Gwyneth Herbert	3:49	
4	"Alderney"	Gwyneth Herbert	4:30	
5	"I Still Hear the Bells"	Gwyneth Herbert/Fiona Bevan	4:03	
6	"Fishguard Ladies"	Gwyneth Herbert	3:00	
7	"Plenty Time for Praying"	Gwyneth Herbert	2:02	
8	"Drink"	Gwyneth Herbert	1:55	
9	"The King's Shilling"	Gwyneth Herbert/Fiona Bevan	6:45	
10	"Promises"	Gwyneth Herbert/Heidi James	5:12	
11	"Lorelei"	Gwyneth Herbert	6:40	
12	"Drip"	Gwyneth Herbert	4:06	
13	"Sea Theme" (reprise)	Gwyneth Herbert	3:38	Total length = 51:13

== Personnel ==
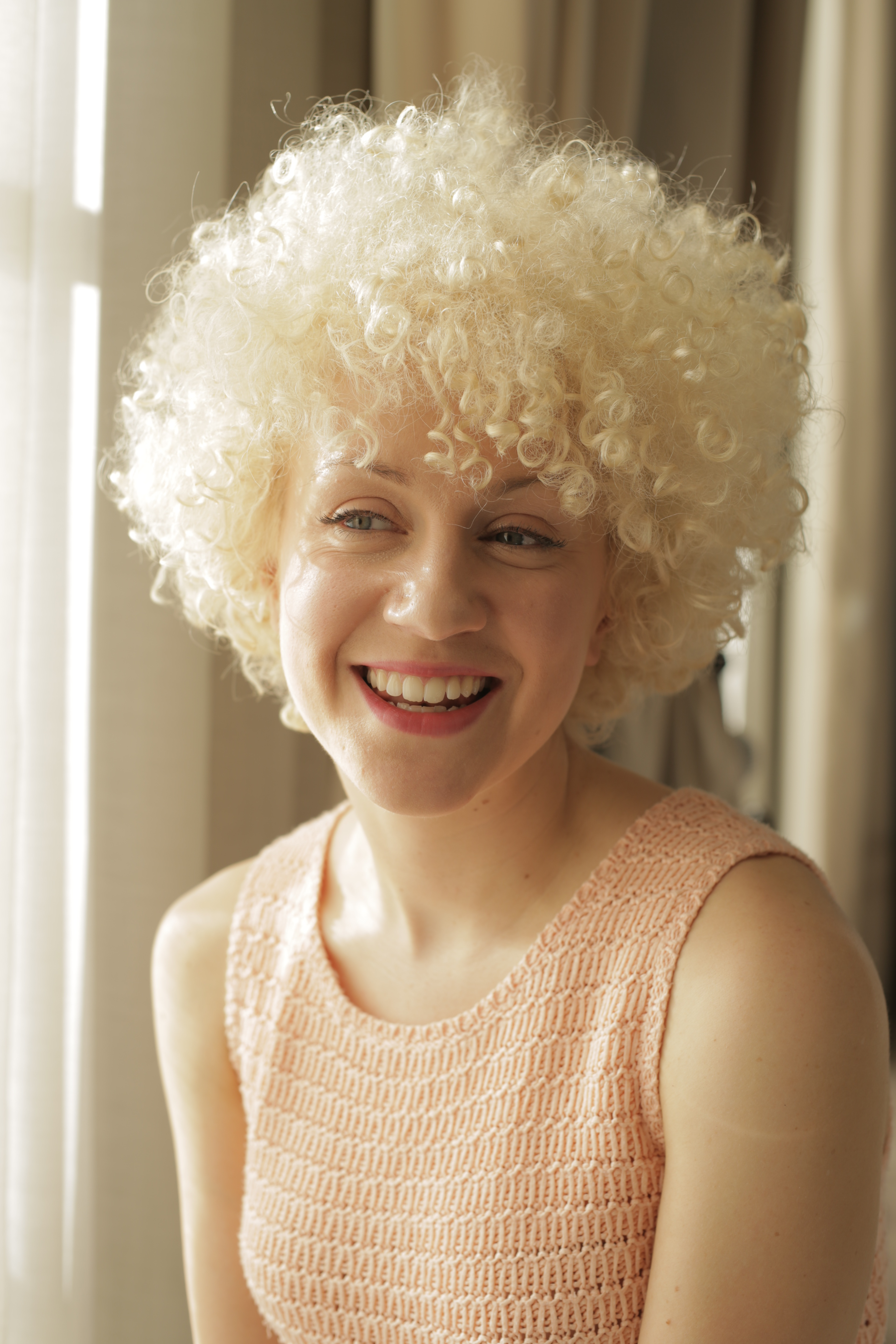
Fiona Bevan

On this album, Herbert shares vocals with singer-songwriter and guitarist Fiona Bevan, who also co-wrote two of the songs. She is backed by what was then her regular band – Dave Price, Al Cherry and Sam Burgess – and is joined Harry Bird and Christophe Capewell from The Rubber Wellies.

- Gwyneth Herbert – vocals, piano, ukulele
- Fiona Bevan – vocals, guitar, piano
- Dave Price – percussion, strings, piano, programming, backing vocals
- Al Cherry – guitar, backing vocals
- Sam Burgess – bass, backing vocals
- Harry Bird – guitar, clarinet, piano strings, backing vocals
- Christophe Capewell – fiddle, accordion, piano, melodica, backing vocals
- Tom Allan – trumpets
- Ollie Parfitt – Moog synthesiser
- Jack Carr, Alex Carr and Robert Harder – additional mob chorus
- Will McVay – chain
- Brian Herbert – gramophone operator

== See also ==
- Battle of Fishguard
- King's shilling
