= Not the Kind of Girl =

2010 song by Gwyneth Herbert

Song by Gwyneth Herbert

from the album Letters I Haven't Written
- Length: 4:47
- Label: Monkeywood
- Songwriter: Gwyneth Herbert

"Not the Kind of Girl"

Song by Ian Shaw

from the album Shine Sister Shine
- Released: 10 November 2017
- Length: 4:54
- Label: Jazz Village
- Songwriter: Gwyneth Herbert

"Not the Kind of Girl" is a song about being obsessed with self-image. It was written by British singer-songwriter Gwyneth Herbert for a screening, in 2010, at BFI Southbank's Birds Eye View Film Festival in London, of the 1928 silent comedy classic film The Patsy, co-produced by and starring Marion Davies. Herbert performed "Not the Kind of Girl" with her touring band and a studio recording of it was one of the tracks on her 2018 album Letters I Haven't Written.

== Cover versions ==
British jazz singer Ian Shaw covered the song on his album Shine Sister Shine (Jazz Village, 2017).
