= Perfect Fit (disambiguation) =

"Perfect Fit" is a 1995 song by Van Morrison.

Perfect Fit may also refer to:

- "Perfect Fit", a song by AFI from Very Proud of Ya, 1996
- "Perfect Fit", a song by Gwyneth Herbert from Clangers and Mash, 2009
- Perfect Fit, a 1990 NES game by Fisher-Price

== See also ==
- A Perfect Fit (disambiguation)
