= Travels with My Aunt (disambiguation) =

Travels with My Aunt may refer to:

- Travels with My Aunt, 1969 novel by Graham Greene
  - Travels with My Aunt (film), 1972 adaptation directed by George Cukor
  - Travels with My Aunt (play), 1991 adaptation by Giles Havergal
  - Travels with My Aunt (musical), 2016 musical adaptation by George Stiles and Anthony Drewe
