= Queer Tango =

Type of dance

Queer Tango (or Tango Queer) is dancing Argentine tango without regard to the traditional heteronormative roles of the dancers, and often to exchange the leader and follower roles. Therefore, it is related to open role or same-sex tango. The queer tango movement permits not only an access to tango for the LBGTQIAA+ community, but also supports female leaders and male followers, regardless of sexual orientation.

== Gender neutral dancing: open role reverse and same-sex tango ==
Queer Tango was not approved at first, due to the blurred lines of gender roles and social class rankings being affected. The Queer Tango movement breaks these rigid heteronormative gender roles of the tango world and permits all the permutations of partnering within tango. Same-sex tangoing is frequent: men dance with men, women dance with women, who can lead or follow. Also men dance with women, exploring open role reverse. The term queer, commonly used as a synonym for the LBGTQIAA+ community, is used here in a larger sense. A queer tango dancer shifts the focus from sexuality to gender which allows to enhance his expressiveness by way of role exchange. Therefore, the Queer Tango scene gives not only a home to gay, lesbian, bisexual, transgender, intersex tangueras and tangueros (tango dancers), where they can feel comfortable, it also creates a liberated tango environment for gender-neutral dancing, where rules and codes of traditional tango no longer restrain communication between people. By way of queer tango teaching, heterosexuals dancers can learn the open role reverse and enhance their competences in tango.

As with all types of social dance, including conventional tango, the skill level of Queer Tango varies. Dancers who engage in queer tango are interested in expression. "Bodies without organs" is a concept explored through same-sex tangoing, which allows people to experiment the dynamic presented in the technique. Living outside of the body and its organs can be a way for people to work more creatively and release ongoing stresses:

We suggest that redrawing, blurring and/or smudging the boundaries of the essential(ized) body, poking holes and coming to terms with the porosity of our skin, might help us to grapple with the partial and processual becoming of our bodies-in-relation.This detaches form from function, challenges prefigured/ predetermined conceptions and understandings of body parts (including sexual elements, organs, and limbs), and opens up possibilities for thinking otherwise (and perversely) about the roles and functional boundaries being created and policed. |— Chessa Adsit-Morris, "It Takes More Than Two to (Multispecies) Tango: Queering Gender Texts in Environmental Education".

== History ==
=== Background ===
There is one story which claims that tango as a dance was born in the brothels of Buenos Aires, another relates that tango was created by men dancing tango between men on street corners at the beginning of the 20th century:

"Because of a shortage of women in the immigrant population, there were really only two practical ways for a man to get close to a woman under these circumstances. One was to visit a prostitute and the other was to dance. The men practicing together, looking for the best ways to please a woman when they danced with her, preparing for that rare moment when they actually did have a woman in their arms, were the people who created the Tango as a dance."

— Christine Denniston, Clichés about Tango. Origins of the Dance

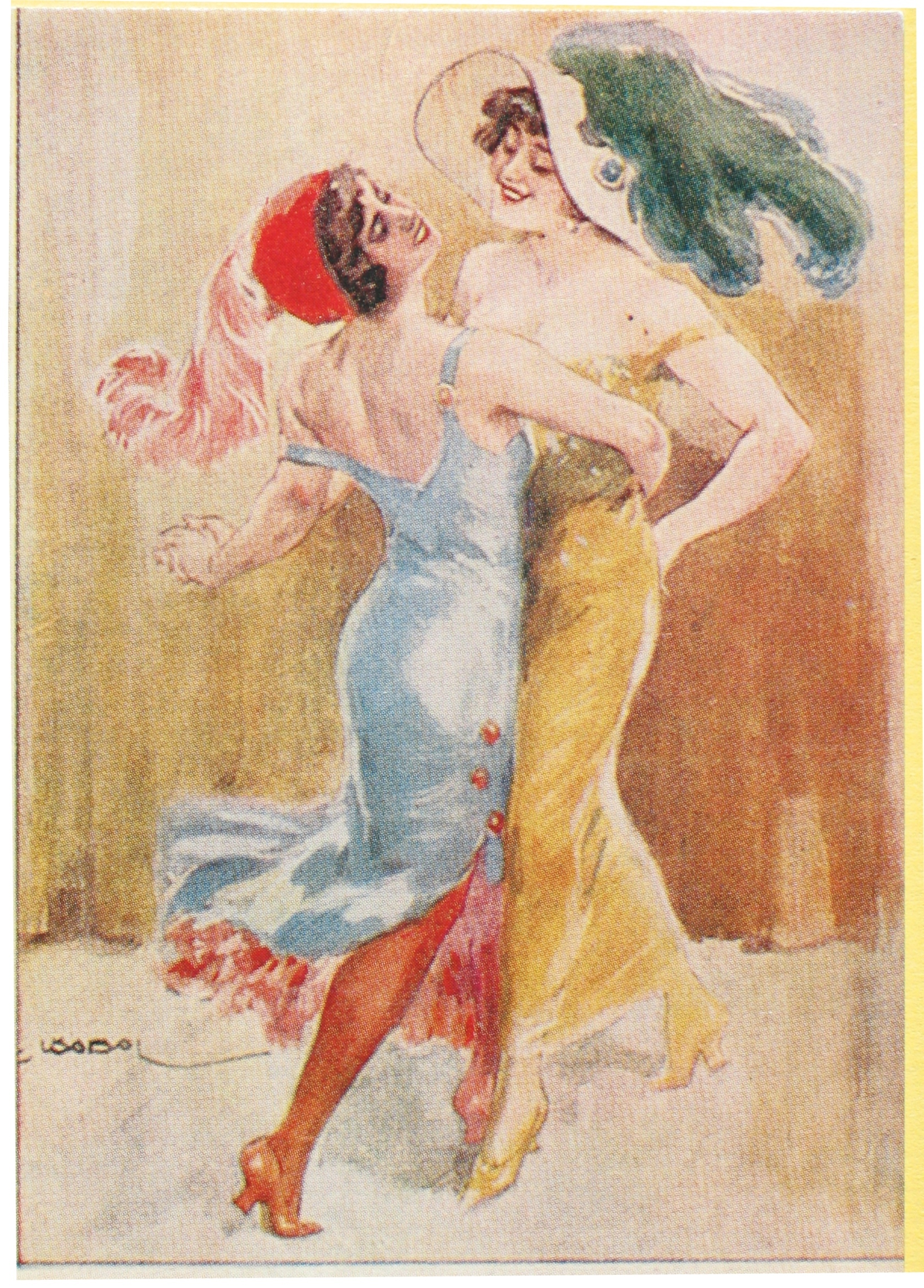
Soviet postcard from the 1920s

In the first decade of the 20th century, tango became famous as a couple dance (man-woman) in Paris. There are also French and American postcards from the first decades of the 20th century which represent tango between women. This feminine replica of man-to-man-tango generated much less literary documentation, yet a more extensive iconography tinged with a voyeuristic accent of eroticism:

"The origin of those images, like the origin of the enthronement of tango as a universal fashion, is Paris. They are mostly anonymous pictures of women before the retina of a man one imagines to be complacent with the image of two women narrowing the distance between their bodies, something this dance encourages. One cannot see in them any self affirmation of feminine propriety, but rather, flattery or seduction toward the male spectator.[…]On one hand, Saphic flirtation or outright lesbianism was exercised by valid individuals belonging to circles of artistic luster wherein this was entirely admissible. On the other hand, the cabarets, in their obvious role as vias for sexual escapism, found their place in society. The image of tango between women is to drink from both springs and, from both, some images representing it have been handed down to us."J. Alberto Mariñas, They dance alone…

This popularity of Tango in Europe, and especially in Paris, made it an interesting couple dance (man-woman) for the upper classes in Buenos Aires, and the Tango was re-imported from Europe for their benefit. The original way to dance it in same-sex couples got lost and was forbidden. Only male-female couples were allowed to dance in public milongas.

=== Movement ===
The queer tango movement which revives the origins of tango as a same-sex couple dance is relatively recent. It was founded in Hamburg, Germany where in 2001 the first gay-lesbian milonga was organized. In the same year the First International Queer Tango Argentina Festival was brought to life. Since 2001 it takes place every year in order to bring together same sex couples in tango from all over the world. Born in Germany, the Queer Tango movement inspired other countries to create local queer tango scenes. Meanwhile, Queer Tango festivals are celebrated for example in Argentina, Montevideo, in Denmark, Sweden, Paris, and in the United States.

In the bastion of traditional heteronormative tango, Augusto Balizano opened the first queer milonga, La Marshall, in Buenos Aires in 2002. A few years later, in 2005 Mariana Docampo started a weekly milonga in San Telmo called Tango Queer.

== Queer Tango in Buenos Aires ==
While queer tango is more and more common in the milongas in Buenos Aires, discrimination persists against same-sex couples or couples who reverse the traditional sex-assigned roles. In late March 2022, a new milonga housed in a famous tango institution posted a list of rules at its entrance. Among those rules was a strict prohibition on same-sex couples dancing together.

Members of the queer tango community continue to combat this type of discrimination. The Feminist Movement of Tango (Movimiento Feminista de Tango) maintains a social media presence to disseminate information, raise consciousness, and engage in activism.

Founded by Anahí Carballo in 2015, Tango Entre Mujeres (TEM) is the first Argentine-based all-women tango dance company. The first scene of its 2019 work Vinculadas includes reenacted quotes of the insults that the company has received for its groundbreaking work. Some of these include, "you [meaning women dancing with each other] are the death of tango!" and "pan con pan es comida de tontos."

== See also ==
- Gender studies
