= Peter Pan: A Musical Adventure =

Peter Pan
- A Musical Adventure
- Music: George Stiles
- Lyrics: Anthony Drewe
- Book: Willis Hall
- Basis: Peter Pan by J.M. Barrie
- Productions: 1999 Copenhagen; 2001 Royal Festival Hall concert 2002 Royal Festival Hall concert 2002 Philadelphia; 2007 Birmingham; 2008 Leeds; 2015 West End concert

Peter Pan: A Musical Adventure is a musical based on J. M. Barrie's 1904 play Peter Pan, or the Boy Who Wouldn't Grow Up, with a book by Willis Hall and music and lyrics by George Stiles and Anthony Drewe.

== Production history ==
The musical had its world premiere in Danish at the Det Ny Teater, Copenhagen in 1999.

In 2001, it was presented as a concert at the Royal Festival Hall, London by the BBC Symphony Orchestra, directed by Julia McKenzie and Jonathan Butterell starring Sheila Hancock as the Storyteller, John Thaw as Captain Hook, Jenna Russell as Mrs Darling, Laura Michelle Kelly as Wendy (with her real-life brothers Jorim and Nathan as Michael and John) and Joe McFadden as Peter Pan. The recording was broadcast on New Year's Eve on BBC Radio 3.

Following the success of the concert, a semi-staged version ran for 6 weeks at the Royal Festival Hall over 6 weeks for Christmas 2002, starring Richard Wilson as Captain Hook, James Gillan as Peter Pan, Susannah York as the Storyteller and Lotte Meyer as Wendy. The musical also made its US premiere at the Prince Music Theater in Philadelphia in winter 2002.

In November 2007, the musical received its full staged premiere over the Christmas season at the Birmingham Repertory Theatre, directed by Rachel Kavanaugh and starring Peter Caulfield as Pete Pan, Gina Beck as Wendy, and David Birrell as Captain Hook receiving positive reviews. The following Christmas season, the production transferred to the West Yorkshire Playhouse starring James Gillan as Peter Pan (reprising the role from the 2002 Royal Festival Hall production), Amy Lennox as Wendy and David Birrell as Captain Hook (reprising the role from the 2007 Birmingham Rep production), again receiving positive reviews. A cast recording featuring the Leeds cast was released in 2009.

On Sunday 25 October 2015 a one-off concert version of the show was performed at the Adelphi Theatre in London's West End starring Bradley Walsh as Captain Hook, Sheila Hancock as the Storyteller, Ray Quinn as Peter Pan and Jenna Russell as Mrs Darling.

In 2018, the show was staged at the Chicago Shakespeare Theater, directed by Amber Mak with revised book by Elliot Davis.

The musical has since been performed in many countries worldwide by both professional and amateur theatre companies.

== Musical numbers ==
Act I

- "There's Something in the Air Tonight" - Storyteller, Mr Darling, Londoners
- "Just Beyond the Stars" - Mrs. Darling
- "Tinker Bell and Peter Pan's Arrival" - Orchestra
- "Never Land" - Peter Pan, Wendy, John and Michael
- "The Lost Boys Gang" - The Lost Boys
- "Good Old Captain Hook" - Pirates
- "Build a House" - Peter Pan and The Lost Boys
- "The Cleverness of Me" - Peter Pan and Wendy
- "Crocodile/Tiger Lily/Siren Song" - Tiger Lily and Mermaids
- "When I Kill Peter Pan" - Captain Hook and Pirates

Act II

- "Look Back Through a Rose-Tinted Eye Patch" - Smee, Captain Hook and Pirates
- "Just Beyond the Stars (Reprise)" - Wendy
- "One Big Adventure" - Peter Pan and Wendy
- "The Cleverness of Me (Reprise)" - Peter Pan
- "When I Kill Peter Pan/Good Old Captain Hook (Reprise)" - Captain Hook and Pirates
- "One Big Adventure (Reprise)" - Peter Pan
- "A Pirate with a Conscience" - Captain Hook, Smee and Pirates
- "Never Land (Reprise)" - John, Michael, Wendy and The Lost Boys
- "The Fight" - Captain Hook, Peter Pan, Wendy, John, Michael, Pirates and Lost Boys
- "Just Beyond the Stars (Reprise 2)" - Storyteller and Mrs. Darling
- "There's Always Tomorrow" - Peter Pan and Londoners
