= All the Ghosts =

Studio album by Gwyneth Herbert
- Released: UK: 13 July 2009 (CD); 2010 (LP). US: 8 June 2010
- Genre: Jazz; Singer-songwriter
- Length: 37:00
- Label: Naim Edge
- Producer: Gwyneth Herbert and her band

Gwyneth Herbert chronology
Ten Lives (2008)	All the Ghosts (2009)	Clangers and Mash (EP) (2010)

Professional ratings
Review scores
Source	Rating
The Daily Telegraph	4/5 stars
The Guardian	4/5 stars
Metro	4/5 stars

All the Ghosts, the fifth album by British singer-songwriter Gwyneth Herbert, was released by Naim Edge in the United Kingdom in 2009 and in the United States in 2010. It was critically acclaimed, and received four-starred reviews from The Daily Telegraph, The Guardian and Metro.

== History ==
In early 2008, Herbert was commissioned by a collaborative project between Peter Gabriel and Bowers & Wilkins to record an acoustic album at Gabriel's Real World Studios. The result of these sessions – Ten Lives – was released as a digital download in July 2008, available only from the Bowers & Wilkins website as part of their Music Club.

== Production and release ==
Remixed versions of these songs were to form the basis of All The Ghosts, which was released by Naim Edge on 13 July 2009 in Europe and on 8 June 2010 in the United States. It was remastered for vinyl by Steve Rooke at Abbey Road Studios, London and reissued in LP format in 2010.

Herbert wrote all the songs, except for a hidden, bonus track – a cover version of David Bowie's "Rock 'n' Roll Suicide".

All but two of the tracks were recorded and engineered by Robin Baynton at Real World Studios, Box, Wiltshire. Robert Harder, who had previously collaborated with Herbert as recording engineer of Between Me and the Wardrobe, recorded and engineered "Annie's Yellow Bag" and "Rock 'n' Roll Suicide" and some additional warbling on "So Worn Out" at his sound studio in London.

The CD cover artwork was by Keemo.

== Reception ==
The album was critically acclaimed. Writing for BBC Music, John Eyles said: "Herbert's songs are rightly starting to draw comparisons with those of 60s Ray Davies and Paul McCartney. She has a fine sense of melody and her latest songs... create a cast of inner-city archetypes, each with an intriguing tale to tell. Many of the protagonists are society's losers or victims. Unlike Davies or McCartney, Herbert unfailingly sees the world from a woman's point of view. It is no coincidence that four of the track titles contain women's names".

In a four-starred review for The Guardian, John Fordham said: "This fine album... [is] the truest to her distinctive muse, with its debts to Janis Ian, Joni Mitchell and Tom Waits, as much as to Billie Holiday or Nina Simone....Herbert's earlier jazz following perhaps won't find many familiar landmarks... but as an idiosyncratic singer-songwriter album, All the Ghosts will be on the year-end hitlists whatever its genre".

In a four-starred review for The Daily Telegraph, Andrew Perry said that Herbert "whips up beautiful, vaguely jazzy, keenly observed vignettes, mostly about outsider women. There’s a great cover of David Bowie’s Rock ’n’ Roll Suicide, too".

In a four-starred review for Metro, Arwa Haider said: "The beguiling storytelling voice she demonstrated on her last album, 2006’s Between Me And The Wardrobe, beautifully enriches these nine tracks, along with creatively atmospheric band instrumentation".

== Track listing ==
No	Title	Lyrics and music	Length	
1	"So Worn Out"	Gwyneth Herbert	3:36	
2	"Annie's Yellow Bag"	Gwyneth Herbert	3:54	
3	"Lorelei"	Gwyneth Herbert	3:38	
4	"My Narrow Man"	Gwyneth Herbert	3:37	
5	"Jane into a Beauty Queen"	Gwyneth Herbert	3:03	
6	"Put Your Money Where Your Mouth is"	Gwyneth Herbert	4:42	
7	"Natalyia"	Gwyneth Herbert	2:58	
8	"My Mini and Me"	Gwyneth Herbert	4:34	
9	"Some Days I Forget"	Gwyneth Herbert	3:40	
10	"Rock 'n' Roll Suicide" (hidden bonus track)	David Bowie	3:42	Total length = 37:00

== Personnel ==
- Gwyneth Herbert – vocals, piano (on "My Narrow Man")
- Al Cherry – guitars
- Dave Price – percussion
- Sam Burgess – bass
- Steve Holness – piano and organ
- Jonathan Bierman – "droid" electronics on "So Worn Out"
