= Bittersweet and Blue =

Studio album by Gwyneth Herbert
- Released: 2004
- Studio: Townhouse Studios
- Genres: Jazz; singer-songwriter
- Label: Universal Classics and Jazz
- Producer: Pete Smith

Gwyneth Herbert chronology
First Songs (2003)	Bittersweet and Blue (2004)	Between Me and the Wardrobe (2006)

Professional ratings
Review scores
Source	Rating
The Guardian	4/5 stars

Bittersweet and Blue is the second album by British singer-songwriter Gwyneth Herbert. It was released in 2004 on the Universal Classics and Jazz label. It comprised mainly jazz standards. Herbert's version of Neil Young's "Only Love Can Break Your Heart", taken from the album, was featured on the soundtrack of romantic comedy Leap Year, directed by Anand Tucker and starring Amy Adams and Matthew Goode. The album received a four-starred review in The Guardian.

== Reception ==
Linda Serck, reviewing Bittersweet and Blue for musicOMH, described it as "a stunning album" from a "great jazz talent" who "embodies all the smoky jazz boozers she's ever sung in and tacitly commands you to prick up your ears and listen".

John Fordham, in a four-starred review for The Guardian, praised Herbert's "precociously powerful chemistry of taste and meticulous care for every sound – from a whisper to an exhortation."

== Track listing ==
No.	Title	Writer(s)	Length
1.	"Fever"	Eddie Cooley/John Davenport
2.	"(Looking for) The Heart of Saturday Night"	Tom Waits
3.	"The Very Thought of You"	Ray Noble
4.	"It's Alright with Me"	Cole Porter
5.	"Bittersweet and Blue"	Gwyneth Herbert/Will Rutter
6.	"Glory Box"	Geoff Barrow/Beth Gibbons/Adrian Utley/Isaac Hayes
7.	"Every Time We Say Goodbye"	Cole Porter
8.	"Almost Like Being in Love"	Alan Jay Lerner/Frederick Loewe
9.	"At Seventeen"	Janis Ian
10.	"Into Temptation"	Neil Finn (Crowded House)
11.	"A Little Less"	Gwyneth Herbert/Will Rutter
12.	"Fallen"	Gwyneth Herbert/Will Rutter
13.	"Only Love Can Break Your Heart"	Neil Young

== Personnel ==
- Gwyneth Herbert – vocals
- John Parricelli – acoustic, electric, nylon string and steel string guitars (except on "Bittersweet and Blue")
- Will Rutter – acoustic guitar on "Bittersweet and Blue"
- Tom Cawley – piano, vibes, Fender Rhodes and Hammond Organ
- Mark Hodgson – double bass
- Jeremy Stacey – drums (except on "Fever" and "Almost Like Being In Love")
- Ian Thomas – drums on "Fever" and "Almost Like Being In Love"
- Paul Clarvis – percussion
- Steve Sidwell – trumpet
- Neil Sidwell – trombone
- Nigel Hitchcock – tenor saxophone on "It's Alright With Me" and "A Little Less"
- Dave Bishop – tenor saxophone (except on "It's Alright With Me" and "A Little Less")

== Production ==
The album was produced and engineered by Pete Smith and was recorded and mixed at Townhouse Studios in west London between June and July 2004.

== Design ==
The album sleeve, incorporating photographs by Uri Weber, was designed by Rummey Design.

== Dedication ==
The album is dedicated to the memory of Tristan Hewins.
