= First Songs =

Studio album by Gwyneth Herbert and Will Rutter
- Released: 27 October 2003
- Studio: Cowshed Recording Studio, London
- Genre: Jazz
- Length: 53 minutes
- Label: Dean Street Records (CD: DNSTCD2002); Universal Music Classics & Jazz (CD/LP: 9866620)
- Producer: Ian Shaw

Gwyneth Herbert and Will Rutter chronology
First Songs (2003)	Bittersweet and Blue (2004)

First Songs, initially credited to "Gwyn and Will", is the debut album of British singer-songwriter Gwyneth Herbert and composer and acoustic guitarist Will Rutter. Comprising both original songs and standards, it was launched at London's Pizza Express Jazz Club in September 2003. The Herbert/Rutter song "Sweet Insomnia" featured guest vocals from Jamie Cullum.

== Reception ==
Described by BBC Music as a "lovingly crafted debut", the album received a significant amount of radio airplay on Jazz FM and BBC Radio 2, and was promoted by Michael Parkinson.

Writing in The Sunday Times, reviewer Clive Davis said: "If Gwyneth Herbert is not a star before long, I will eat my CD player. The sultry young singer’s partnership with guitarist Will Rutter has caused a stir on London's club circuit, and their debut album — artfully produced and arranged by vocalist Ian Shaw — lives up to that promise, blending pop and jazz values".

== Track listing ==
No	Title	Lyrics and music	Length	
1	"Little Red Rooster"	Willie Dixon	2:41	
2	"Maybe Me"	Gwyneth Herbert and Will Rutter	3:10	
3	"Beguiling Eyes"	Stephen Fearing	4:13	
4	"My Thief"	Burt Bacharach and Elvis Costello	4:06	
5	"I Was Doin' Alright"	George Gershwin and Ira Gershwin	2:59	
6	"It's Getting Better"	Barry Mann/Cynthia Weil	3:38	
7	"Sweet Insomnia"	Gwyneth Herbert and Will Rutter	3:39	
8	"Calling You"	Bob Telson	5:04	
9	"No Other Love"	Gwyneth Herbert and Will Rutter	3:38	
10	"Trains & Boats & Planes"	Burt Bacharach and Hal David	3:55	
11	"Don't Worry About Me"	Ted Koehler and Rube Bloom	3:58	
12	"There'll Be Some Changes Made"	Benton Overstreet and Billy Higgins	3:09	
13	"The Ballad of the Sad Young Men"	Frances Landesman	5:02	
14	"Beguiling Eyes" (FM Mix)	Stephen Fearing	4:24	Total length = 53 minutes

== Personnel ==
- Gwyneth Herbert – vocals
- Will Rutter – guitar
- Mark Hodgson – bass
- Tom Mason – bass
- Andy Nice – cello
- Josefina Cupido – drums and percussion
- Ben Godfrey – trumpet
- Guy Barker – trumpet
- Jamie Cullum – vocals
- Ian Shaw – keyboards and percussion

== Production ==
The album was produced by Ian Shaw, who arranged all the songs (except "No Other Love", which was arranged by Will Rutter). It was recorded by Joe Leach at the Cowshed Recording Studio, London between June and September 2003.
