= Clangers and Mash =

EP by Gwyneth Herbert
- Released: 1 November 2010
- Genre: Remix; jazz; Singer-songwriter
- Length: 33:00
- Label: Naim Edge (naimcd137)
- Producer: Seb Rochford

Gwyneth Herbert chronology
All the Ghosts (2009)	Clangers and Mash (2010)	The Sea Cabinet (2013)

Singles from Clangers And Mash
- 1. "Perfect Fit" Released: 7 March 2011

Professional ratings
Review scores
Source	Rating
The Guardian	4/5 stars
The Daily Telegraph	3/5 stars

Clangers and Mash is an EP by British singer-songwriter Gwyneth Herbert. It was released on 1 November 2010 and was critically acclaimed, receiving a four-starred review from The Guardian.

The EP includes remixes, by Seb Rochford of Polar Bear, of some of Gwyneth Herbert's previously published songs as well as the song "Perfect Fit" which had been issued as a free download in October 2009 and was released as a single on 7 March 2011.

== Reception ==
In a four-starred review for The Guardian, jazz critic John Fordham described it as a "fascinating set of variations on the familiar for Herbert regulars, or an appealing introduction for jazz-averse newcomers", saying that although her songs had been radically transformed, "Herbert's unfussy soulfulness and personal vision always glow through".

John Eyles, in a review for BBC Music, described the "fragility of Herbert's performance" on the closing track, an a cappella version of "Midnight Oil", as "beautiful".

Ivan Hewett, writing for The Daily Telegraph, said that the song "Perfect Fit" "has such a guilessly catchy melody you can't help being charmed by it."

== Track listing ==
No	Title	Lyrics and music	Length	
1	"Perfect Fit" (Radio Edit)		3:07	
2	"My Mini & Me" (Polar Bear Remix)		4:38	
3	"So Worn Out" (In the Bedroom)		2:53	
4	"Narrow Man" (Girl After Shower Remix)		3:49	
5	"Perfect Fit" (Mr. Solo & The Voluntary Butter Scheme Remix)		3:18	
6	"Petite Cacahuete"		3:29	
7	"So Worn Out" (Temper D Remix)		4:44	
8	"Perfect Fit" (Original Version)		3:15	
9	"Midnight Oil" (Acappella Version)		3:36	Total length = 32:51
