= Christine Denniston =

Christine Denniston (born 30 December 1963) is a playwright, author and dance teacher and one of Britain's leading exponents of the tango. She graduated in theoretical physics from the University of Cambridge.

In April 2012, her one-act musical Before the Law, co-written with Gwyneth Herbert, was awarded second place in the inaugural Sidney Brown Memorial Award for Most Promising New Work which is run by Mercury Musical Developments (MMD), the organisation which supports new musical theatre writing. Before the Law was adapted from A Hand Witch of the Second Stage by Peter Barnes. It is the companion piece to After Lydia, a one-act musical based on Terence Rattigan’s play of the same name, which was commissioned by Sounds of England and was also a collaboration with Gwyneth Herbert. After Lydia was given a 45-minute reading at Ronnie Scott's Jazz Club in London on Monday 14 March 2011, starring Rebecca Caine, Andrew C. Wadsworth, Simon Green and Daniel Fraser, with Stefan Bednarczyk as musical director. Directed by Maria Friedman, it also had a staged reading at the Watermill Theatre, Bagnor, Berkshire in August 2012.

== Musical theatre ==
- Before the Law by Herbert & Denniston, adapted from A Hand Witch of the Second Stage by Peter Barnes
  - Music and lyrics by Gwyneth Herbert • Book by Christine Denniston • Sidney Brown Memorial Award workshop and showcase at the Theatre Royal Drury Lane, directed by Matt Ryan, musical director Peter White
- After Lydia by Herbert & Denniston, adapted from a play by Terence Rattigan
  - Music and lyrics by Gwyneth Herbert • Book by Christine Denniston • Workshop and staged readings at The Watermill, Newbury, directed by Maria Freidman, musical director Stefan Bednarczyk • Selected for the New York Musical Theatre Festival
- Cake by Saward & Denniston
  - Music by Tim Saward • Lyrics and book by Christine Denniston • Selected for the LOST Theatre Five Minute Festival
- Beyond the Moon by Bruce & Denniston
  - Music and lyrics by Michael Bruce • Book by Christine Denniston • Workshop and staged reading at The Drill Hall, Bloomsbury, London, produced by Spekulation Entertainment

== Publications ==
- Denniston, Christine (2007). The Meaning of Tango: The Story of the Argentinian Dance, Anova Books. ISBN 1906032165, 9781906032166, 206 pp.
