= Identical (musical) =

2022 musical based on "Lisa and Lottie"

- Music: George Stiles
- Lyrics: Anthony Drewe
- Book: Stuart Paterson
- Basis: Lisa and Lottie by Erich Kästner
- Premiere: 26 July 2022: Nottingham Playhouse
- Productions: 2022 Nottingham and Salford

Identical is a stage musical with music by George Stiles, lyrics by Anthony Drewe and a book by Stuart Paterson. It is based on Erich Kästner's 1949 children's novel Lisa and Lottie (also known as The Parent Trap), which is also the basis for many adaptations including Disney's film franchise which began with a 1961 film.

== Plot ==
As with the novel, the musical follows the story of identical twin girls who were separated at birth and reunite at a summer camp ten years later before swapping places to reunite with their parents and live each other's lives.

== Production ==
=== Nottingham and Salford (2022) ===
The musical, directed by Trevor Nunn, designed by Rob Jones and choreographed by Matt Cole was due to have its world premiere at the Nottingham Playhouse before transferring to the Theatre Royal, Bath over the summer of 2020. However, due to the 2019–20 coronavirus pandemic in the United Kingdom, the production was delayed until 2022, playing at the Nottingham Playhouse from 26 July until 14 August before transferring to The Lowry, Salford from 19 August until 3 September.

== Cast and characters ==
=== Original cast ===
Character	Nottingham / Salford
Character	2022
Lisa	Kyla Fox Eden Patrick Savanna Robinson
Lottie	Nicole Fox Emme Patrick Sienna Robinson
Brigitta/Hansel	Winter Jarrett-Glasspool Kirsten Muzvuru
Gerda/Elsa/Gretel	Daisy Jeffcoate Poppy Pawson
Trude	Isabelle Larrey
Trude/Annie	Parrine Long
Steffi/Annie	Saffia Layla
Steffi	Helena Middleton
Lisalotte	Emily Tierney
Johan	James Darch
Miss Gerlach	Gabrielle Lewis-Dodson
Roza/Miss Methusius	Louise Gold
Dr. Strobl	Michael Smith-Stewart
Franz/Mr. Bernau	David Bardsley
Miss Ulrike/Mizzi	Ellie Nunn
Ensemble	Rico Bakker; Hannah Cauchi; Paige Fenlon; Rosie Glossop; Dominic Adam Griffin; Jordan Isaac; Rutendo Mushonga
