= Sylvia Young =

English theatre school principal (1939–2025)

Sylvia Young OBE
- Born: Sylvia Bakal; 18 September 1939; Hackney, London, England
- Died: 30 July 2025 (aged 85)
- Known for: Sylvia Young Theatre School
- Spouse: Norman Ruffell (m. 1961)
- Children: 2, including Frances Ruffelle
- Relatives: Eliza Doolittle (granddaughter)

Sylvia Ruffell OBE (née Bakal; 18 September 1939 – 30 July 2025), known professionally as Sylvia Young, was a British theatre school founder who was the founder and principal of Sylvia Young Theatre School in London, England.

== Sylvia Young Theatre School ==
Young founded her theatre school in 1981 in Drury Lane, London, before moving to its current Marylebone premises in 1983. The school is co-educational and provides a combination of academic and vocational classes for children aged 10 to 16 years. The academic curriculum encompasses GCSEs, while the vocational curriculum teaches acting, dance and music.

== Personal life and death ==
Young married Norman Ruffell in Hackney, London, in 1961 and had two children, actresses Frances Ruffelle and Alison Ruffelle. Young's granddaughter is pop singer Eliza Doolittle.

Young died on 30 July 2025, at the age of 85.

== Styles and honours ==
She was the subject of This Is Your Life in December 1998 when she was surprised by Michael Aspel at the Sylvia Young Theatre School. Young was appointed Officer of the Order of the British Empire (OBE) in the 2005 Birthday Honours for her services to the arts.
