= Alison Jiear =

Australian singer, actress (b. 1965)

- Born: Alison Jiear; 6 May 1965 (age 61); Australia
- Occupations: Actress, singer
- Website: www.alisonjiear.com

Alison Jiear (born 6 May 1965) is a popular cabaret artist and musical theatre performer on the London cabaret circuit. Jiear was trained at the Queensland Conservatorium of Music, Australia.

== Life and career ==
Jiear was one of The Fabulous Singlettes, an Australian girl trio specialising in Motown girl group covers. They appeared at London's Piccadilly Theatre in 1988.

Her West End musical theatre credits include Shoes at the Sadler's Wells Theatre, On the Town at the English National Opera & Theater Du Chatelet, Paris, Hot Mikado, Jerry Springer: The Opera at the Royal National Theatre and Sydney Opera House and Grease. She was also featured in the motion picture Being Julia.

Jiear was nominated for the 2004 Laurence Olivier Award for Best Actress in a Musical for her role in Jerry Springer: The Opera, in which she played the character of Shawntel, a woman who dreams of becoming a pole dancer. Though never paid for the project, a remixed version of her rendition of "I Just Wanna Dance" from the musical became a popular dance track in nightclubs in the U.S., Europe and Australia.

In 2005, she also starred in a humorous Burger King commercial in the UK that pastiched Meat Loaf's music videos. In March 2009, Jiear duetted with Tina Arena at the Sydney Gay & Lesbian Mardi Gras party in the 3am show singing "No More Tears (Enough Is Enough)". She opened the party with her dance club hit "I Just Wanna Dance".

Her solo Albums include "Forgiveness' Embrace" and "Simply Alison Jiear", both available on iTunes or through her website. Her live CD "Live at Pizza on the Park" is due for release. She also appeared in the Les Misérables film (2012), based on the musical of the same name.

In May 2015 Jiear appeared on Britain's Got Talent singing You'll Never Walk Alone. She received a yes from all 4 judges, and was picked as one of 45 acts to advance to the semi-finals. She performed in the second semi-final on 26 May, but came 8th in the public vote, therefore not advancing to the final.

Following her appearance on Britain's Got Talent she was cast in George Stiles & Anthony Drewe's family musical The 3 Little Pigs. Opening at the Palace Theatre, London in Summer 2015.
