= Jazz Line-Up =

BBC radio programme

Jazz Line-Up is a programme of jazz music that was broadcast on Saturday afternoons on BBC Radio 3. It was first broadcast in April 2000 and the final episode was on 31 March 2018. The programme was created by Lindsay Pell and produced by Pell, Keith Loxam and Sushil Dade.

It was succeeded on 7 April 2018 by a new Radio 3 programme, J to Z.
