= Ten Lives =

Studio album by Gwyneth Herbert
- Released: 1 July 2008
- Genre: Jazz; Singer-songwriter
- Length: 39:51
- Label: Real World Records/Bowers and Wilkins

Gwyneth Herbert chronology
Between Me and the Wardrobe (2006)	Ten Lives (2008)	All the Ghosts (2009)

Ten Lives, the fourth album by British singer-songwriter and jazz musician Gwyneth Herbert, was released on 18 July 2008.

== History ==
In early 2008, Herbert was commissioned by a collaborative project between Peter Gabriel and Bowers & Wilkins to record an acoustic album at Gabriel's Real World Studios. The result of these sessions – Ten Lives – was released as a digital download in July 2008, available only from the Bowers & Wilkins website as part of their Music Club. The music was later made available for downloading from other music websites.

Remixed versions of these songs, all written by Herbert, formed the basis of her 2009 album All the Ghosts.

== Track listing ==
No	Title	Lyrics and music	Length	
1	"So Worn Out"	Gwyneth Herbert	3:36	
2	"My Narrow Man"	Gwyneth Herbert	3:37	
3	"Lorelei"	Gwyneth Herbert	3:39	
4	"Nataliya"	Gwyneth Herbert	2:59	
5	"Put Your Money Where Your Mouth is"	Gwyneth Herbert	4:42	
6	"Petite Cacahuète"	Gwyneth Herbert	3:27	
7	"Jane Into A Beauty Queen"	Gwyneth Herbert	3:04	
8	"My Mini and Me"	Gwyneth Herbert	4:34	
9	"Si C'est ça"	Gwyneth Herbert	2:54	
10	"Some Days I Forget"	Gwyneth Herbert	3:34	
11	"Midnight Oil"	Gwyneth Herbert	3:35	Total length = 39:51
