= James Gillan (actor) =

Scottish actor

- Born: James Gillan Paterson; 30 August 1974 (age 51); Glasgow, Scotland
- Occupation: Actor
- Website: http://www.jamesgillan.org/

James Gillan (born James Gillan Paterson) is a Scottish stage actor born in Glasgow, and trained at The Arts Educational Schools in London.

In 1993 Gillan landed the role of Benjamin in the first national tour of Joseph and the Technicolour Dreamcoat and left Arts Educational in Chiswick, to start his career.

His most notable roles include Rusty in Starlight Express (London/UK tour), the title role in "Pippin " (the Bridewell theatre), the title role in the Royal Festival Hall's Peter Pan, or the Boy Who Wouldn't Grow Up, Marilyn in Taboo (UK tour), Pinball lad and u/s Tommy in Tommy and Boq in Wicked (original London cast, September 2006 through June 2008).

Gillan, who attended Bellarmine Secondary School in Glasgow's Pollok area, was nominated for a 1997 Laurence Olivier Theatre Award for Best Supporting Performance in a Musical of 1996 for his role in Tommy. Other nominations include a TMA for best performance in a musical with the other company members of Stephen Sondheim's Assassins (Sheffield Crucible), playing John Hinckley Jr.

Gillan is the brother of George Paterson of the Scottish rock group DMP. In 2008, he recorded a song for the CD Act One – Songs from the Musicals of Alexander S. Bermange, an album of 20 new recordings by 26 West End stars. The CD was released in November 2008 on Dress Circle Records.

From November 2008 through January 2009, Gillan returned to the role of Peter Pan in the musical adaption of the play by George Stiles and Anthony Drewe.and recorded the show for Stiles and Drewe.

He starred in a minor role as a shop assistant in The Inbetweeners episode "Will's Dilemma", which aired in the UK on 27 September 2010. Other TV credits include Casualty, Doctors, The Seven Industrial Wonders of the World and the CBS concert of A Tale of Cities.

From November 2010 through January 2011, Gillan played the role of Colin in the musical adaptation of Frances Hodgson Burnett's classic children's novel The Secret Garden. The show played at the Birmingham Repertory Theatre.

Other roles include:

- Seymour in Little Shop of Horrors (Aberystwyth Arts Theatre, Summer Season 2013)
- Mr. Tumnus in The Lion, The Witch, and The Wardrobe (The Rose Theatre Kingston, November 2014-January 2015)
- Lady Puck in The Donkey Show (Camden Proud Galleries, June 2016-August 2016)
- Tray Sophisticay in Everybody’s Talking About Jamie (Sheffield Crucible, February 2017/ West End 2017- 2020)
- Lord Farquaad in Shrek the Musical (UK and Ireland Tour 2023 - )
