= A Perfect Fit =

A Perfect Fit may refer to:

- A Perfect Fit (2005 film)
- A Perfect Fit (2021 film)
- A Perfect Fit, a song by Oh Land, from the soundtrack Askepot
