= Michael Matus (actor) =

British actor

Michael Matus is a British actor.

== Career ==
Matus originated the role of Benoit in the 1996 musical 'Martin Guerre'. He performed in the 2002 production of Helen Edmundson's adaptation of The Mill on the Floss at the Kennedy Centre, for which he was nominated for a Helen Hayes Award.

Matus starred as Dionysos in The Frogs at the Jermyn Street Theatre in 2017.

In March 2025, he'll join the West End cast of Wicked as The Wizard of Oz.

== Filmography ==
=== Film ===
| Year | Title | Role | Notes |
|---|---|---|---|
| 2020 | As Seen: The Passion of Phil Smith | Phil Smith | Short film |
| 2020 | Little Games | Gilbert | Short film |
| 2022 | The Mystery of Marilyn Monroe: The Unheard Tapes | Milton Greene | |

=== Television ===
| Year | Title | Role | Notes |
|---|---|---|---|
| 1991 | EastEnders | Jeff | 2 episodes |
| 1992 | The Bill | Billings | Episode: "Letting Go" |
| 1998 | A Prince Among Men | Nick Younger | Episode: "All in the Game" |
| 2012 | Endeavour | Cyril Wright | Episode: "Pilot" |
| 2018 | National Theatre Live | Oswald | Episode: "King Lear" |
| 2020 | Shakespeare & Hathaway: Private Investigators | Tom Porter | Episode: "All That Glisters" |
| 2020 | Housebound | Crispin Thomas MP | 3 episodes |
| 2021 | Invasion | Business Man | Episode: "First Day" |
| 2022 | The Lazarus Project | Ian | 2 episodes |
| 2025 | Suspect: The Shooting of Jean Charles de Menezes | Cmdr. John McDowall | 2 episodes |

=== Video games ===
| Year | Title | Role | Notes |
|---|---|---|---|
| 2023 | De-Exit: Eternal Matters | | |
| 2026 | Resident Evil Requiem | Hotel Manager | |
