= Frances Ruffelle =

English actress and singer (born 1965)

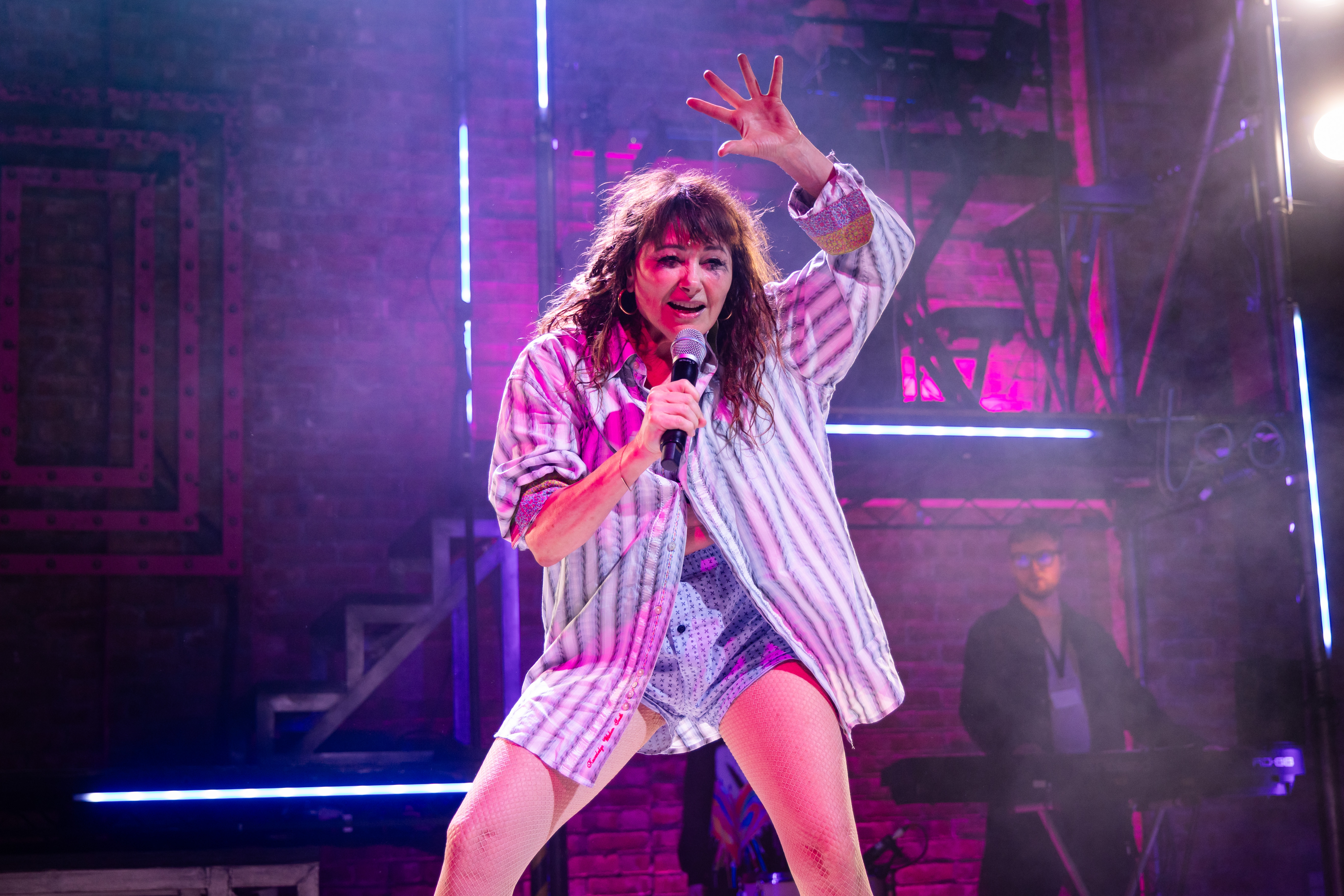
- Ruffelle in "I Can Die Too" at Pitlochry Festival Theatre (2026)
- Born: Frances Jane Ruffelle; 29 August 1965 (age 61); Redbridge, London, England
- Other name: Frankie Ruff
- Occupations: Actress, singer
- Years active: 1975–present
- Spouse: John Caird (m. 1990; div. 1993)
- Children: 2, including Eliza Doolittle
- Parent(s): Sylvia Young; Norman Ruffell
- Website: francesruffelle.com

Frances Ruffelle (born 29 August 1965) is an English musical theatre actress and singer. She won a Tony Award in 1987, and represented the United Kingdom in the Eurovision Song Contest 1994 with the song "Lonely Symphony (We Will Be Free)", finishing 10th. The song became a UK Top 30 hit.

In 1984, Ruffelle starred as Dinah in the original West End production of Starlight Express. From 1985, she was the original Éponine in the first English-language productions of Les Misérables in the West End and on Broadway, winning the 1987 Tony Award for Best Featured Actress in a Musical. Other stage roles include Yonah in Children of Eden (1991), Roxie Hart in Chicago (2003–04, 2007), the title role in Piaf (2013), Bella in The A–Z of Mrs P (2014), and Queenie in The Wild Party. Her albums include Fragile (1994), Frances Ruffelle (1998), Showgirl (2004), Imperfectly Me (2010), and I Say Yeh-Yeh (2015).

== Career ==
As well as her later stage work, Ruffelle has also gained success on the screen. Her film credits include roles in The Wildcats of St Trinian's (1980), P'tang, Yang, Kipperbang (1982), Secrets & Lies (1996), The Road to Ithaca (1999), Les Misérables (2012), Devil's Tower (2014), and Long Forgotten Fields (2014).

Ruffelle's first West End appearance was as Louisa in Terence Rattigan's The Sleeping Prince. In 1984, she took on the principal role of Dinah in Andrew Lloyd Webber's Starlight Express in the original London cast. A year later, she left Starlight and joined the original London cast of Les Misérables as Éponine. Though virtually an unknown outside of the West End, she and Colm Wilkinson were invited to reprise their roles for the Broadway launch. Ruffelle won multiple awards (including the Tony) for her role. She returned to the role she originated in 1997 in the West End of London. Her subsequent work on stage included the Ian Dury musical Apples in 1989 and Stephen Schwartz's Children of Eden in 1990, featuring on the cast albums of both. She has also starred as the female lead Roxie Hart in Chicago, as well as appearing in Lucky Stiff.

The creative team behind Les Misérables, Claude-Michel Schönberg and Alain Boublil, also used Ruffelle's vocals as Kim while writing Miss Saigon. She also workshopped Andrew Lloyd Webber's Sunset Boulevard and Whistle Down the Wind.

Having previously played Roxie Hart in Chicago in the West End from September 2003 to June 2004, Ruffelle reprised the role for the show's 10th anniversary in 2007 and stayed with the production through into 2008. Her return to Chicago marked the first time she had performed in the show at the Cambridge Theatre, having only appeared in it when it was on at the Adelphi Theatre.

Ruffelle was set to appear in a revival of the Sherman Brothers musical Over Here! in January 2007, alongside Donna McKechnie, Diane Langton and Richard Fleeshman, however it was postponed, and was scheduled to open in Toronto in 2009.

In 2006, she performed in a musical based on the works of Stephen Schwartz, Schwartz Stories. In March 2008, she commenced a limited five-week season in the musical, Make Me A Song. She played the title role in Mathilde at the Edinburgh festival in 2008.

Ruffelle appeared as series regular Dawn Daniel-Spears in Sky's Dream Team, and series regular Kitty in Headless, for which she also composed the music.

Other television credits include playing Olivia in Warner Bros' New Adventures of Robin Hood, Denise in Alan Bennett's Objects of Affection for the BBC and Susan in SWALK for Thames Television. She has starred in The Bill (Thames Television), Strangers (ITV), The Equaliser (Universal) and The Hard Word (Thames Television).

Ruffelle was chosen to represent the United Kingdom at the Eurovision Song Contest 1994. She sang all eight songs at the pre-selection, and British televoters chose "Lonely Symphony" to represent the UK, by televoting. It went on to come in 10th at the contest in Dublin. When asked about her motivations for joining the competition, she jokingly replied that since none of the four constituent nations of the UK (Wales, Scotland, England and Northern Ireland) had qualified for that year's football World Cup finals, it was her responsibility to try to restore some national pride.

In 2010, she appeared in the 25th Anniversary Concert of Les Misérables at the O2 Arena as part of the original London cast and in 2011 starred as Fastrada at the Menier Theatre's production of Pippin.

She opened in the title role of Piaf in Pam Gems' Piaf in February 2013 and received a UK Theatre award nomination for Best Actor and in 2014 created the role of Bella in The A–Z of Mrs P at Southwark Playhouse. Ruffelle also performs her critically acclaimed solo shows, Paris Original and Beneath the Dress, in London and New York.

In 2015, Ruffelle played the role of Naomi Green in the ITV sitcom Birds of a Feather. She appeared in three episodes.

=== Theatre credits ===
- 2024: Billie Trix, Closer To Heaven, The Turbine Theatre
- 2017: Queenie, The Wild Party, The Other Palace
- 2014: Bella, The A–Z of Mrs P, Southwark Playhouse
- 2013: Piaf, Leicester Curve Theatre
- 2011 Fastrada, Pippin, Menier Chocolate Factory, Mitch Sebastian
- 2010 Angelique Picard, Songs from a Hotel Bedroom, Linbury Studio ROH/Tour, Kate Flatt
- 2010 One Woman Show, Beneath the Dress, Edinburgh Festival 2010/London, Paul Baker
- 2008 Mathilde, George Square, Edinburgh, Simon Callow
- 2008 Make Me a Song: The Music of William Finn, New Players Theatre, Andrew McBean
- 2007 Roxie Hart, Chicago, Adelphi Theatre, Walter Bobbie
- Betty Shaefer, Sunset Boulevard, Andrew Lloyd Webber's Sydmonton Festival
- Annabel, Lucky Stiff, Bridewell Theatre, Steven Dexter
- Candy, Whistle Down the Wind, Sydmonton Festival, Gail Edwards
- Delilah, Apples, Royal Court Theatre, Simon Curtis
- Eponine, Les Misérables, Royal Shakespeare Co/Broadway, John Caird/Trevor Nunn – Tony, Theatre World, Helen Hayes and Outer Critics Circle Award
- Yonah, Children of Eden, Upstart – West End, John Caird
- Dinah, Starlight Express, Really Useful Theatre Company, Trevor Nunn
- Princess Louisa, The Sleeping Prince, Theatre Royal Haymarket, Peter Coe
- Narrator, Joseph and the Amazing Technicolor Dreamcoat, National Tour, Bill Kenwright

=== Film credits ===
- The Wildcats of St Trinian's (1980)
- P'tang, Yang, Kipperbang (1982)
- Secrets & Lies (1996)
- The Road to Ithaca (1999)
- Les Misérables (2012)
- Devil's Tower (2014)
- Long Forgotten Fields (2014)

=== Television credits ===
- Elsie in Strangers (1981, 1 episode)
- Denise in Objects of Affection (1982, 1 episode)
- Mandy in The Hard Word (1983, 1 episode)
- Jackie in Tucker's Luck (1985, 2 episodes)
- Sylvie in The Equalizer (1988, Episode: "The Child Broker")
- Susan Gilbert in The Bill (series 9) (1993, 1 episode)
- Olivia in The New Adventures of Robin Hood (1997, 1 episode)
- Kitty in Headless (2000)
- Dawn Daniel-Spears in Dream Team (2001, 20 episodes)
- Naomi in Birds of a Feather (2015, 3 episodes)

=== Radio ===
- 1996, Mary in Jesus Christ Superstar in Concert BBC Radio 2
- 2009, Guest Soloist, Friday Night Is Music Night (Judy Garland Special), BBC Radio 2

=== Music career ===
"Lonely Symphony" was released as a single in the UK, as well as in other countries, and also appeared on her first solo album, Fragile. It reached number 25 in the UK Singles Chart in April 1994.

Ruffelle's second album, Frances Ruffelle, came out in 1998, on the small Dress Circle label. It was a change in direction, featuring stripped-down arrangements of mostly musical theatre songs, as well as a couple of classics, original songs and covers. In 2004, she released Showgirl on her own label, a return to fuller arrangements, but far from a pop sound. Ruffelle also collaborated with Sam Bonner in the group, paTala, making an album called Purify, featuring "a fusion of traditional Sanskrit chants with unique arrangements of contemporary Western beats". A new solo album, Imperfectly Me, was released in September 2010.

== Personal life ==
Ruffelle was born in Redbridge district of Ilford in London, England, UK. Her father is a phone company engineer and manager. Her mother was Sylvia Young, the founder of the prestigious theatre school at which she trained.

Ruffelle married director John Caird in 1990. They have two children: a daughter, Eliza Doolittle, and a son Nathaniel. They divorced in 1993.

== Discography ==
=== Cast recordings ===
- Starlight Express Original London Cast (1984)
- Les Misérables Original London Cast (1985)
- Les Misérables Original Broadway Cast (1987)
- Mack & Mabel In Concert (1988)
- Apples Original London Cast (1989)
- Children of Eden Original London Cast (1991)
- Les Misérables Highlights Original London Cast (2009)

=== Solo albums ===
- Fragile (1994)
- Frances Ruffelle (1998)
- Showgirl (2004)
- Purify (2005) as PaTala, with Sam Bonner
- Imperfectly Me (2010)
- I Say Yeh-Yeh (2015)

=== Album appearances ===
- Back of My Mind (Christopher Cross album) (1988) includes "I Will (Take You Forever)" duet
- Michael Crawford Performs Andrew Lloyd Webber (1991) includes "Only You" duet
- Save the Children: A Christmas Spectacular of Carols and Songs (1992) sings "I Watch You Sleeping", and featured on "Save the Children"
- Corps & Armes (Etienne Daho album) (2000) – includes "Le Brasier", co-written by Daho/Ruffelle/Helen Turner; also released as a single
- The Definitive Christopher Cross (2001) includes "I Will (Take You Forever)" (new mix)

=== Singles ===
- "He's My Hero" (1986)
- "On My Own" (rerecorded single version) (1985) – from Les Misérables
- "On My Own" (second rerecorded single version) (1987) – from Les Misérables
- "I Will (Take You Forever)" (1988) – duet with Christopher Cross from Back of My Mind – US Adult Contemporary Chart No. 41
- "Stranger to the Rain" (rerecorded single version) (1990) – from Children of Eden
- "Love Parade" (1994)
- "Lonely Symphony (We Will Be Free)" (1994) – UK Eurovision Song Contest entry
- "Lose Your Illusions" (1994)
- "God Watch Over You" (1995)
- "Jennifer's Garden" (1997) (Denmark only)
- "Blue Eyes" (1997) (Germany only)
- "If a Wish Came True" (1998) (Netherlands only)
- "Smile" (2004)

Preceded by Sonia with "Better the Devil You Know"	UK in the Eurovision Song Contest; 1994	Succeeded by Love City Groove with "Love City Groove"
