= Travels with My Aunt (musical) =

2016 musical

- Music: George Stiles
- Lyrics: Anthony Drewe
- Basis: Travels with My Aunt by Graham Greene
- Premiere: 18 April 2016: Minerva Theatre, Chichester
- Productions: 2016 Chichester

Travels with My Aunt is a musical with music and lyrics by George Stiles and Anthony Drewe and a book by Ron Cowen and Daniel Lipman, based on the 1969 novel of the same name by Graham Greene.

== Production history ==
=== Chichester (2016) ===
The musical made its world premiere at the Minerva Theatre, Chichester as part of the Festival 2016, beginning previews from 18 April (with an opening night on 26 April), running until 4 June 2016. The production was directed by Christopher Luscombe, designed by Colin Falconer with choreography by Ewan Jones, orchestrations by Nicholas Skilbeck, musical direction by Mark Aspinall, lighting by Tim Mitchell and sound by Paul Groothuis. It starred starring Patricia Hodge as Aunt August and Steven Pacey as Henry.
