= Between Me and the Wardrobe =

Studio album by Gwyneth Herbert
- Released: 2006
- Genre: Jazz; Singer-songwriter
- Length: 43:06
- Label: Monkeywood Records; reissued by Blue Note Records
- Producer: Seb Rochford

Gwyneth Herbert chronology
Bittersweet and Blue (2004)	Between Me and the Wardrobe (2006)	Ten Lives (2008)

Professional ratings
Review scores
Source	Rating
The Observer	5/5 stars

Between Me and the Wardrobe is the third album by British singer-songwriter Gwyneth Herbert and her first album to consist entirely of her own songs. It was released in 2006 on Herbert's own Monkeywood Records label and reissued in 2007 by Blue Note Records. A review in The Observer gave the album a five-star rating.

== Production and release ==
After she left Universal Classics and Jazz to pursue a less commercial and more personal musical direction, Herbert collaborated with Polar Bear's Seb Rochford in a production role for this album. Self-financed by Herbert, it was recorded in three days and was never intended for general release. It was initially released, in 2006, on Herbert's own Monkeywood label before being picked up by Blue Note Records, making Herbert their first UK signing in 30 years.

== Reception ==
In a five-starred review for The Observer, Stuart Nicholson said that on Between Me and the Wardrobe Herbert "lets the lyrics do the work for her. They are well thought out, moving between artfully constructed soft-focus simplicities to poignant yearning".

Colin Buttimer, writing for BBC Music, said: "stories are very much to the fore, in fact many of these songs are compacted narrative jewels... The music is oak-like, rich and weathered... Seb Rochford, best known as the strikingly hirsute drummer for Polar Bear, Fulborn Taversham and Acoustic Ladyland, is responsible for a production that’s stripped-down, but full of unexpected and highly rewarding details".

John Fordham, in a review for The Guardian, said: "Herbert's originals (all the pieces are hers) connect more with Janis Ian or Rufus Wainwright than the standards the subtly intelligent Herbert at first seemed destined for. Jazzers might be foxed by Blue Note's endorsement of this low-key, folk-inflected and very personal vision, but... the lyrics gleam with individuality... and though the tunes could have used a few more twists and turns, it confirms that Herbert is light years from the whisper-in-your-ear Krall clone some dismissed her as".

== Track listing ==
No	Title	Lyrics and music	Length	
1	"Lay You Down"	Gwyneth Herbert	2:58	
2	"Whisper Low"	Gwyneth Herbert	4:07	
3	"The Woman meets the Wiseman"	Gwyneth Herbert	2:06	
4	"Midnight Oil"	Gwyneth Herbert	3:35	
5	"Little Girl"	Gwyneth Herbert	3:33	
6	"The Morning After"	Gwyneth Herbert	4:43	
7	"Slow Down, Brother"	Gwyneth Herbert	4:49	
8	"That's the Kind of Man"	Gwyneth Herbert	3:48	
9	"In the Meantime"	Gwyneth Herbert	4:15	
10	"Sweet Thing"	Gwyneth Herbert	3:41	
11	"Turn it Off"	Gwyneth Herbert	5:05	
12	"Going for a Song"	Gwyneth Herbert	5:38	Total length = 43:06
