= Birds Eye View =

UK charitable organisation

The Birds Eye View logo

Birds Eye View (BEV) is a UK charitable organisation established in 2002 to celebrate and support women's work in film, most notably by way of an annual film festival in London that places women at the heart of the creative vision. The last festival was held in 2014, and since 2015 they have operated a year-round charitable mission to bring ever-greater audiences to films by women, funded by the British Film Institute, under their 'Reclaim The Frame' banner.

== Overview and history ==
Birds Eye View was founded by Rachel Millward and Pinny Grylls in 2002, to celebrate and support women filmmakers. Backed by key figures in the film industry, Birds Eye View describes its work as "a positive response to the fact that (as of 2005) women make up only 7% of directors and 12% of writers in the film industry". The organisation's work includes an annual festival of films by women filmmakers, held in London, as well as a touring programme and year-round training and career development programmes for emerging women filmmakers in the UK. In addition to promoting work by women filmmakers, Birds Eye View aims to educate audiences about the importance of diversity in film, and to widen the audiences for women-made films and world cinema.

== Birds Eye View Film Festival, London ==
Founded as a short film event in 2002, Birds Eye View registered as a charity in 2004, launched the UK's first major women's film festival in 2005, and now operates year-round activity through its BEV Labs, First Weekenders Club, touring programme and online community, in addition to an annual festival in London. Prominent filmmakers and artists to have worked with Birds Eye View include Kim Longinotto, Lucy Walker, Wanuri Kahiu, Mary Harron, Bella Freud, Drew Barrymore, Susanne Bier, Peace Anyiam-Fiberesima, Tracey Emin, Xiao Jiang, Andrea Arnold, Gillian Wearing, Beeban Kidron and Marilyn Gaunt.

For each annual festival, Birds Eye View commissions and produces Sound & Silents, a live-music event whereby leading female musicians perform live, specially-written sets to classic silent films. Musicians to have participated in Sound & Silents include Imogen Heap, Natalie Clein, Bishi, Mira Calix, Patti Plinko, Gwyneth Herbert, The Elysian Quartet, Zoe Rahman, Broken Hearts DJs and JUICE.

== The Birds Eye View team ==
Birds Eye View's director is co-founder Rachel Millward, who is currently the Clore Fellow for Film. She was named as one of 50 "Women to Watch" by Arts Council England and the Cultural Leadership Programme. Millward was also previously nominated as a "World Changing Woman" by The Guardian in August 2006.

Birds Eye View is chaired by producer Elizabeth Karlsen (The Crying Game, Little Voice, Made in Dagenham), and patrons include Mike Figgis, Mira Nair, Joanna Lumley, Juliet Stevenson, Martha Fiennes, Stephen Woolley and Gurinder Chadha.

== Birds Eye View in the UK ==
Highlights of the Birds Eye View Film Festival programme typically tour the UK throughout the year, playing at regional cinemas such as Home in Manchester and the Glasgow Film Theatre, as well as music and arts festivals including Big Chill and Latitude. The most common touring programmes include screenings of silent films with new live scores by female musicians, which BEV regularly commissions as part of its Sound & Silents programme. The Festival also takes special events to the Edinburgh and Cannes international film festivals.

== The Birds Eye View Awards ==
The Birds Eye View Awards are presented annually to the best feature, documentary and short films screened at the Festival, as selected by juries of leading industry figures and film critics.

Award category	Winning Film	Director
2010 Best Feature	Lourdes	Jessica Hausner
2010 Best Documentary	Junior	Jenna Rosher
2010 Best Short	Slaves and The Door (joint winners)	Hanna Heilborn & David Aronowitsch; Juanita Wilson
2009 Best Feature	Snow	Aida Begic
2009 Best Documentary	Age of Stupid	Franny Armstrong
2009 Best UK Short	Love You More	Sam Taylor-Wood
2009 Best International Short	August 15 and Solitaro Anonimo (joint winners)	Jiang Xuan and Debora Diniz
2008 Best Feature	Persepolis	Marjane Satrapi & Vincent Paronnaud
2008 Best Documentary	Hold Me Tight, Let Me Go	Kim Longinotto
2008 Best Newcomer	Hotel Very Welcome	Sonja Heiss
2008 Best Short	Sophie	Brigitte Staermose
2007 Best Film	Sherrbybaby	Laurie Collyer
2007 Best Documentary	Six Yards to Democracy	
2007 Best Film from a Developing Country	Goodbye Life	Ensieh Shah Hosseini
2007 Best Newcomer	Away From Her	Sarah Polley
2007 Most Promising UK Talent	Dreams & Desires	Joanna Quinn
2006 Best Short Drama	Cologne	Kaat Beels
2006 Best Short Comedy	Moustache	Vicki Sugars
2006 Best Short Animation	Badgered	Sharon Colman
2006 Innovation Award	Uten Tittel	Anja Breien
2005 Best International Feature	Bride of Seventh Heaven	Anastasia Lapsui & Markku Lehmuskallio
2005 Best Short Drama	Nits	Harry Wootliff
2005 Most Promising Newcomer in International Documentary	Pashke & Sofia	Karin Michalski
2005 Innovation Award	City Paradise	Gaelle Denis

== Training ==
Birds Eye View's training programmes are called the BEV Labs, made up of specialised intensive training programmes designed to develop new female filmmaker talent and bring new feature films by women into production. 2009's lab 'Last Laugh: Women Create Comedy' saw three comedy feature films from female writers taken onto the Warp X / Warp Films development slates, including work from Sally Phillips, Julia Davis and Lucy Porter. These films are currently in development. Ongoing Labs include She Writes in partnership with The Script Factory and Re:Animate in partnership with Warp Films, providing leading female screenwriters and animators with mentoring, industry events and creative support to help advance their projects towards pitching for development slates.

== The 'First Weekenders Club' ==
Birds Eye View seeks to promote films made by women through its First Weekenders Club, based on the premise that audiences, and therefore box office, from the opening weekend of a film's theatrical release, have a large impact on its future and on the future of the filmmaker. The First Weekenders Club therefore promotes the first weekend of new releases by women filmmakers. The campaign has received backing from key figures in the film industry including director Gurinder Chadha and writer Natasha Walter.

== See also ==
- List of film festivals
