= Naim Records =

Independent record label in the United Kingdom

- Founder: Julian Vereker
- Genre: Various
- Country of origin: U.K.
- Location: Salisbury, Wiltshire
- Official website: www.naimrecords.com

Naim Records, also known as Naim Label, is a small independent record label in the United Kingdom, based in Salisbury, Wiltshire. Founded by Julian Vereker, its first CD was Electric Glide by Gary Boyle. Naim Records was shortlisted for the Best Small Label award at the inaugural AIM Independent Music Awards 2011.

In June 2012 Mark Prisk, Business Minister for the UK Government, named Simon Drake, General Manager of Naim, one of 30 young rising stars of manufacturing in the Make It in Great Britain campaign.

Musicians who have recorded on Naim include Laurence Hobgood Sabina Sciubba, Phantom Limb, The Milk, Tellison, Max Raptor, Gwyneth Herbert, Jon Thorne & Danny Thompson, William Fitzsimmons, Jeniferever, AM, Boy Com, Sons of Kemet, and Elektralux.
