= Anthony Drewe =

British lyricist

Anthony Drewe is a British lyricist and book writer for Broadway and West End musicals. He is best known for his collaborations with George Stiles.

== Education ==
He was educated at Maidstone Grammar School between 1974–1980. He studied Zoology at Exeter University between 1980–1983 where he met his writing partner George Stiles.

== Collaboration with George Stiles ==
For more than 30 years, Drewe has worked with the composer George Stiles. Together they have written eleven shows (see below). Projects currently in development include: Soap Dish; an adaptation of Graham Greene's Travels with My Aunt; and a new project with the director and choreographer Jerry Mitchell.

=== Tutankhamun ===
Tutankhamun was first performed at the Northcott Theatre and Imagination Buildings in 1984.

=== Just So ===
Just So was co-produced by Cameron Mackintosh at the Watermill in 1989 where it was directed by Julia McKenzie. A further production was mounted in 1990 directed by Mike Ockrent at the Tricycle Theatres in the UK. The celebrated Goodspeed Opera House in Connecticut produced a new version of the show in 1996.

In 2001, Anthony Drewe directed an extensively reworked version at Boston’s North Shore Music Theatre in the USA, with designs by Peter McKintosh and choreography by Stephen Mear. With the same team, Anthony directed the 2004 Chichester Festival Theatre production, which received glowing reviews and proved to be a big hit.

=== Honk! ===
Honk! was commissioned by the Watermill Theatre (1993). Under the direction of Julia McKenzie it was developed at the Stephen Joseph Theatre (1997) in a production designed by Peter McKintosh and choreographed by Aletta Collins. In 1999, during Trevor Nunn's time as artistic director at the National Theatre, Julia Mackenzie was invited to restage her production in the Olivier Theatre. It was the first new British musical to be produced in the history of the National Theatre.

Honk! won three Best Musical awards – the 2000 Laurence Olivier Award, the FNB VITA Award in South Africa, and the Elliot Norton Award in the United States. The National Theatre production toured the UK in 2001.

It is frequently produced by schools and community theatre groups. Honk! has been seen by more than 6 million people all over the world in over 8,000 productions in more than 20 languages.

=== Peter Pan ===
Peter Pan: A Musical Adventure won Best Song (When I Kill Peter Pan, performed by Denis Quilley) and the Orchestra's Award for Best Musical at the 1997 International Musical of the Year. It premiered in 1999 at the Ny Theater, Copenhagen.

In 2001, it was performed at the Royal Festival Hall, starring John Thaw, Jenna Russell, Joe MacFadden and Sheila Hancock accompanied by the BBC Concert Orchestra. The performance also boasted a first in that three real-life siblings, Laura Michelle Kelly and her brothers Jorim and Nathan played Wendy, Michael and John. The BBC broadcast the concert on New Year's Eve 2001. Following the concert’s success, a fuller semi-staged version, with the Royal Philharmonic Orchestra, ran for 6 weeks at the Royal Festival Hall over Christmas 2002 starring Richard Wilson and James Gillan, with Susannah York as the Storyteller and Lottie Meyer as Wendy.

In 2007, the show was given its British theatrical premiere in a fully fledged production at the Birmingham Repertory Theatre as directed by Rachel Kavanaugh. In the summer of 2011, it made its American premiere at the Tri-County Performing Arts Center in Pottstown, Pennsylvania, recently renamed Steel River Playhouse. The production made its Canadian premiere with the St. Albert Children's Theatre in St. Albert, Alberta in November 2011.

In October 2015 a concert version directed by Jonathan Butterell was performed at London's Adelphi Theatre with Bradley Walsh as Hook, Ray Quinn as Peter Pan, Sheila Hancock as The Storyteller and Jenna Russell as Mrs Darling.

=== Mary Poppins ===
George Stiles and Anthony Drewe were commissioned by Cameron Mackintosh and Disney to write additional material augmenting the Sherman Brothers' original Academy Award winning Disney's classic 1964 film song score. The stage musical featured a new book by Downton Abbey writer and Academy Award winner Julian Fellowes. Mary Poppins opened at the Prince Edward Theatre in December 2004 where it had a hugely successful 3-year run before embarking on a UK national tour in 2008. It opened on Broadway in 2006 where it ran for 6 years at the New Amsterdam Theatre. A US tour hit the road in 2009, touring for over 2 years. A new production opened at the Ronacher Theatre in Vienna in 2014.

In the autumn of 2015 it embarked on a new UK Tour.

=== Betty Blue Eyes ===
Betty Blue Eyes opened at the Novello Theatre in April 2011 produced by Cameron Mackintosh, starring Sarah Lancashire and Reece Shearsmith. It received rave reviews from critics and audiences alike and received nominations for ‘Best New Musical’ in the 2012 Laurence Olivier Awards, The Evening Standard Awards and the WhatsOnStage.com Awards.

The show received its US premiere at the Music Theatre of Wichita, Kansas in July 2013. A UK tour of ran from March–August 2014.

=== Soho Cinders ===
The show was premiered at a sold-out concert performance at the Queen's Theatre in October 2011 in aid of The Teenage Cancer Trust. A full staged production opened at the Soho Theatre in the summer of 2012.

Further productions have been staged in Dallas, Texas, at the Arts Educational School, London, University of Cumbria, University of West England, and it will open in 2015 in Belgium.

=== Three Little Pigs ===
The Three Little Pigs was commissioned by the Singapore Repertory Theatre for their Little Company and forms the first in a “trilogy of trios” (along with Goldilocks And The Three Bears and The Three Billy Goats Gruff). It premiered for 70 sell-out performances at the DBS Arts Centre in Singapore in March 2012 (in English), and returned for a further four week run at the same venue in July 2013 (in Mandarin).

In October 2013 it was selected for the NAMT Festival in New York – the first children’s show ever to receive that honour. Since then, there have been productions at The Greenwich Theatre, London, a hit season at Emerald City Theatre, Chicago and productions in Finland and China.

In the summer of 2015 Three Little Pigs had its West End premiere at Palace Theatre, London starring Simon Webbe as the Big Bad Wolf, Alison Jiear as Mummy Pig and Leanne Jones, Taofique Folarin and Daniel Buckley as the three piglets.

A studio cast recording featuring Gareth Gates, Alison Jiear, Clive Rowe, Amy Lennox and Lewis Barnshaw was released in 2012.

=== Goldilocks and the Three Bears ===
Goldilocks and the Three Bears was commissioned by the Singapore Repertory Theatre and premiered there in 2013. The Mandarin production opened that same year.

A studio cast recording featuring David Bedella, James Gillan, Leanne Jones, Amy Lennox and Michael Xavier was released in 2015.

=== Three Billy Goats Gruff ===
Three Billy Goats Gruff was commissioned by the Singapore Repertory Theatre and premiered there in 2015.

=== Travels with My Aunt ===
Travels with My Aunt, based on the novel by Graham Greene, premiered at the Minerva Theatre, Chichester in April 2016

=== Half a Sixpence ===
Following the success of Mary Poppins, Stiles and Drewe were reunited with producer Cameron Mackintosh and book writer Julian Fellowes to create a new musical version of Half a Sixpence based on the original musical, using the original songs by David Heneker. The production premiered at Chichester Festival Theatre in July 2016 before transferring to London's West End in October 2016.

=== The Wind in the Willows ===
Commissioned by producer Jamie Hendry in 2011, The Wind in the Willows, a musical adaptation of Kenneth Grahame's novel, opens at the Theatre Royal, Plymouth in October 2016 before heading to The Lowry in Salford and London's West End.

The book was written by Julian Fellowes who Stiles and Drewe previously worked with on Mary Poppins and Half a Sixpence. The production will be directed by Rachel Kavanaugh (who also directed Half a Sixpence) with set and costume design by Peter McKintosh and lighting design by Howard Harrison.

=== Becoming Nancy ===
The musical, based on the novel "Becoming Nancy" by Terry Ronald and with a book by Elliot Davis, will debut in 2019 at the Alliance Theatre in Atlanta from Sept. 5 to Oct. 6, directed by Jerry Mitchell.

=== Identical ===
Based on the 1949 novel Lottie and Lisa by Erich Kästner (also known as the basis for Disney's The Parent Trap), Identical will premiere at the Nottingham Playhouse and Theatre Royal, Bath in summer 2020 with a book by Stuart Paterson and will be directed by Sir Trevor Nunn.

== Other ==
Stiles and Drewe are founding members of Mercury Musical Developments (MMD), a charity devoted to nurturing new musical theatre in the United Kingdom. They have also written other revues and songs for theatre, TV, and radio, including the RSC's Shakespeare Revue, The Challenge, and Dame Edna Everage's Look at Me When I'm Talking to You.

== Awards ==
Awards include the Laurence Olivier Award for Best New Musical (Honk!), an Elliot Norton Award for Outstanding Musical Production (Honk!), and a host of awards for Mary Poppins around the world. As a founding board-member of Mercury Musical Developments, Anthony also awards the annual Stiles and Drewe Prize for a new song written for the musical stage.

== Independent work as a lyricist ==
- The Card
- Twist of Fate

== Work as an actor ==
- Rouges to Riches – Porthos
- A Twist of Fate (musical)|A Twist of Fate – Inspector East

== Directing credits ==
- Snoopy – at the Watermill
- Cowardy Custard – at the Royal Academy of Music
- Honk! – in Cape Town, Chicago, and Singapore,
- Just So – at the Chicester Festival Theatre

== Additional links ==
- https://web.archive.org/web/20080312161506/http://www.playbill.com/celebritybuzz/whoswho/biography/16550.html
