= The Patsy (1928 film) =

1928 film directed by King Vidor

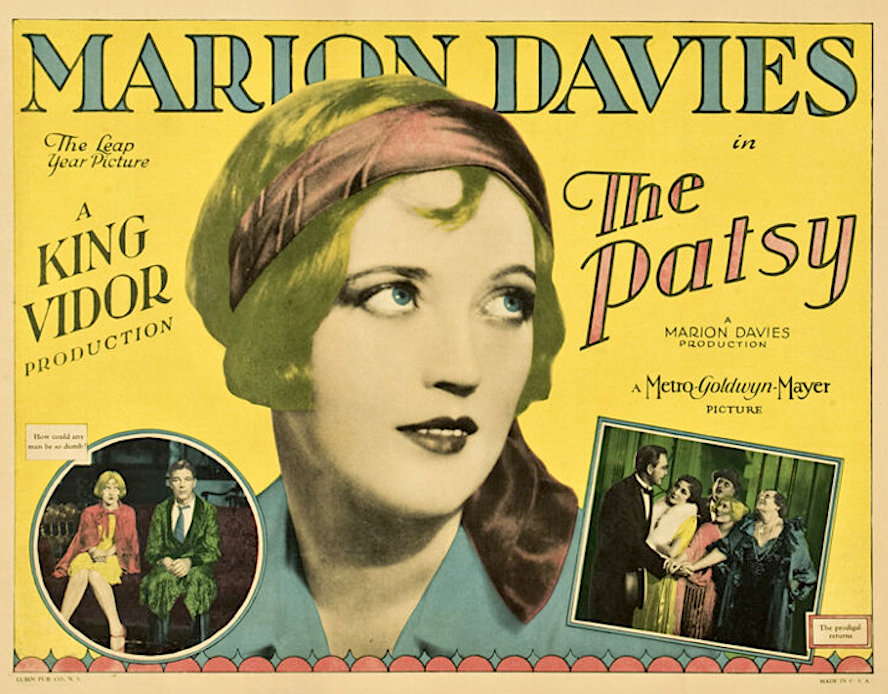
- Lobby card
- Directed by: King Vidor
- Written by: Agnes Christine Johnston; Ralph Spence
- Based on: The Patsy; 1925 play by Barry Conners
- Produced by: Marion Davies; William Randolph Hearst; King Vidor
- Starring: Marion Davies; Marie Dressler
- Cinematography: John F. Seitz
- Edited by: Hugh Wynn
- Music by: Vivek Maddala
- Production company: Metro-Goldwyn-Mayer
- Distributed by: Metro-Goldwyn-Mayer
- Release date: April 22, 1928
- Running time: 78 minutes
- Country: United States
- Language: Silent (English intertitles)
- Budget: $272,000

The Patsy (1928) by King Vidor

The Patsy is a 1928 American silent comedy-drama film directed by King Vidor, co-produced by and starring Marion Davies for Cosmopolitan Productions, and released by Metro-Goldwyn-Mayer. It was based on a play of the same name by Barry Conners, and served as Marie Dressler's comeback film after a long slump in her film career. Davies played the dowdy and downtrodden Patricia, the younger daughter in a household ruled by an imperious mother (Dressler) and selfish sister (Jane Winton).

== Cast ==
- Marion Davies as Patricia Harrington
- Orville Caldwell as Tony Anderson
- Marie Dressler as Ma Harrington
- Lawrence Gray as Billy Caldwell
- Dell Henderson as Pa Harrington
- Jane Winton as Grace Harrington

== Production ==
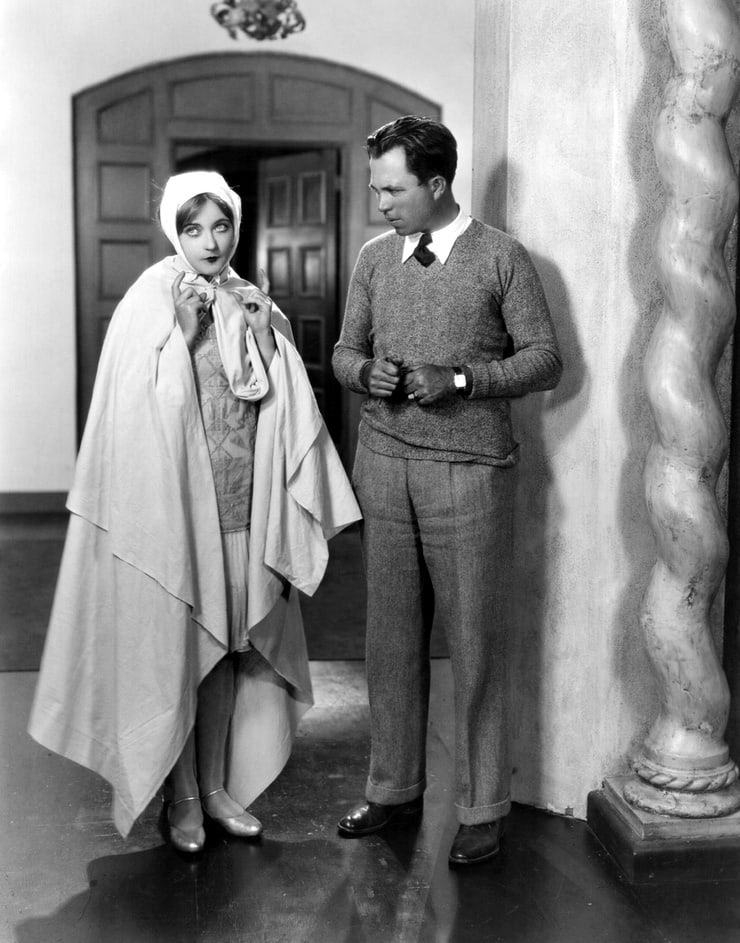
Marion Davies impersonates Lillian Gish on the set of The Patsy as King Vidor looks on.

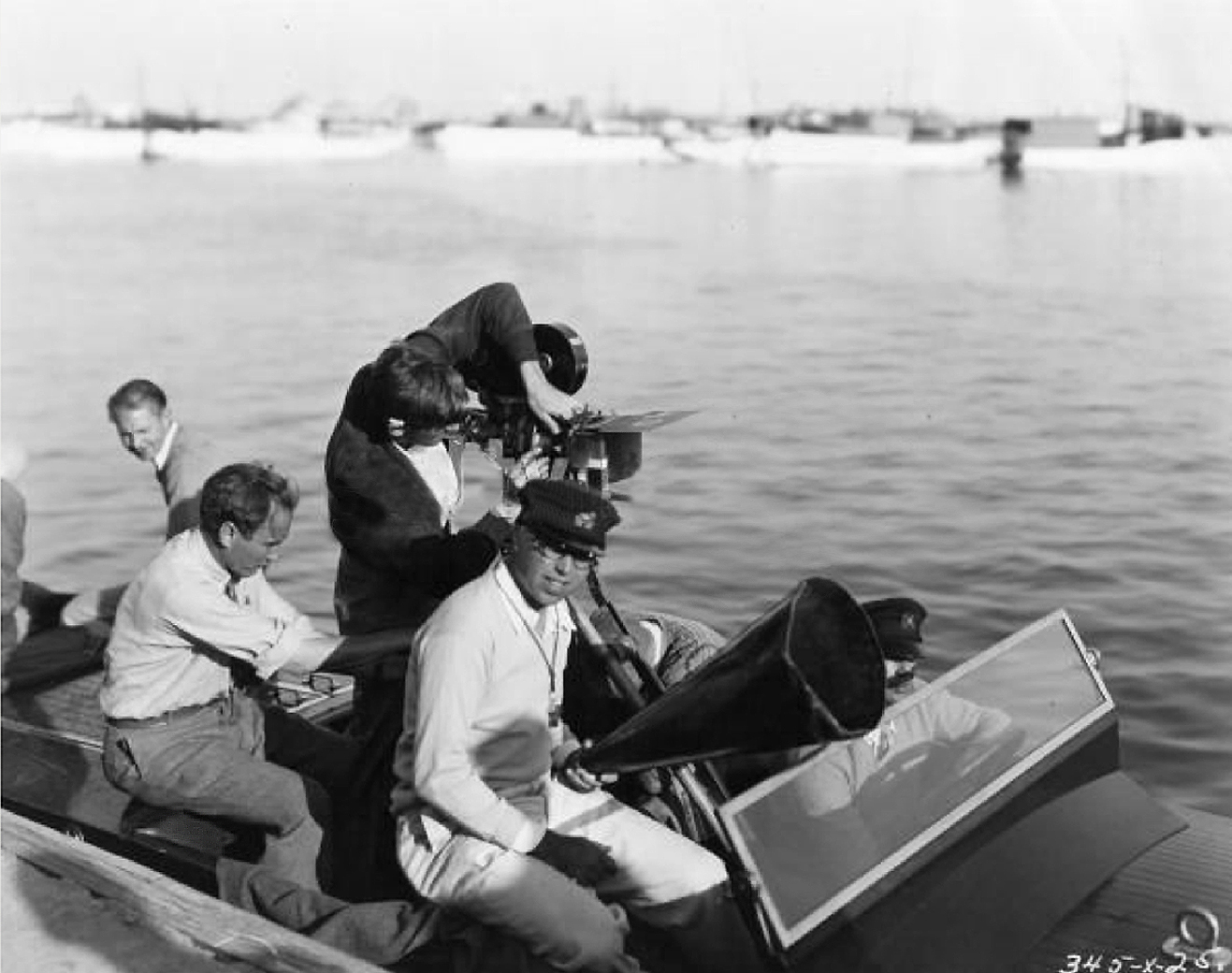
Vidor and his cameramen set out in his Hacker-Craft speedboat to film water sequences for The Patsy.

The Patsy saw Marion Davies starring in her 27th film. This was Davies' first film of three with director King Vidor and the only time she appeared with Marie Dressler.

== Release and legacy ==
The film received good reviews, and was a box office success. Hearst and MGM subsequently assigned Vidor to begin working on another vehicle for Davies. The Patsy also served as a comeback vehicle for Dressler.

In February 2020, the film was shown at the 70th Berlin International Film Festival, as part of a retrospective dedicated to King Vidor's career.

As of 2024, the film is in the public domain. On the review aggregator website Rotten Tomatoes, 100% of 20 critics' reviews are positive. The website's consensus reads: "Highlighted by Marion Davies' lively and skillful performance, The Patsy plays as an engagingly light and handsomely directed domestic comedy."
