= Mercury Musical Developments =

- Abbreviation: MMD
- Formation: 1992
- Legal status: Registered charity
- Headquarters: London
- Location: 3rd Floor, 2 Grosvenor Gardens, London SW1W 0DH
- Region served: United Kingdom
- Members: 560
- Executive Director: Emily Gray
- Website: mercurymusicals.com

Mercury Musical Developments (MMD) is the UK's largest membership organisation dedicated to developing new musical theatre writing, based in the United Kingdom dedicated to developing new writing in musical theatre. Founded in 1992 as the Mercury Workshop, it took on its present name when it merged in 1999 with the New Musicals Alliance. It now has over 560 members.

MMD is based in Grosvenor Gardens, near Victoria Station, and was previously based at the Ambassadors Theatre in London's West End. Its Executive Director is Emily Gray, who succeeded Victoria Saxton, who succeeded Neil Marcus, previously Artistic Director at the Jermyn Street Theatre, in 2015. Neil Marcus succeeded Georgina Bexon in 2009.

A registered charity, it receives funding from Arts Council England. MMD also work in consortium with Musical Theatre Network (MTN), a membership organisation who works to bring people and resources together to improve infrastructure and opportunities for new musical theatre in the UK, strengthen and diversify the new musical sector and the art form, and is a national network of venues, producers, directors, colleges and universities, organisations and individuals. Together, MMD and MTN produce BEAM, the UK's largest and only showcase of new musical theatre, curated via pitching days across England, Scotland and Wales, bringing together presentations of new musicals in development and providing networking opportunities and discussions for anyone with an interest in new musical theatre, or who is in a position to help develop and stage new British musicals.

MMD also work with founding members George Stiles and Anthony Drewe to deliver the Stiles and Drewe Best New Song Prize competition annually, and the Stiles and Drewe MTI Mentorship Award every two years.

== History ==
In 1990 composer and lyricist Stephen Sondheim took the Cameron Mackintosh chair in musical theatre at the University of Oxford, and in this capacity ran workshops with promising writers of musicals, including George Stiles, Anthony Drewe, Andrew Peggie, Paul James, and Stephen Keeling. These writers jointly set up the Mercury Workshop in 1992, which eventually merged with the New Musicals Alliance to become Mercury Musical Developments.
