= Geographers' A–Z Map Company =

British independent map publisher

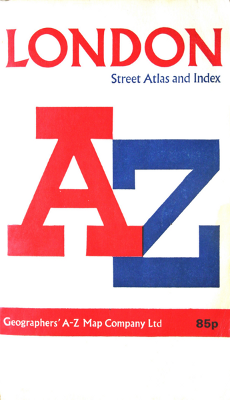
London A–Z Street Atlas

Geographers' A–Z Map Company Ltd. was the largest independent map publisher in the United Kingdom until it was bought by HarperCollins in 2019. It was based in Dunton Green, Kent.

== History ==
=== Foundation (1936) ===
Geographers' Map Company Ltd. was established in London in August 1936 by Jewish Hungarian immigrant Alexander Gross (1879 – 23 March, 1958), born Alexander Grosz in Csúrog, Austria-Hungary (now Čurug in Serbia). He already had extensive experience as a mapmaker having founded first Geographia Limited in London in 1908, and then Geographia Map Company, Inc. in New York City in 1929 after suffering financial difficulties in the 1920s. According to his son Alexander Gross Junior, "Papa never fully got over this reversal [...]. Papa vowed that in the ripeness of time he would find some way of clearing his name in England". The Geographers' Map Company Ltd. offered him that opportunity.

Gross issued the shares for Geographers' Map Company Ltd. equally amongst his two eldest children, Anthony (Tony) Gross (1905–1984) and Phyllis Isobella Pearsall (1906–1996), both recognized artists. The first offices were in Napier House, 24-27 High Holborn, and the first maps, sold to W. H. Smith & Son. They were Gross's Standard Map Of The World. They were quickly followed by the A-Z Street Atlas for London. By 1938, Geographers' Map Company Ltd. was selling 12 titles, with the maps being entirely created by skilled cartographers.

=== Rise and fall (1940s to 2010s) ===
With the outbreak of the Second World War, the government ordered the removal of street maps from sale from 1940 to 1944, so the business produced war maps for newspapers. By 1952 the company had over 30 publications covering the United Kingdom from London to Glasgow. The business expanded to 21 Gray's Inn Road after end of the war and would move to number 24 in 1953 and to number 28 in 1959. From the end of the war to Gross's death aboard the RMS Queen Mary on his way to England in 1958, Pearsall sometimes had to go to New York to take care of her father's American venture, Geographia Map Company. There was conflict in the early 1950s between the two regarding her role in the English company and that of her brother. The head office moved to Sevenoaks, Kent in 1962, but the Gray's Inn Road location in London remained for retail. Three years later, the Geographer's Map Trust was set up. From 1979 to 2007, there was a separate Drawing Office in Lancing, West Sussex.

The A-Z Street Atlas expanded from London to Birmingham in 1953, Manchester in 1963, and was first published in colour in 1985. Given the popularity of the publication, "A-Z" was added to the company name on 15 May 1973. In 1992, the business moved to a new purpose-built office and warehouse in Borough Green, Kent. Tony had died in 1984 and his sister stood down as Chairman in 1996, the same year she died. In 2004, the company shut its London showroom on Gray's Inn Road and, ten years later, the head office returned to Sevenoaks District by moving to Dunton Green.

By the 2010s, the company had started to include licensed brand products including Ben Sherman clothing and Paperchase stationery.

==== Technological developments (1990s-2010s) ====
Unix computers were introduced to the drawing process in 1991, later to be replaced by Windows PCs. Computer-aided design (CAD) and computer-aided manufacturing (CAM) accelerated the pace of map publication. The first electronic street map of London appeared on CD-ROM in 1996. Another five years later, a range of maps were launched for personal digital assistants (PDAs) and mobile phones running Windows Pocket PC. The company launched a London A-Z street map app for smartphones running Symbian in 2005 and for iPhones three years later. In 2006 appeared the first satellite navigation to include A-Z London street maps.

Following a peak in sales during 2005, the significant technological developments in the industry saw the increased availability of free mapping and satellite navigation, and the demand for paper production rapidly declined – ultimately resulting in the company's restructuring in 2013. In the mid-2010s, Geographers' A–Z Map Company was producing digital data used by charities like London's Air Ambulance, public organisations, and private business.

=== Sale to Collins (2019) ===
In 2019, publishing giant HarperCollins bought the A-Z list and rights to publish its mapping brand across all sectors and formats, including digital data.

== Controversy over the role of Phyllis Pearsall ==
The role of Phyllis Pearsall, daughter of Alexander Gross, in the creation of the Geographers' Map Company and its flagship The A-Z Street Atlas has frequently been overstated, from her obituary in the New York Times calling her the "Creator of 'A to Z' London Maps" to a BBC article celebrating her 100^{th} anniversary claiming she created "the first A-Z", completely eliding her father's earlier work. Peter Barber, former Head of Maps at the British Library, disputes these claims given the work her father had already accomplished.

London ephemera collector and researcher Peter Berthoud dates the legend to the late 1980s but was unable to find its source. Pearsall did not claim to be the sole creator of the company and the street atlases either in her autobiographical novel, Fleet Street, Tite Street, Queer Street (1983), privately published with a print run of just 150 copies, or in her autobiography From Bedsitter to Household Name: The Personal Story of A-Z Maps (1990) published by the company. Instead, in her privately distributed autobiographical novel, she writes: "In 1936 to help her father re-establish himself as map publisher in England she founded Geographers’ A-Z Map Company Ltd."

The myth was certainly cemented in a semi-fictionalised biography, Mrs P's Journey: The Remarkable Story of the Woman Who Created the A–Z Map (2001) by Sarah Hartley, which was brought to the stage in 2014 as a musical titled The A–Z of Mrs P. It led Pearsall's half-brother, Alexander Gross Junior, to publish online that same year his own account which he claims is much closer to the truth.

== Special maps ==
=== 2002 Commonwealth Games ===
Geographers' A–Z Map Company produced a special map for the Commonwealth Games held in Manchester.

=== 2012 Olympics ===
Geographers' A–Z Map Company was the official supplier of atlases and maps for the 2012 Olympic Games and 2012 Paralympic Games and produced detailed maps for the Olympic Park in Stratford, as well as all the other venues that were used during the games in London and throughout the United Kingdom. They produced three special maps detailing transport information on getting to the venues and also provided information on events related to the 2012 Cultural Olympiad. In addition, A–Z provided special sections relating to the Games in their 2012 editions of their main UK-wide and local maps.

== Bibliography ==
- Pearsall, Phyllis (1990). From Bedsitter to Household Name: The Personal Story of A-Z Maps. Sevenoaks: Geographers' A-Z Map Co. ISBN 978-0-85039-243-2.
