= Stepney Green Park =

Park in Stepney, Tower Hamlets, London

Coordinates: 51.5179°N 0.0475°W

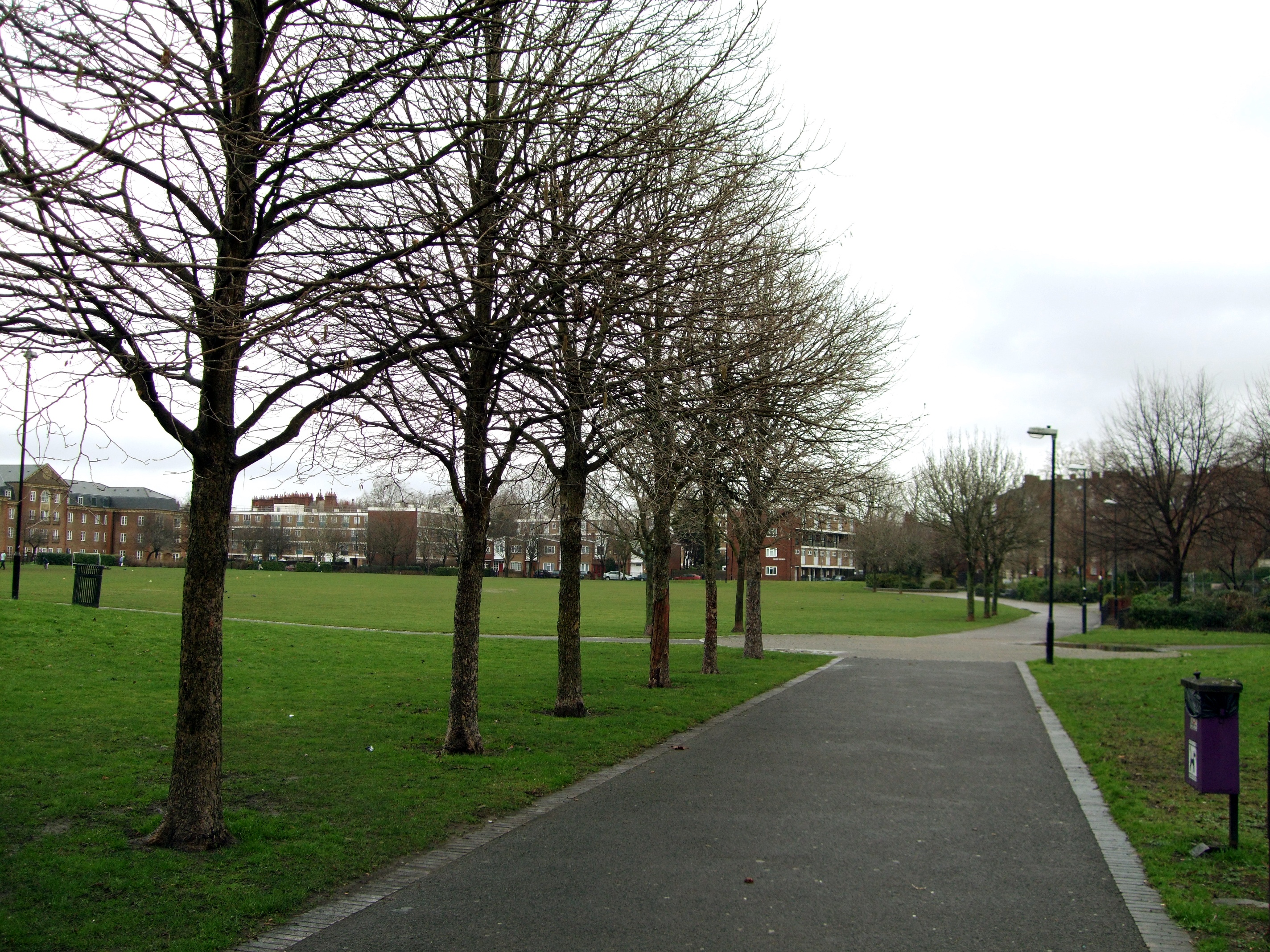
Stepney Green Park, looking north from the Stepney Way entrance

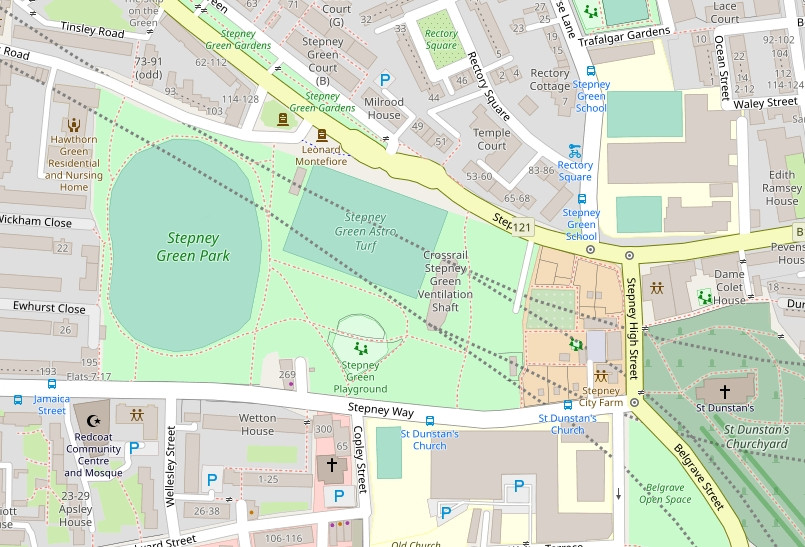
Map of Stepney Green Park

Stepney Green Park is a 4.62-hectare (11.4-acre) park in Stepney, Tower Hamlets, London. It is a remnant of a larger area of common land that was formerly known as Mile End Green.

During the 2010s, a large area of the park was used on a temporary basis to build Crossrail. The Stepney Green cavern is now located below the park.

== See also ==
- Stepney Green tube station
