= Geographia Map Company =

U.S. publisher of road maps

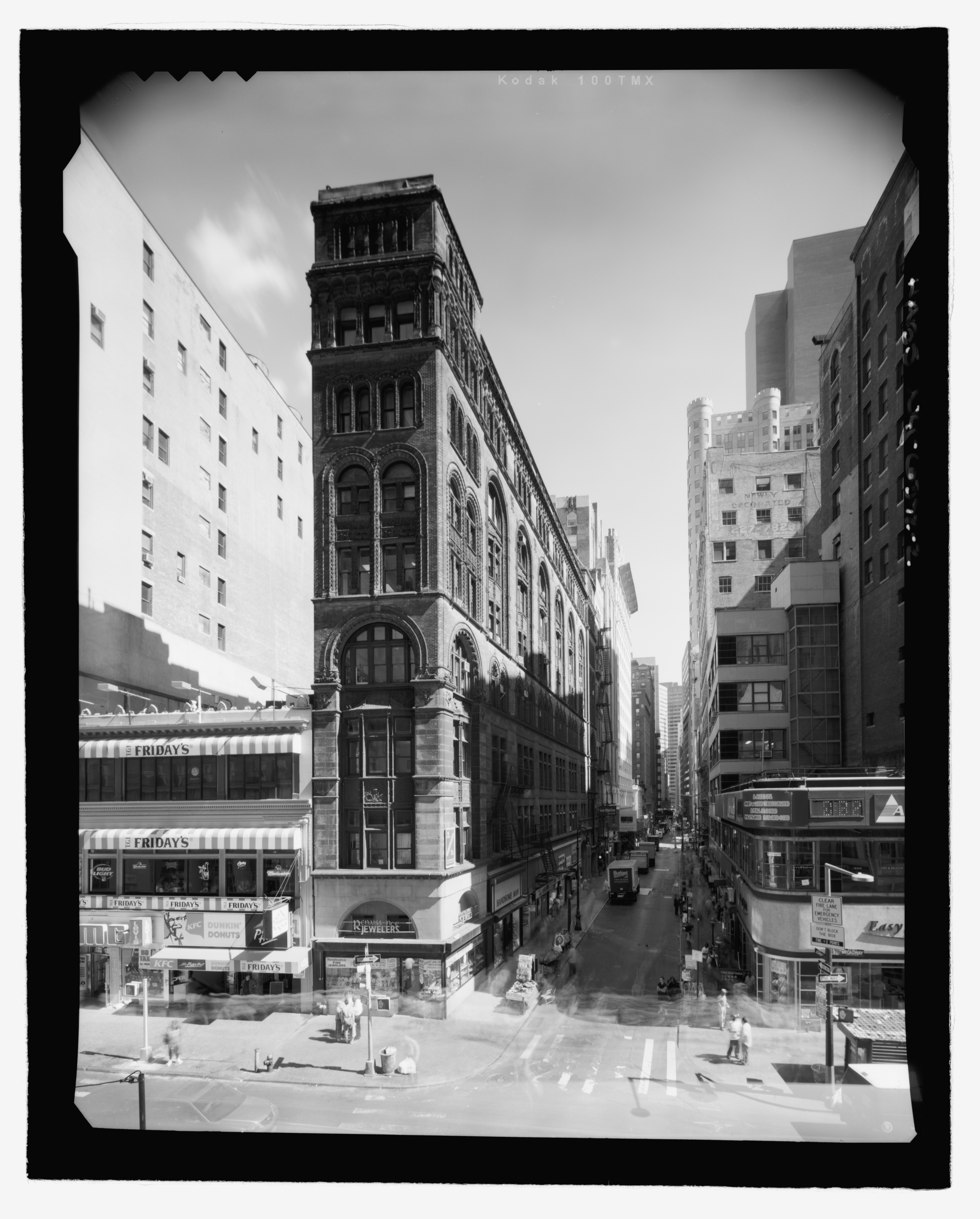
- The Corbin Building in New York City, where the company was headquartered during the mid-20th century.
- Industry: Cartography
- Predecessor: Geographia, Ltd
- Founded: 1908; 118 years ago in London, England
- Founder: Alexander Gross
- Headquarters: Hackensack, New Jersey, United States
- Area served: New York metropolitan area
- Products: Road maps Wall maps
- Website: geographiamaps.com

The Geographia Map Company is an independently owned U.S. publisher of road maps, atlases and wall maps.

After being founded in the early 20th-century by Alexander Gross in London, the company found success through the publishing of World War I maps. After it suffered a post-war collapse, the company met with success once again in mid-century New York City, where Gross published war maps of World War II, along with wall maps, street guide books, travel guides, atlases and street maps of many U.S. cities. Now based in Hackensack, New Jersey, the company has since been under new ownership.

== History ==
=== First success in London (1908–1920) ===
Geographia was founded in London in 1908 by Jewish Hungarian immigrant Alexander Gross (1879 – 23 March, 1958), born Alexander Grosz in Csúrog, Austria-Hungary (now Čurug in Serbia), and his wife Isabelle (Bella) Crowley (1885–1937). Gross had emigrated "both looking for his fortune and to avoid conscription". The couple established Geographia, Ltd, a commercial map publisher, first in an office on John Street, off The Strand. The company moved to No. 55 Fleet Street in 1911. Bella was a Director of Geographia until she started divorce proceedings in 1920.

War maps were in great demand during World War I, so Gross set out to publish as many of these as he could. As his son puts it,

he emerged as one of the few people in England who could not only map Mitteleuropa but actually knew something about the various nations that comprised it and could speak several of its languages.

Among these were maps covering the Gallipoli campaign, Verdun to Belfort, Russia, the Near East, and the Italy—Germany—Austria region. Other wartime efforts included "The Daily Telegraph War Map of the British Front" and "The Daily Telegraph Pocket Atlas of the War." In the war's immediate aftermath, the company produced "The Daily Telegraph Victory Atlas of the World" in forty-eight weekly installments. An index gazetteer which accompanied the victory map contained more than 250,000 place names. Gross provided a full-color 1,200 square inches (0.77 m^{2}) map for the 1917 edition of the South American Year Book.

=== Financial difficulties (1921–1928) ===
Geographia Ltd in London voted to remove Gross from the board and was purchased by the bank in the early 1920s. His son, Alexander Gross Junior (born 1931), lists a few reasons for what he terms "The Great Gross Family Disaster of 1922":

Apparently Papa had been a bit careless in allotting shares of his business to family members and others. Or his associates knowingly swindled him. Or perhaps his wife did him in by voting her shares with those of his enemies. Or it could have been his careless habit of sleeping with too many of his partners' wives. British anti-Semitism is likely to have also played a role.

Having lost everything, the cartographer moved to the United States, met a woman in the main reading room of the New York Public Library in 1923 and followed her to Chicago when she returned to Illinois, where he first taught English. She would give him a son in 1931 to whom he gave his own name, after Gross had briefly returned to London at the end of the 1920s when the liquidation of Geographia Ltd was finally coming to a close.

=== Rebirth in New York (1929–1958) ===
The Geographia name was registered in New York City in 1919, but left dormant. Geographia Map Company, Inc. became active in New York at 11 John Street starting in 1929. Gross initially had the new Geographia produce maps of the New York metropolitan area, and later expanded the company's focus into neighboring urban areas.

In 1936, Gross set up Geographers' Map Company in London and issued the shares equally amongst his two eldest children, whom he had with Bella: Anthony (Tony) Gross (1905–1984) and Phyllis Isobella Pearsall (1906–1996), both recognized artists. In the next two decades, Pearsall would sometimes go to New York to take care of business at Geographia when he father was unable to.

The company entered a period of rapid growth, introducing world maps and atlases, topical maps detailing aspects of World War II, and a catalog of atlases, street guide books ("Red Books"), travel guides ("Famous Guides"), wall maps, and street atlases covering dozens of cities in the United States and Canada. In the 1940s, the New York offices were located in a now vanished building at 145 West 57th Street. The Hudson News Company was a major sales outlet as it distributed publications to the city's countless newsstands and candy stores.

In 1948, Pearsall went to New York to run the U.S. business while her father dealt with visa issues. In 1953, it published the first new map believed to have been made of the Soviet Union in 12 years. In 1958, Alexander Gross died while travelling between New York and England on the RMS Queen Mary. His daughter travelled to New York to put the U.S. business in order before selling it to new owners.

=== New ownership ===
By the late 1980s, the company was owned by the Polak family and sold a million maps per year. Based at 231 Hackensack Plank Road in Weehawken, New Jersey, it was purchased by the Rand McNally Corporation, and then re-purchased by its original owners several years later. Now based in Hackensack, Geographia publishes a number of folded maps, guidebooks, atlases, and wall maps focusing on the greater New York metropolitan area.

== Scope ==
The company's maps are based on information gleaned from various government sources, including official surveys and aerial photographs, but it also relied on tips from average citizens. Gross was known to wander throughout New York City in search of obscure streets to add into his maps.

In addition to its international portfolio, which included maps of London and Paris, by the 1950s Geographia maps had been introduced for Akron, Baltimore, Chicago, Denver, Detroit, New Orleans, San Francisco and Washington (DC). Dozens of other locations were covered, including Buffalo, Cincinnati, Pittsburgh, Rochester, Atlanta, Atlantic City, Binghamton, Birmingham (AL), Charleston (SC), Cleveland, Gary, Grand Rapids, Honolulu, Kansas City, Los Angeles, Louisville, Miami, Montreal, Milwaukee, Minneapolis/St. Paul, Norfolk (VA), Oakland (CA), Oklahoma City, Omaha, Philadelphia, Portland (OR), Providence, Richmond (VA), St. Louis, San Diego, Seattle, Syracuse, Toledo, Toronto and Wilmington (DE).

These folded map titles were housed within a cardstock cover featuring photography of each city's skyline on the front cover, and an alphabetical listing of Geographia's catalog on the rear cover. The maps themselves were large-scale, full color on the detail side, black-and-white on the reverse. Each featured Geographia's characteristic style of cartography, which resembled that of both the forerunner Geographia, Ltd., and the subsequent Geographer's A–Z Street Atlas (also based in the UK). These maps were often distributed by local newsagents, a strategy also employed by a number of Geographia's competitors.

By the end of the 1970s, the vast majority of this catalog had gone out of print, and has since become rather collectible. A handful of titles in the northeastern United States remained in print into the 1990s.
