= Geographers' A–Z Street Atlas =

British atlas

London Geographers' A–Z Street Atlas
- Subject: Street map
- Publisher: Geographers' A–Z Map Company Ltd.
- Publication date: 1936 (first edition)
- Publication place: United Kingdom
- Media type: Print (Paperback)
- Pages: 430 pp (seventh edition)
- ISBN: 978-1-84348-328-1
- OCLC: 80760632

The Geographers' A–Z Street Atlas, commonly shortened to A–Z (pronounced "Ay to Zed"), is a title given to any one of a range of atlases of streets in the United Kingdom formerly produced by Geographers' A–Z Map Company Limited, now published by HarperCollins.

== Dating old maps ==
The cover of the Authentic Map of London of 1957

Until relatively recently, maps produced by the Geographers' (A–Z) Map Company did not include a publication date. It is possible to determine a date range for publication due to the following:

- their first map was published in 1936;
- the only maps produced by them during World War II (1939–1945) were war maps of Europe;
- until his death in 1958, the front cover stated "Produced under the direction of Alexander Gross";
- until 1962, the publication address was "28 Gray's Inn Road, Holborn, London";
- from 1962 to 1992, the publication address was "Sevenoaks, Kent";
- in 1972, the company name was changed from "Geographers' Map Company" to "Geographers' A–Z Map Company";
- from 1992 to 2019, the publication address is "Borough Green, Kent".

=== Date codes ===
On all A–Z maps, there is a three or four letter code in one of the corners, often the one containing the key. These letters represent numbers, which are the cartographic date, in the form (M)MYY. There was at least one scheme used, and perhaps a second.

In one scheme, the letters JIHGFEDCBA represent the digits 1 to 9 and 0, so that HFD would be 357, indicating a publication date of March 1957. This seems to have been used on all the company's folding maps, and possibly also those in book form.

If a second scheme was used, if might have been that of Geographia Map Company, also founded by Alexander Gross. In that case, the letters CUMBERLAND represent the digits 1 to 9 and 0.

== In popular culture ==
The Geographers' A–Z Street Atlas and the story of how Phyllis Pearsall came to write the first edition covering London were featured in a 2005 episode of Nicholas Crane's Map Man TV programme. This revealed that, on all their maps, A–Z print a non-existent trap street so that they can tell if a map has been illegally copied from theirs, a technique used by several publishers of reference works (see fictitious entry).

The story of Pearsall's development of the A–Z also inspired the 2014 musical The A–Z of Mrs P. It reignited a controversy about the extent of her role in the early years of the Geographers' Map Company.

The London A–Z is a plot device in "The Blind Banker", the second episode of the first series of the BBC drama Sherlock when the protagonist is attempting to decipher a book code used by an international smuggling ring based on a book "everybody owns". After attempting to decipher the code using a dictionary and the Bible, Sherlock goes out into Baker Street and appropriates a copy of the A–Z after seeing it being used by a couple of tourists.

Alternative rock band Vampire Weekend mentions using the A-Z to "surf the U.K." in their song "California English" from their 2010 album Contra.

== See also ==
- The A–Z of Mrs P
- Geographers' A–Z Map Company
- Thomas Guide
