= Murdoch Mackenzie (cartographer) =

Scottish hydrographer and cartographer

Murdoch Mackenzie, FRS (1712–1797) was a Scottish hydrographer and cartographer. He is known for his survey of the Orkney Islands: the subsequent maps, known as the Mackenzie Charts are still in use. He is also credited with the invention of the station pointer, a navigational and survey tool used to plot the horizontal angle fixes made with a sextant onto charts.

== Career ==
Born in Orkney and employed by the Royal Navy, he became the first person to accurately chart the coastline around North Ronaldsay where many vessels had come to grief. He created a measured baseline and established station points along the shore to perform the triangulation equations for the survey. His calculations of latitude were very accurate despite the use of primitive methods compared to today. His work led to the construction of a lighthouse at Dennis Head in North Ronaldsay and his charts are still in use by shipping today. Mackenzie's survey of Orkney was featured in a 2005 episode of Map Man, presented by Nicholas Crane. He invented the station pointer, a tool used for surveying landscapes and making maps after his retirement, and once his nephew took over the coastal surveys. The instrument calculated the position of ships in respect to three stationary points on shore. Two crew members on the ship used Hadley's quadrant to determine their location in accordance with the charts. This method was used to navigate shore lines until the 20th century, but remain as a safety precaution in big maritime vessels.

He also surveyed the north coast of Ireland and the west coast of Scotland, publishing the results in "Nautical description of the west coast of Great Britain from Bristol Channel to Cape Wrath" (1776). His 1774 Treatise on Maritime Surveying included the first use of the term station pointer, noting it as a new instrument and method rather than as Mackenzie's invention or tool. It was first used by his nephew, Lieutenant Murdoch Mackenzie, who succeeded his uncle as a surveyor to the Admiralty, and his assistant Graeme Spence in their surveys of the Thames Estuary.

== Personal ==
He was elected a Fellow of the Royal Society in 1774, and withdrew from the society in 1796.

== Death ==
He died in Minehead, Somerset in 1797, and was buried there on 16 October.
