= Mapman =

- Presented by: Nicholas Crane
- Country of origin: United Kingdom
- No. of series: 2

Original release
- Network: BBC Two
- Release: 2004

Map Man is a BBC documentary series first broadcast on BBC Two in 2004 and repeated in 2013. Each episode recounts a particular tale in the history of British cartography, with a particular emphasis on the individuals whose dedication and ingenuity led to the production of some of history's most ground-breaking maps.

The show is presented by explorer and writer Nicholas Crane, each week travelling some distance by bicycle, water or on foot to recreate the often treacherous journeys taken in the creation of that episode's map.

== Series one ==
The first series began on BBC Two on 16 September 2004.

- William Roy's Military Survey of Scotland (1747–53)
- John Ogilby's "Britannia" (1675)
- Harry Beck's London Underground Map (1933)
- The Gough Map (1360s)
- Greenville Collins’ "Coasting Pilot" (1693)
- William Smith's Geological Map of England & Wales (1815)
- Christopher Saxton's Atlas of England & Wales (1577)
- Martin Hotine's Ordnance Survey (1935–1950)

== Series two ==
The second series ran on BBC Two from 5 September 2005.

- Bartholomew's Cycling Map of England and Wales (1896-1903)
- Timothy Pont's Maps of Scotland (c1583)
- Murdoch Mackenzie's Chart of the Orkney Islands (1748)
- John Speed's "Theatre of the Empire of Great Britaine" (1611–12)
- John Cary's "Inland Navigation" (1796)
- William Mudge's Ordnance Survey, 1st Edition, (1809)
- Mrs P's A-Z (1936)
- Thomas Raven's "Clandeboye Estate Maps", Ireland (1625–26)
