= Town with Nicholas Crane =

- Genre: Documentary
- Created by: Tern Television
- Presented by: Nicholas Crane
- Country of origin: United Kingdom
- Original language: English
- No. of series: 2
- No. of episodes: 8

Production
- Executive producer: Sam Anthony
- Producer: Ishbel Hall
- Running time: 60 minutes
- Production company: Tern Television

Original release
- Network: BBC Two
- Release: 28 July 2011 – 11 June 2013

Related
- Coast

Town with Nicholas Crane is a BBC documentary series produced by Tern TV and first broadcast on BBC Two from 28 July 2011 to 11 June 2013. It covers various subjects about the history and development of towns in the United Kingdom. The series is presented by geographer Nicholas Crane.

Each four-part series covers one town per hour-long episode, and documents the benefits of life in a town as compared with a larger city.

== Episodes ==
=== Series 1 ===
Episode	Title	Original airdate	Summary
1	"Ludlow"	28 July 2011	The Shropshire town of Ludlow and the many treasures there.
2	"Scarborough"	4 August 2011	The Yorkshire town of Scarborough. He investigates the highs and lows of the holiday town.
3	"Perth"	11 August 2011	The Scottish town of Perth. He explains how the town wants to become a city, and visits its celebration of 800 years as a royal burgh.
4	"Totnes"	18 August 2011	The town of Totnes in Devon, a transition town.

=== Series 2 ===
Episode	Title	Original airdate	Summary
1	"Oban"	21 May 2013	Oban, "a bustling ferry port clinging to the western side of Scotland that most people pass by with barely a sideways glance".
2	"Saffron Walden"	28 May 2013	Saffron Walden, Essex.
3	"Huddersfield"	4 June 2013	The West Yorkshire town of Huddersfield.
4	"Enniskillen"	11 June 2013	The lakeside Northern Ireland town of Enniskillen.
