= Stepney Green cavern =

Underground junction where Crossrail splits into two branches

Coordinates: 51.517°N 0.044°W

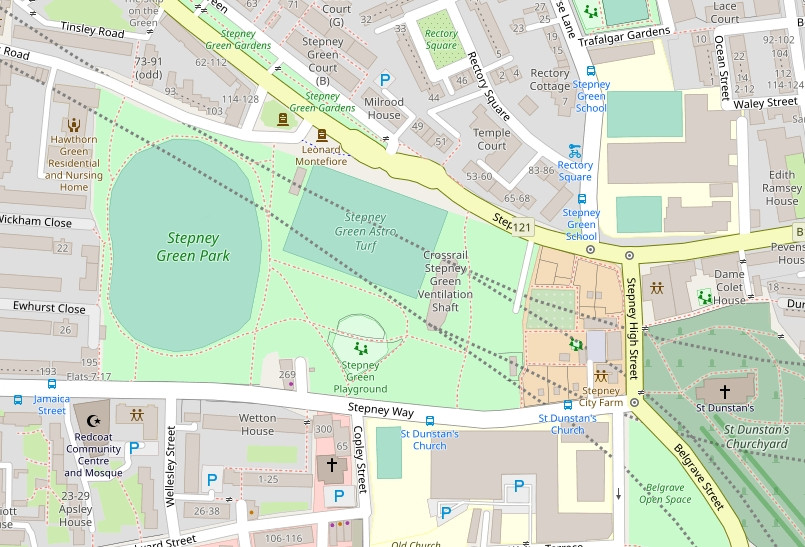
Map of Stepney Green Park, showing Crossrail tunnel junctions

Stepney Green cavern is an underground space which contains the junction where Crossrail divides into two branches: one to Shenfield and one to Abbey Wood. It is located below Stepney Green Park.

Construction began in March 2011. The cavern was built using spray concrete lining techniques. Excavation work was completed in 2013, with all major work completed in 2017. At the time of its completion, Stepney Green cavern was claimed to have been one of the largest mined caverns in Europe.

Stepney Green Park above the caverns was subsequently restored following construction.

== History ==
Construction of the Crossrail project begun shortly after the Crossrail Act 2008 received royal assent during July 2008. In addition to forming one element of the central underground section of the new railway, Stepney Green accommodated a critical junction, requiring care in its design. It was designed by Mott MacDonald.

The engineering of Stepney Green cavern involved overcoming several challenges, as it was one of the largest excavated caverns to be constructed in Europe. Its maximum dimensions are a width 13.4 metres (44 ft), a height of 16.6 metres (54 ft), and a length of 50 metres (160 ft). Following an evaluation of various techniques, it was decided to use a tunnelling technique known as spray concrete lining, which involved the excavation and removal of 7,500 m^{3} (9,800 cu yd) of subsoil along with the application of 2,500 m^{3} (3,300 cu yd) of shotcrete to support the walls. Due to the presence of highly permeable water-bearing sand that posed a hazard during the shotcrete application, depressurisation measures were employed. The boring process was largely performed via multiple TBMs.

Various measures were taken to support the construction effort. To supply the large quantities of concrete needed, a purpose-built batching plant was constructed to manufacture it on site. A variety of sensors were installed in the vicinity of the cavern to closely monitor any instances of ground movement, vigorous measuring of the applied concrete's strength was also practiced. Furthermore, a specialised cutting tool was used to remove the temporary supports, which generated far less noise than conventional impact hammers. Primary access to the site was via a rectangular access shaft that is located across the twin running tunnels just to the west of the junctions; this space also accommodates various utility spaces, including a ventilation facility, as well as providing an emergency access point.

=== Construction ===
The contract to build tunnels from Limmo Peninsula to Farringdon and Pudding Mill Lane (including Stepney Green cavern) was awarded to a joint venture of Dragados and Sisk Group in December 2010.

During March 2011, shortly after being awarded the contract to construct the section, the contractor took possession of the site; initial activity centred around the excavation of the first large access and operations shaft. During May 2013, the eastbound section of the cavern was completed ahead of schedule; completion of the westbound section was achieved in August 2013. The first breakthrough of a TBM into the cavern was achieved during the latter half of 2013.

During June 2014, it was announced that one of the TBMs had finished its boring activity at Stepney Green; the occasion also marked the structural completion of all tunnels of the line's north east spur. Upon arriving at Stepney Green, the TBMs were disassembled and removed in pieces, before being reassembled elsewhere to work on additional Crossrail elements. During October 2017, Crossrail announced the completion of all work associated with Stepney Green cavern, which was stated to be a major milestone of the overall scheme. A shaft building - allowing ventilation of the tunnels and access for the emergency services - was built on the part of the site.

Stepney Green Park above the caverns was subsequently restored, with work completing in 2019.
