= Ten Alps =

UK-based production group

Zinc Media Group Plc
- Type: Public Limited Company
- Industry: Media
- Founded: 1999
- Headquarters: UK
- Key people: Mark Browning (CEO & president)
- Number of employees: 283
- Divisions: Zinc Distribution
- Subsidiaries: Atomic Television; Brook Lapping; The Edge Picture Company; Electric Violet; Red Sauce; Rex; Raw Cut TV; Supercollider; Tomos TV
- Website: www.zincmedia.com

Zinc Media Group Plc (LSE: ZIN) (formerly known as Ten Alps Plc) is a British multimedia production & distribution company that creates factual documentary, unscripted television series and cross-platform content for UK and international broadcasters, brands, and businesses. It operates through two main segments: Television Production, which includes labels like Brook Lapping - which produces current affairs programming such as Dispatches and Tern TV, and Content Production, which creates films, podcasts, and other content for brands, the company has its own distribution arm named Zinc Distribution that handles global distribution of programming produced by its own production labels. It also produced films, branded content, digital content, podcasts, and publishing content for businesses, worldwide brands and rights holders.

Ten Alps Communicate manages a digital cross-platform portfolio which includes major programmes such as Transport for London's Children's Traffic Club, and educational websites, apps and channels for Siemens, Nationwide, BMW, AstraZeneca, and other major organisations.

Ten Alps Publishing is structured around specialised business-to-business audiences with a focus on finance, small businesses, health, pharmaceuticals, logistics and farming niches.

== History ==
Zinc Media was founded in 1999 as Ten Alps by Alex Connock, Bob Geldof and Des Shaw. For £1 they bought Planet 24 Radio, a subsidiary of Geldof's previous TV production company Planet 24, producer of The Big Breakfast and The Word, when Planet 24 TV was sold to ITV subsidiary Carlton TV. The name Ten Alps derives from Planet, spelt backwards. The first production was award-winning current affairs radio programme Sunday Service for BBC Radio 5 Live. Ten Alps listed on the AIM in 2001.

On 17 June 2015, Ten Alps completed its major recapitalisation and had brought London-based factual television production company Reef Television to expand its factual production business, giving Ten Alps another production company with Reed Television became a subsidiary of the former group as Reef Television founder & chief executive Richard Farmbrough continued leading the London-based factual production company and became Ten Alps' new commercial director whilst Ten Alps' creative director Fiona Stourton retained her position of the group's television operations. Ten Alps' co-founder & musician Bob Geldof stepping down as board of the TV & media production group Ten Alps following the production group's major restructuring alongside Timothy Hoare with the group's president & CEO Peter Bertram remained as CEO of the production group as Entertaineur Jonathan Goodwin and former Channel 4 chairman Luke Johnson joined Ten Alps as non-executive directors however Bob Geldof retained a shareholder in the production group.

On 29 February 2016 following Ten Alps' major restructure of its leader board and the acquisition of Reef Television one year prior in 2015, Ten Alps had been rebranded themselves to Zinc Media with its portfolio of its production companies including Blakeway Productions and Brook Lapping retained its names and adapted Zinc Media's rebranding as Zinc Media launched its new website which became effective.

On October 25 2017 following the rebranding of Ten Alps to Zinc Media a year prior, Zinc Media acquired Scottish & Northern Irish indie production company Tern TV to expand Zinc Media's factual production operations, giving Zinc Media its own Scottish & Northern Irish production outfit and its entry into the Scotland and Northern Ireland markets as Tern TV became a subaidary of Zinc Media.

In September 2020, Zinc Media Group increased its factual entertainment & factual businesses by establishing a new factual entertainment subsidiary based in London named Red Sauce that would produce factual entertainment & factual programming and would partner with Zinc's Branded Content division with former BBC commissioner editor and diversity executive Tom Edwards heading Zinc Media's new factual entertainment label as president. A day later in that same month following Zinc's launch of factual entertainment label Red Sauce, Zinc Media Group shuttered two of its production companies which are Manchester-based production company Blakeway North and London-based production subsidiary Reef Television as Zinc's new factual entertainment unit Red Sauce would take over production of factual programmies from both Zinc's former companies.

In April 2021, Zinc Media Group joined forces with award-winning director Mike Christie to launch a new production label dedicated to live-event music, arts & sports broadcasts, factual content, brand fimms and exhilarating documentaries called Supercollider as Zinc Media's sixth production subsidiary with the award-winning director heading the new production label Supercollider as its president of the new production subsidiary.

In August 2022, Zinc Media Group expanded its international production output with the acquisition of global award-winning British and Middle East-based international film production company The Edge Picture Company and its international offices based in both former countries and in Vancouver, Canada and Paris, France. A month later in September of that year, Zinc Media Group entered the post-production activities with the establishment of its post-production service based in London called Bumblebee that would handle post-production services for programmes produced by Zinc's production companies and would work on various cilents.

In October 2024, Zinc Media Group brought factual independent production and distribution group behind the series Police Interceptors Raw Cut TV alongside its London-based distributiom arm Raw Cut Distribution and Cardiff-based Welsh production subsidiary Tomos TV. Zinc's acquisition of Raw Cut TV alongside its distribution arm Raw Cut Distribution and Cardiff-based Welsh outfit Tomos TV had marked Zinc's first entry into the Welsh production genre and gained Zinc an international distribution unit that would bring programming from Zinc's production companies to other markets.

In October 2025 ahead of MIPCOM and following Zinc's acquisition of Raw Cut TV including its distribution unit Raw Cut Distribution back in 2024, Zinc Media Group announced its entry into the distribution operations with the launch of its in-house distribution division named Zinc Distribution that would bring all of programming & back catalogue produced by Zinc's production companies under one distribution arm as Raw Cut TV's founder & president Steve Warr became head of Zinc's distribution arm Zinc Distribution.

== Group companies ==
=== Red Sauce ===
Red Sauce is the factual entertainment and digital content label of Zinc Media Group that produce factual entertainment programming.

In May 2022, Red Sauce announced its three executives across the company's development and production.

==== Filmography ====
Title	Years	Network	Notes
Bargain-Loving Brits in the Sun	2016–present	5	continued from Blakeway North
Legends of Comedy with Lenny Henry	2024–present	Channel 4	co-production with Douglas Road Productions

=== Tern Television ===
Tern Television is a Scottish multi-award-winning, independent television production subsidiary of Zinc Media Group that produces factual, documentary, and specialist television series.

In late-September 2006 following Tern Television's successful Irish television series The Greenmount Garden, Tern Television expanded its production operations into Northern Ireland by establishing a new production office based in Belfast with former BBC producer Alison Millar heading Tern Television new Irish production office.

In October 2007, Tern Television further expanded its production services into the multimedia platform operations with the launch of its own multimedia platform division Tern Digital as the new division would handle Tern Television's content into multi-platform services with Tern Television appointing former IWC Media development producer Simon Meek to head the production company's new mulimedia platform division as CEO of the new unit.

==== Productions ====
Title	Years	Network	Notes
Beechgrove	1978–present	BBC One/BBC Two/BBC Scotland	
Ladies That Launch	2005	Discovery Home & Health	
Sunday Morning Live	2010–present	BBC One	inherited from BBC Studios co-production with Green Inc.
Town with Nicholas Crane	2011–2013	BBC Two	
Emergency Helicopter Medics	2018–present	Channel 4	co-production with GroupM Motion Entertainment
Inside the Zoo	2020–present	BBC Scotland	
Spooked Ireland	2023	Really	
Our Tiny Islands	2024	More 4	co-production with Northern Ireland Screen
Jailed: Women In Prison	2025	BBC Scotland	
