= Wallasea Wetlands =

Salt marsh in Essex

Coordinates: 51.6144°N 0.8542°E

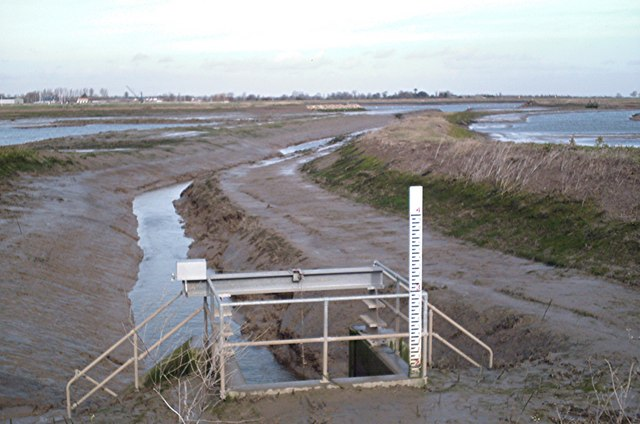
Wallasea Wetlands' relocated seawall in 2007, shortly after the initial stage of the scheme was finished

Wallasea Wetlands is a reclaimed wetlands area located in Essex, England. It has been created as part of a government-funded wetlands scheme to halt the decline of wild and endangered birds caused by the drainage and development of former wetland sites. It is the largest man-made marine wetland area in the United Kingdom.

The wetland spans an area of 115 hectares (1.15 km^{2}) and is sited on Wallasea Island, which borders two rivers (River Crouch to the north and River Roach to the south-east). They provide winter grounds for wading birds, as well as breeding and nursery areas for aquatic wildlife, such as bass, mullet, flatfish and herring and even some types of dolphin. The area will also help to reduce the flooding of properties near the River Crouch by providing a run-off area for floodwaters.

In the process being termed "managed re-alignment", the seawall that protects croplands and property was re-established in more tenable positions, three miles behind the new wetlands, which will provide habitat for birds like oystercatchers, avocets and little terns, according to the press release issued at the time.

Walkers and birdwatchers will be able to enjoy the scenery by means of a new footpath that has been built on the top of this new relocated sea wall. Construction was completed in 2006 and by 2011 the land had evolved into wetland, mudflats, saline lagoons and seven artificial islands, allowing the wildlife to reside on these areas.

An extension to the scheme, using 2,400 shiploads of spoil excavated from London's Crossrail tunnels, was completed in July 2015, when an additional area of land was opened to tidal flow. This formed the Jubilee Marsh (160 ha / 400 acres), a nature reserve managed by the RSPB. The whole project was completed in 2025.

== History ==
Wetlands have existed on Wallasea Island since ancient times, when much of the Essex coastline was bordered by rich breeding grounds for birds. In the 15th century these lands were drained by Dutch settlers for agricultural use with the construction of the original sea wall. Over time more wetland areas were drained for development, leading to the reduction and endangerment of the wildlife that depended on it.

During the late 1980s and early 1990s two areas of salt marsh and mud flat at Lappel Bank in the Medway Estuary in Kent and Fagbury Flats in the Orwell Estuary in Suffolk (both on the east coast of England) were drained and port developments at Sheerness and Felixstowe were built in their place. The European Court of Justice ruled that under the European Birds Directive these wetlands had to be replaced, and it was decided that new wetlands should be created. The following criteria for Wallasea Wetlands has been met in accordance with this ruling:

- they will complement and uphold existing coastal strategies and not impact on other local environmentally sensitive sites
- they will create an attractive, sustainable site for the bird population that has been displaced over a 50- to 70-year period
- they will provide additional flood and storm protection for the area
- they will create an attractive environment for local people that would not impact negatively on existing business or leisure activities

In 2005, the £7.5million project to return the island to its original salt marsh was commenced, beginning with the construction of the new sea defence wall, defining the area where the tides were permitted to flood. Work was completed on 4 July 2006, when 300m of the original sea wall were bulldozed, allowing sea tides to flood the area at high tide.
