= Phyllis Pearsall =

British cartographer and typographer

Phyllis Pearsall MBE
- Born: Phyllis Isobella Gross; 25 September 1906; Court Lane Gardens, Dulwich Village, London, England
- Died: 28 August 1996 (aged 89); Shoreham-by-Sea, West Sussex, England
- Occupations: Artist, writer and publisher
- Known for: Geographers' A–Z Map Company
- Spouse(s): Richard Pearsall (m. 1927–1935)

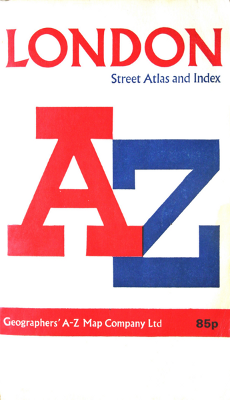
Cover of the London A–Z street atlas, produced by Phyllis Pearsall

Phyllis Isobella Pearsall (25 September 1906 – 28 August 1996) was a British painter, publisher, artist and writer who founded the Geographers' A–Z Map Company, for which she is regarded as one of the most successful business people of the twentieth century. She has erroneously been credited with creating London's first popular indexed street map.

== Early life and education ==
She was born Phyllis Isobella Gross in East Dulwich, London on 25 September 1906. Her father, Alexander Gross (originally Grosz), was a Hungarian-Jewish immigrant and her mother, Isabella Crowly, an Irish-Italian Roman Catholic suffragette, whose parents disapproved of the match. Phyllis Gross was baptised a Roman Catholic.

She grew up with her older brother, the artist Anthony Gross, in London and travelled all over Europe from an early age. Her father founded the cartographic company Geographia Ltd, which produced, among others, street maps of most British towns and although successful, eventually went bankrupt; Gross relaunched the company in the United States as the Geographia Map Company a few years later.

Phyllis Gross was educated at Roedean School, a private boarding school near Brighton, which she had to leave when her father went bankrupt. She then became an English tutor in France, at a small school in Fécamp, Normandy. Later, she studied at the Sorbonne, spending her first few months in Paris sleeping rough before moving to a bedsit where she met the writer Vladimir Nabokov. She started working as a shop assistant in a big department store, selling gloves.

She married Richard Pearsall, an artist friend of her brother. They were together for eight years, travelling in Spain and living in Paris. She did not remarry.

== Start of mapping ==
By 1935, Pearsall had become a portrait painter but became lost in London while using the latest map she could find, which was 17 years old. This stimulated her to produce a new map to cover the rapidly expanding area of London, including places of interest such as museums, bus routes etc.

Pearsall claimed that the work involved walking 3,000 miles to check the names of the 23,000 streets of London, waking up at 5am every day, and not going to bed until after an 18-hour working day. In her autobiography she points to one novelty: "House numbers along main roads; I've walked them from start to finish; you won't find them on any other London map." It is often claimed to be the first indexed London street map, but this claim is easily refuted by reference to Bartholomew's Reference Atlas of London and Suburbs, which was published and widely available from 1908 onwards. The first Pearsall A–Z claimed on its front cover to include "9,000 more [streets] than any similar atlas index", but in fact it had almost the same number of streets as the Bartholomew's version.

The map was drawn using the 72 6" Ordnance Survey maps for London dating from 1919 by her father's cartographer, Mr Fountain, updated by visits to the LCC planning offices. In 1936, when her map was complete, she printed 10,000 copies and began contacting bookstores who might sell it. She tried Hatchards in Piccadilly, Selfridges, where they would not see her without an appointment, and Foyles. None of them would take it. Next she went to W H Smith where, after being snubbed for days by an office junior, she received an order for 1,250 copies, which she delivered using a hand barrow borrowed from the pub next door. They sold well and within weeks she was taking regular orders to every main railway station in London. F. W. Woolworth took a few thousand copies too. By 1938 the London A–Z was well-established. Until her father's death in 1958, all copies included the words "Produced under the direction of Alexander Gross, F.R.G.S."; he was not actually involved but it was hoped that he would find the acknowledgement useful. Compact and convenient maps of cities have a history which goes back centuries, but Pearsall's A to Z map was a marketing success in its clean, simple and efficient design and cover.

During the Second World War, when selling maps to the public was forbidden, she worked for the Ministry of Information. There was also limited production of maps of the war fronts, but this was a hard time for her fledgling company.

In 1945, returning from a trip to Amsterdam where they were printing a new edition of the London map to get round shortages of paper in England, she was involved in a plane crash which left her with permanent scars.

== Later years ==
In 1966, she turned her company, the Geographers' A–Z Map Co, into a trust to ensure that it was never bought out. This secured the future of her company and its employees.

She wrote about her early days in From Bedsitter to Household Name, published by her own company. She was awarded an MBE in The Queen's Birthday Honours of 1986. She was involved with the company she founded, as well as painting prolifically, until her death.

In her later years, she lived in Shoreham-by-Sea, West Sussex, and died of cancer on 28 August 1996, at age 89.

== Legacy ==
BBC Radio 4 broadcast in 2000 a dramatisation by Lucy Catherine of Phyllis Pearsall's life in 1936. A biography, Mrs P’s Journey by Sarah Hartley, was published in 2001.

In 2005 Southwark Council placed a blue plaque on the house where she was born in Court Lane Gardens, Dulwich.

In 2012 Crossrail named one of its first pair of tunnel boring machines (TBMs) Phyllis to honour Pearsall's memory. The other machine was named Ada, after Ada Lovelace.

In 2014 a musical about Phyllis Pearsall, The A–Z of Mrs P, written by Diane Samuels and Gwyneth Herbert, was performed at Southwark Playhouse.

== See also ==
- The A–Z of Mrs P
- Geographers' A–Z Map Company

== Bibliography ==
- Hartley, Sarah (2002). Mrs P's Journey: The Remarkable Story of the Woman Who Created the A–Z Map. Pocket Books. ISBN 0-7434-0876-4.
- Pearsall, Phyllis (1990). A to Z Maps: The Personal Story — From Bedsitter to Household Name. Geographers' A–Z Map Co Ltd. ISBN 0-85039-243-8.
- Hartley, Sarah (2001). Mrs P's Journey. Simon & Schuster.
