= Nicholas Crane =

British geographer, explorer, broadcaster and author

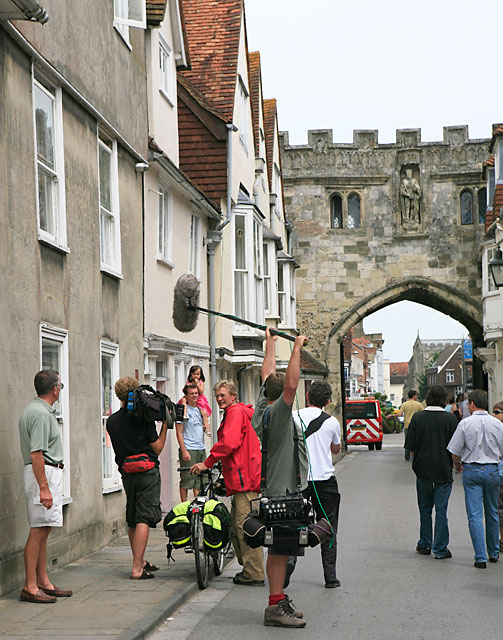
- Crane (in red coat, with bicycle) filming in Salisbury, 2006
- Born: 6 May 1954 (age 72); Hastings, East Sussex, England
- Education: Cambridgeshire College of Arts and Technology
- Occupations: Geographer explorer broadcaster
- Writing career
- Subject: Travel

Nicholas Crane (born 6 May 1954) is an English geographer, explorer, writer and broadcaster. Since 2004, he has written and presented four television series for BBC Two: Coast, Great British Journeys, Map Man and Town.

== Early life and education ==
Crane was born in Hastings, East Sussex, but grew up in Norfolk. He attended Wymondham College from 1967 until 1972, then Cambridgeshire College of Arts and Technology (CCAT), a forerunner to Anglia Ruskin University, where he studied Geography.

In his youth, he went camping and hiking with his father and explored Norfolk by bicycle, which gave him his enthusiasm for exploration.

== Career ==
In 1986, while travelling with his cousin Richard, he located the pole of inaccessibility for the Eurasia landmass; their journey became the subject of the book Journey to the Centre of the Earth. In 1992–93, he embarked on an 18-month solo journey, walking 10,000 kilometres from Cape Finisterre to Istanbul. He recounted the trip in his book Clear Waters Rising: A Mountain Walk Across Europe, which won the Thomas Cook Travel Book Award in 1997, and made a television self-documentary of the journey: High Trails to Istanbul (1994).

His 2000 book Two Degrees West described his walk across Great Britain from north to south, in which he followed the eponymous meridian as closely as possible. In 2003, he published a biography of Gerard Mercator, the great Flemish cartographer.

Together with Richard Crane, he was awarded the 1992 Mungo Park Medal by the Royal Scottish Geographical Society for his journeys in Tibet, China, Afghanistan and Africa.

In 2007, he completed a series called Great British Journeys. In eight parts, the series consisted of eight people who explored Great Britain and made a contribution to society born of the exploration. Each episode lasts one hour and the series was accompanied by a book.

In November 2007, he debated the future of the English countryside with Richard Girling, Sue Clifford, Richard Mabey and Bill Bryson as part of CPRE's annual Volunteers Conference.

Crane presented a series about British towns broadcast in August 2011 and May–June 2013.

He has served as a visiting professor at Anglia Ruskin University, which presented the former student in 2012 with the award of Honorary Doctor of Science.

He was President of the Royal Geographical Society from 2015 to 2018, a post now occupied by Nigel Clifford.

In 2016, Crane published The Making Of The British Landscape: From the Ice Age to the Present, a 12,000-year historical geography of Britain.

== Personal life ==
Crane lives in Primrose Hill in northwest London with his wife; they have three children.

== Books ==
- The CTC Route Guide to Cycling in Britain and Ireland (with Christa Gausden, 1980)
- Cycling Guide (Tantivy Press, annually 1980–86)
- Cycling in Europe (1984)
- Bicycles Up Kilimanjaro (with Richard Crane, 1985)
- Journey to the Centre of the Earth (with Richard Crane, 1987)
- Richard's Mountain Bike Book (with Charles Kelly, edited by Richard Ballantine, 1988)
- Nick Crane's Action Sports (1989)
- Atlas Biker: Cycling in Morocco. O.U.P. (1990)
- Clear Waters Rising: A Mountain Walk Across Europe (1996)
- Two Degrees West: An English Journey (2000)
- Mercator: The Man Who Mapped the Planet (2003)
- Great British Journeys (2007)
- Coast A Journey around our Shores (2010)
- The Making Of The British Landscape: From the Ice Age to the Present (2016)
- Latitude: The Astonishing Adventure That Shaped the World (2021)

== Television ==
- Now Get Out of That – as a contestant representing Oxford, 1982
- High Trails to Istanbul (1994)
- Map Man (8x30m, 2004 and 8x30m, 2005)
- Coast (as main presenter, 13x60m, 2005; as regular contributor 2006–present)
- Great British Journeys (8x60m, 2007)
- Beeching's Tracks – featured presenter of Episode 1 East. Broadcast 13 November 2008 on BBC Four
- Nicholas Crane's Britannia: The Great Elizabethan Journey (3x60m, 2009)
- In Search of England’s Green and Pleasant Land: East (30m, 2009) Broadcast 5 June 2009 on BBC Four
- Munro: Mountain Man (60m, 2009) Broadcast 20 September on BBC Four
- TOWN with Nicholas Crane (4x60m, 2011 and 4x60m, 2013)
