= Anthony Gross =

British printmaker (1905-1984)

Anthony Gross CBE RA
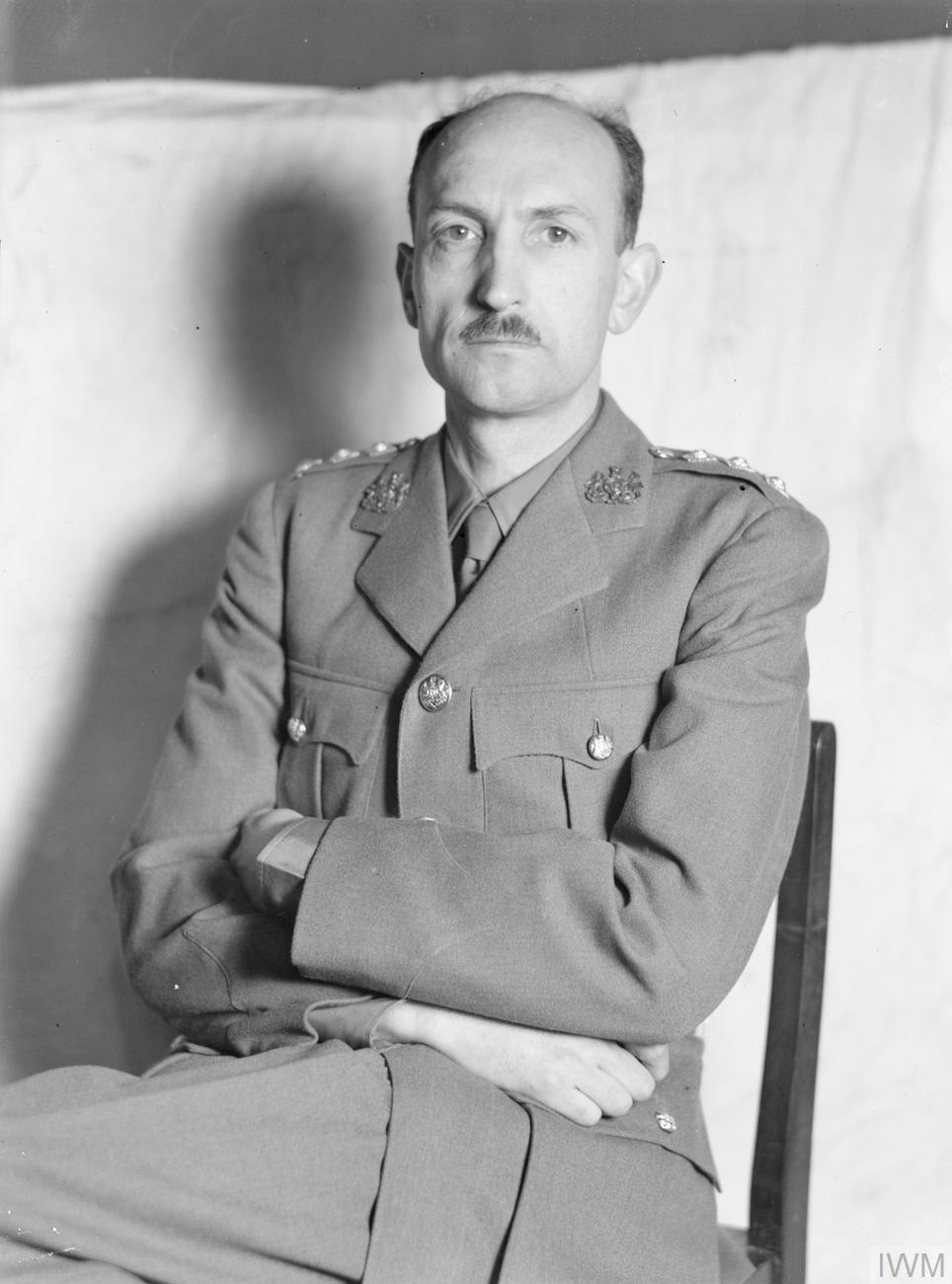
- Captain Anthony Gross, an Official War Artist
- Born: Anthony Imre Alexander Gross; 19 March 1905; Dulwich, London, England
- Died: 8 September 1984 (aged 79); Le Boulvé, France
- Education: Slade School of Fine Art, Central School of Art and Crafts, École des Beaux-Arts, Academia de San Fernando, Académie Julian
- Known for: printmaking, engraving, etching, painting, animation
- Spouse(s): Marguerite Florenty (m. 1930–1984, his death); 2 children
- Military career
- Allegiance: United Kingdom
- Branch: British Army
- Service years: 1941–1945
- Rank: Captain
- Unit: 9th Army

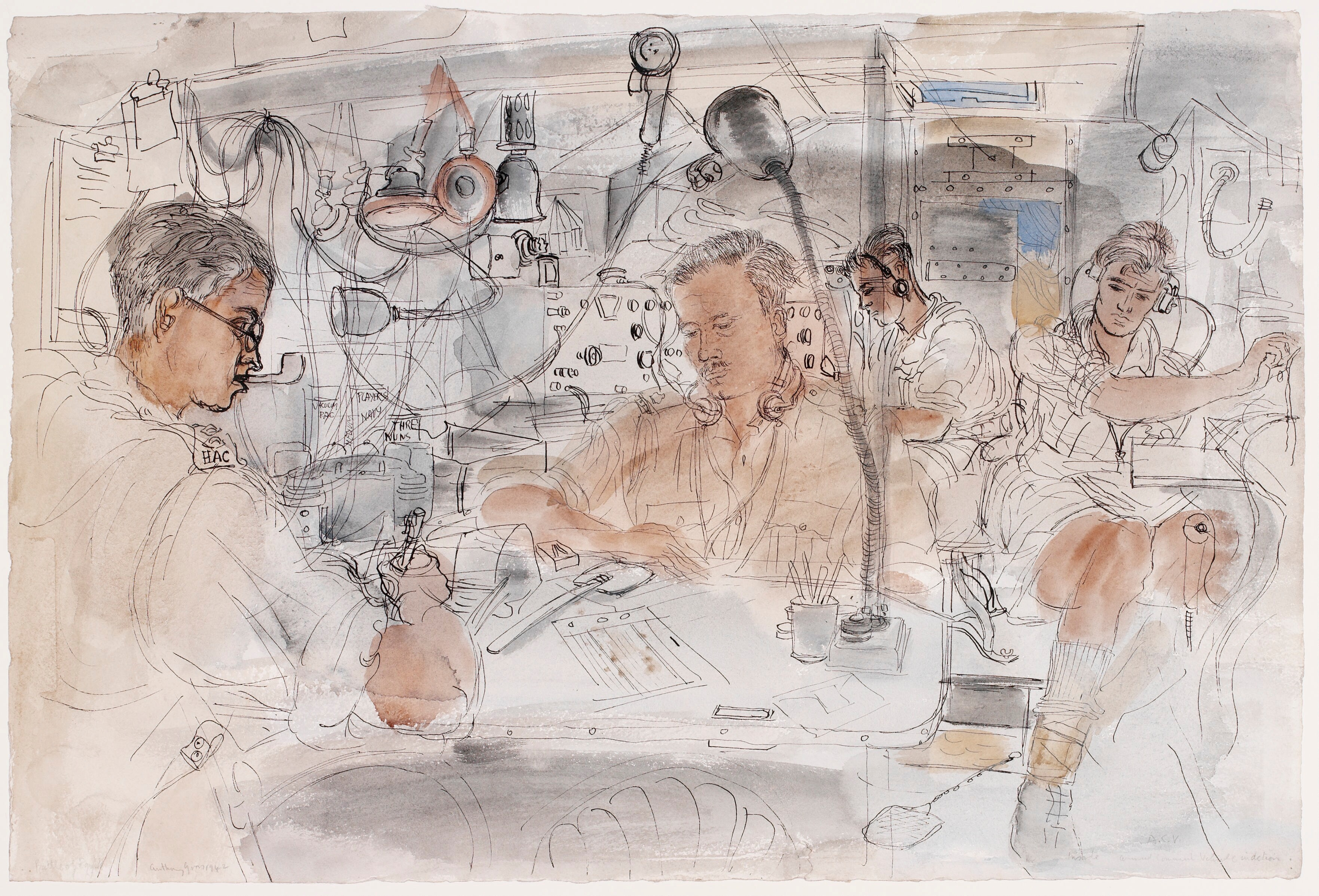
The Battle of Egypt, 1942- Inside an Armoured Command Vehicle in Action (1942)

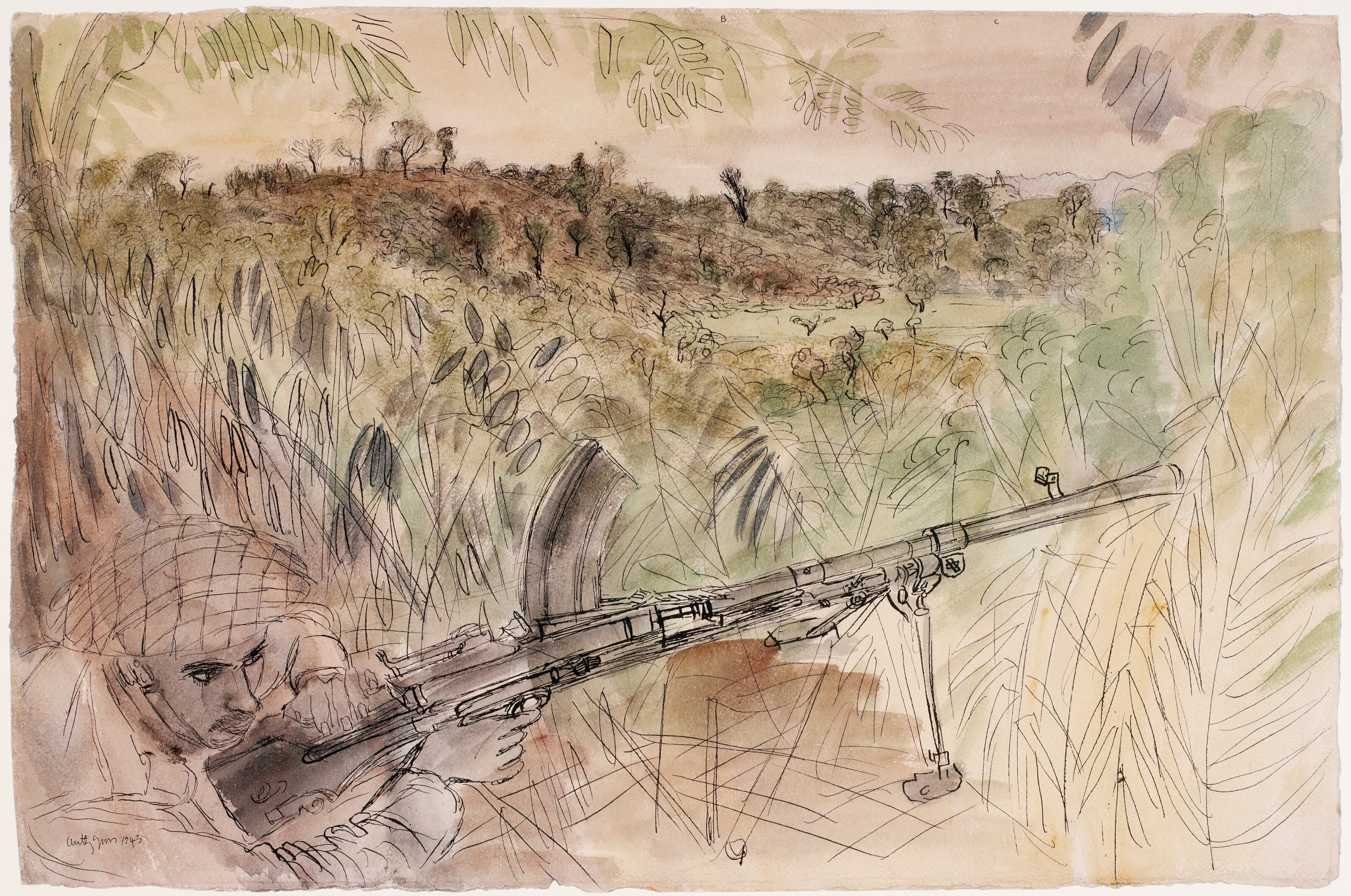
Battle of Arakan, 1943- Overlooking Japanese Positions at Rathedaung (1943)

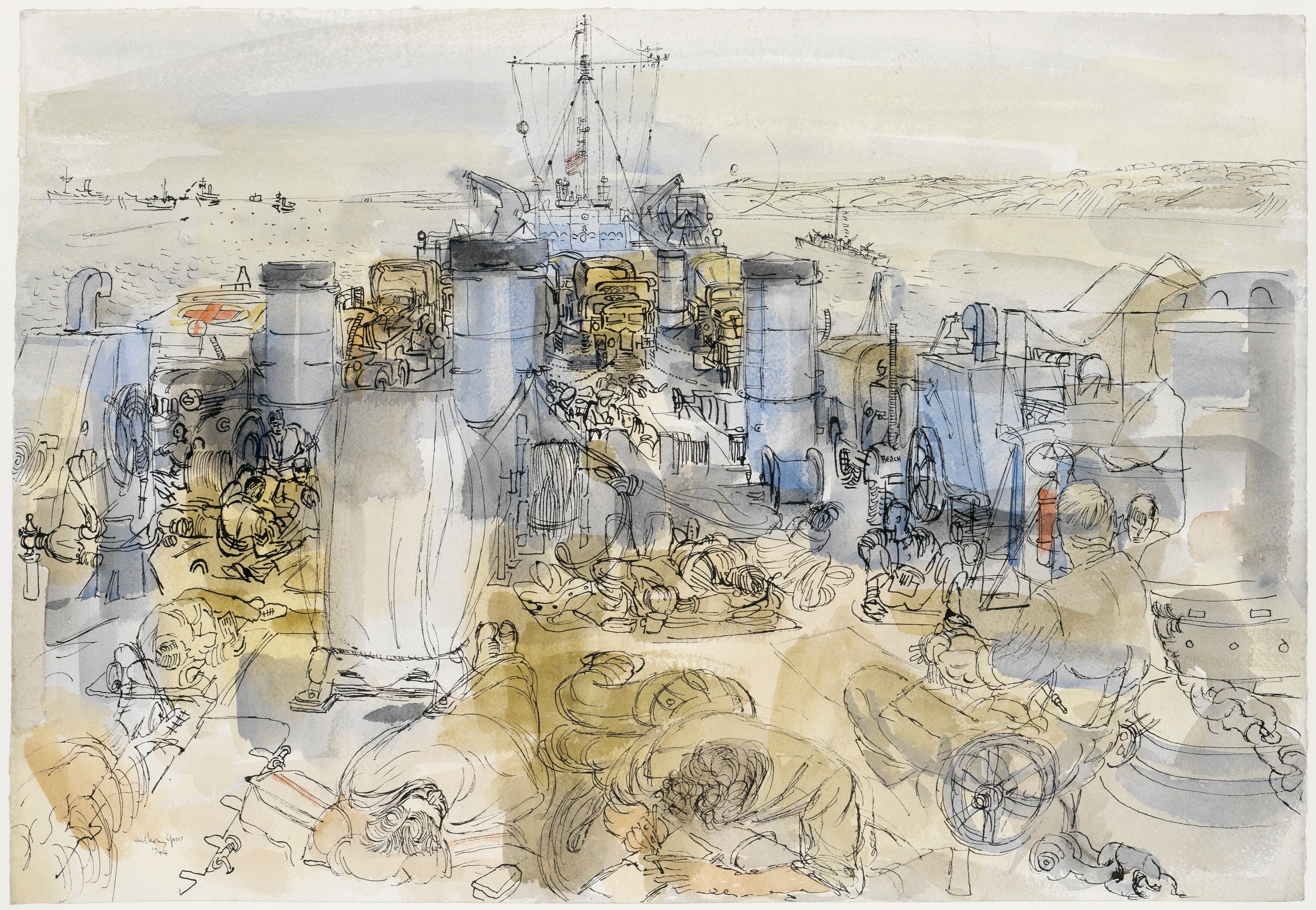
British Troops and Vehicles on the Deck of a US Landing Ship Tank (1944)

Anthony Imre Alexander Gross CBE RA (19 March 1905 – 8 September 1984) was a British printmaker, painter, war artist and film director of Hungarian-Jewish, Italian, and Anglo-Irish descent.

== Early life and work ==
Anthony Gross was born in 1905, at Dulwich, London, the son of the Hungarian cartographer and founder of Geographia Ltd, Alexander Gross (1880–1958), and suffragette Isabelle Crowley (1886–1938). His sister was the artist, writer and publisher Phyllis Pearsall. He attended Shrewsbury House School and later Repton School until 1922, and from the following year studied at the Slade School of Fine Art under Henry Tonks. Later studies were at the Central School of Art and Crafts, London, the École des Beaux-Arts, Paris, and the Academia de San Fernando, Madrid. In 1925 he studied within life classes and as an engraver at Académie Julian and Académie de la Grande Chaumière, Paris.

Following study, Gross painted and produced intaglio prints in Spain, painted in Brussels, and in 1928 returned to work in Paris, and other parts of France, working entirely from life. While in France he developed a working relationship with Józef Hecht and Stanley William Hayter. During the early 1930s he exhibited in Paris galleries, becoming a member of the La Jeune Gravure Contemporaine, designed costumes and settings for ballet, and worked with composer Tibor Harsányi. He co-directed the short film La Joie de vivre with Hector Hoppin in 1934.

Returning to Britain in 1934, Gross worked on animated films, illustrated a 1929 edition of Jean Cocteau's Les Enfants Terribles and became an art director for London Films. In 1937 he returned to work in Paris. Gross had married Villeneuve fashion artist Marcelle Marguerite Florenty in 1930; their children were Mary (b. 1935) and Jean-Pierre (b. 1937). In 1940 he brought his family from France to England, to live at Flamstead, Hertfordshire.

== Second World War ==
Through advocacy by Eric Kennington to the War Artists' Advisory Committee, Gross was offered, and accepted, the role of an official war artist, and produced etchings and oil and watercolour paintings of English coastal defences and troop training. In 1941, with a temporary commission of captain, Gross was attached to the 9th Army and painted within the Egyptian, Syrian, Palestinian, Kurdistan, Lebanese, and Mesopotamian theatres of war, sometimes accompanied by other war artists Edward Ardizzone and Edward Bawden, and later documenting the 8th Army's North African Campaign. From 1943 he transferred to India and Burma to witness the front line battle against the Japanese; these works were the subject of a one-man exhibition at the National Gallery when he returned to England. Later, in 1944 and 1945, an exhibition of 51 of these drawings, entitled India in Action, toured Australia, New Zealand and the United States.

Gross accompanied the D-Day invasion of Northern France, wading ashore near Arromanches at 2pm on D-Day. He sketched the beachhead landings and spent the night in a slit trench on the beach before moving inland the next day. Gross recorded the devastation of Bayeux and Caen, and followed the Allied armies to Paris and then into Germany. He witnessed the meeting of American and Russian forces at the River Elbe on 25 April 1945. Gross was, at the time, one of the many war artists who painted a portrait of General Montgomery.

== Post war ==
Following the war, Gross returned to working in London, in Chelsea, Greenwich and Blackheath, while in the mid-1950s working partly in Le Boulvé. He produced lithographs for J. Lyons and Co., and illustrated editions of Wuthering Heights and The Forsyte Saga. In 1954 he designed the dust jacket for the first edition of Lord of the Flies. From 1948 to 1954 he was a life drawing tutor at the Central School of Arts and Crafts, afterwards becoming Head of Printing at the Slade School of Fine Art.

From 1948 to 1971 Gross's work was exhibited in London and New York in one-man shows and as part of The London Group. In 1965 he became the first president of the Printmakers Council. He became an honorary member of the Royal Society of Painter-Etchers and Engravers in 1979, the same year being elected as an Associate of the Royal Academy; becoming a Senior Academician in 1981, and appointed a Commander of the Order of the British Empire (CBE) in the 1982 Birthday Honours. In 1965-66 Gross was a Minneapolis School of Art visiting professor.

== Public collections ==
Gross's works held in public collections include the British Museum, Victoria and Albert Museum, University of Leeds, Leeds Museums & Galleries, Scarborough Art Gallery, Huddersfield Art Gallery, Imperial War Museum and the Tate Gallery, London, and the Ashmolean Museum, Oxford; the National Gallery of Victoria, Melbourne; Graphische Sammlung Albertina, Vienna; Auckland Art Gallery, New Zealand; the South African National Gallery, Cape Town; the Kunstmuseum, Basel; the National Gallery of Norway, Oslo; the Royal Academy of Fine Arts, Stockholm; the National Gallery of Canada, Ottawa; the Musée national des beaux-arts du Québec, Québec; the Cabinetto Nazionale delle Stampe, Rome; the Rijksmuseum, Amsterdam; the Louvre and the Cabinet des Estampes, Bibliothèque Nationale, Paris; the Metropolitan Museum of Art and the Museum of Modern Art, New York, the Museum of Fine Arts, Boston, and the Smithsonian Institution and the National Gallery of Art, Washington DC, USA.

His work was also part of the painting event in the art competition at the 1948 Summer Olympics.

== Bibliography ==
- Colescot, Warrington, Progressive Printmakers: Wisconsin Artists and the Print Renaissance (1999. University of Wisconsin Press; illustrated) ISBN 0299161102
- Erskin, Robert, Anthony Gross 8 Etchings (1956. St Georges Gallery Prints)
- Francis, Julian. My Brush is my Sword: Anthony Gross, War Artist. The Fleece Press, 2022.
- Graham, Rigby, Anthony Gross (1988. Goldmark Gallery)
- Gross, Anthony, Etching, Engraving and Intaglio Printing (1970. Oxford U.P.) ISBN 0192114387
- Gross, Anthony, Battle Lines (1981. Imperial War Museum)
- Herdman, Robin, The Prints of Anthony Gross: Catalogue Raisonne (1991. Scolar Press; illustrated.) ISBN 0859678377
- Lee, Jane, Anthony Gross: Paintings, Drawings and Prints (1989. Ashmolean) ISBN 1854440004
- Mayne, Jonathan, Anthony Gross (1949. Art & Technics)
- Mayne, Jonathan, 'The Graphic Work of Anthony Gross', in Image; 4 (1950 Spring), pp. 31–48
- Mirante, Edith. “Drawing Soldiers in Burma: Reflections on the War Artists” Global City Review, (2020) #24. online
- Ramkalawon, Jennifer, Anthony Gross RA 1905-1984 - Early Paintings and Prints, A Centenary Exhibition (2005. Redfern Gallery, London)
- Windsor, Alan; Flemming, Rhiannon, Anthony Gross RA 1905-1984: Paintings and Prints from the 1950s (2010. Redfern Gallery, London) ISBN 0948460288
