= Becoming Nancy (musical) =

2019 musical

- Poster for the original UK production
- Music: George Stiles; Elliot Davis (additional); Terry Ronald (additional)
- Lyrics: Anthony Drewe; Elliot Davis (additional); Terry Ronald (additional)
- Book: Elliot Davis
- Basis: Becoming Nancy by Terry Ronald
- Premiere: September 6, 2019: Alliance Theatre, Atlanta, Georgia
- Productions: 2019 Atlanta, Georgia; 2024 Birmingham

Becoming Nancy is a musical with a book by Elliot Davis, music by George Stiles and lyrics by Anthony Drewe with additional songs by Terry Ronald and Elliot Davis. It is based on the 2011 debut novel of the same name by composer Terry Ronald.

== Background ==
The musical, like the original novel by Terry Ronald, is a coming-of-age story set in the south east suburb of East Dulwich, London in 1979 about a school boy, David Starr, who is cast as Nancy in a school production of the musical Oliver! Similarly, Ronald was asked to play Nancy in the late 1970's for his school's production of Oliver! however turned it down but was later inspired to write Becoming Nancy.

Broadway and West End director and choreographer Jerry Mitchell revealed that he bought a copy of Ronald's novel at an airport to read on his flight home to New York City following his work on the West End production of Kinky Boots and wanted to gain the rights to create a stage musical adaptation by which Ronald agreed as a fan of Mitchell's other West End musicals.

== Production history ==
=== Atlanta, Georgia (2019) ===
The musical made its world premiere at the Alliance Theatre, Atlanta, Georgia from September 6 to October 6, 2019. The production was directed and choreographed by Jerry Mitchell with scenic design by David Rockwell, costume design by Amy Clark, lighting design by Phillip S. Rosenberg and sound design by John Shivers.

=== Birmingham (2024) ===
The musical made its UK premiere at the Birmingham Repertory Theatre from 2 October running until 2 November 2024. Mitchell once again directed and choreographed the production, also it features seven additional songs by Stiles, Davis and Ronald not featured in the Atlanta production. Initial casting was announced on 16 July 2024 before full casting was announced on 30 July as well as a 6-track EP being released featuring songs from the musical including "The Risk", "Just For Today", "Ready To Be Touched", "About Six Inches From Your Heart", "On The Night Bus" and "Is This Something?".

== Cast and characters ==
| Character | Atlanta | Birmingham |
| Character | 2019 | 2024 |
|---|---|---|
| David Starr | Zachary Sayle | Joseph Peacock |
| Maxie Boswell | Jake Boyd | Joseph Vella |
| Frances Bassey / Donna Summer | Jasmine Amy Rogers | Paige Peddie |
| Kath Starr / Debbie Harry | Sally Ann Triplett | Rebecca Trehearn |
| Eddie Starr | Matt Hetherington | Mathew Craig |
| Aunt Val / Kate Bush | Jessica Vosk | Genevieve Nicole |
| Hamish McClarnon / Sting | Stephen Ashfield | Stephen Ashfield |
| Abigail Henson | Lizzie Bea | Daisy Greenwood |
| Squirrel | Seth Clayton | Isaac Elder |
| Dennis Gordon | Evan Duff | Lucas Impey |
| Jason Lancaster | Caleb Jenson | Sebastian Harwood |
| Chrissie Starr | Nella Cole | Dominique McIntyre |
| Marcia Tubbert | Luana Psaros | Layla Armstrong-Hughes |
| Bob Lord | Gary Milner | Richard Meek |
| Muriel/Mrs Boswell | Liz Pearce | Rachel Rawlinson |
| Bus Conductor/Mr Boswell | Tally Sessions | Tom Andrew Hargreaves |
| Ensemble | Chelsey Lynn Alfredo; Nico Dejesus; Ian Gallagher Fitzgerald; Jason Goldston; Tayla Groves; Ricky Schroeder; Paul Schwensen | Shannon Bourne; Joseph Craig; Cameron Gabriel; Ollie Hart-Bradford; Peter Lavery; Zara McLellan; Harry Warburton |
| Swing | — | Elliot Copeland; Jessica Daugirda; Jordan Isaac |

== Musical numbers ==
The following is the song list of the original Birmingham production which feature music by George Stiles and lyrics by Anthony Drewe unless where noted;

Act I

- "Welcome to the Beat of My Heart"*
- "Becoming Nancy"
- "Look at Them"
- "You Do You"**
- "The Play's The Thing"
- "I Don't Care"
- "About Six Inches From Your Heart"
- "Big Night Tonight"
- "Move Along"**
- "Is This Something?"

Act II

- "Abigail Henson"
- "On The Night Bus"
- "Who I Am"*
- "Where Do We Go From Here?"
- "Just For Today"
- "Ready To Be Touched"**
- "The Risk"*
- "Have You Ever Had A Love Like This?"*

* Music and lyrics by Elliot Davis, Terry Ronald and George Stiles
** Music and lyrics by Elliot Davis and Terry Ronald

== Critical reception ==
The musical received mixed reviews from critics during the run in Atlanta.

Reviews for the Birmingham productions were more positive receiving four and five stars and standing ovations from audiences.
