= Lizzie Bea =

British actress and singer

Lizzie Bea is a British actress and singer. She is best known for playing Sister Mary Robert in Sister Act and Tracy Turnblad in Hairspray.

== Early life and education ==
Bea trained at the National Youth Theatre.

== Career ==
=== Musical Theatre ===
In September 2019 Bea joined the cast of the world premiere of the musical Becoming Nancy, playing at the Alliance Theatre, Atlanta, Georgia. The show was directed by Jerry Mitchell and has music and lyrics by Stiles and Drewe.

Bea made her West End debut in Hairspray, at the London Coliseum, in the leading role of Tracy Turnblad. The show was due to open in 2020 and was postponed to April 2021, due to the COVID-19 pandemic. The show also starred Michael Ball, reprising the role of Edna Turnblad, Marisha Wallace as Motormouth Maybelle, Les Dennis as Wilbur Turnblad and Rita Simons as Velma Von Tussle.

In 2021, Bea took on the role of Martha Dunnstock in Heathers: the Musical at The Other Palace in London.

Bea was announced as playing the role of Sister Mary Robert in the 2024 West End revival of the musical Sister Act. The part of Deloris was initially played by Beverley Knight (from Mar to Jun) and then by Alexandra Burke until the end of the run in late August. Other notable cast members were: Ruth Jones as Mother Superior, Lesley Joseph as Sister Mary Lazarus and singer Lemar as Curtis Jackson.

In 2026, Bea took on the role of Madame Thénardier in the musical Les Misérables at the Sondheim Theatre in London.

== Theatre credits ==
Year	Title	Role	Venue
2018	Fat Friends the Musical	u/s Kelly, Betty & Val	UK tour
2019	Kinky Boots	Pat	UK tour
2019	Becoming Nancy	Abigail Henson	Alliance Theatre, Atlanta (US)
2021	Hairspray	Tracy Turnblad	London Coliseum
2021	Heathers	Martha Dunnstock	The Other Palace
2022–2024	Sister Act	Sister Mary Robert	London and UK tour
2026	Les Misérables	Madame Thénardier	Sondheim Theatre
