= Jasmine Amy Rogers =

American actress and singer

- Rogers in 2026
- Born: March 9, 1999 (age 27); Boston, Massachusetts, U.S.
- Occupations: Actress, singer

Jasmine Amy Rogers (born March 9, 1999) is an American actress and singer. She began her professional career in 2019 in musical theatre roles and first worked with director Jerry Mitchell when she created the dual role of Frances Bassey and Gloria Gaynor in the premiere of Becoming Nancy at the Alliance Theatre in Atlanta, Georgia. She toured the US for a year from 2022 to 2023 as Gretchen Wieners in Mean Girls. After this, Rogers created the title role in Boop! The Musical in Chicago in 2023. She then played Anita in Jelly's Last Jam at the Pasadena Playhouse in 2024.

Rogers made her Broadway debut starring in Boop! in 2025. For her performance in the show, she won a Drama Desk Award for Outstanding Lead Performance in a Musical, an Outer Critics Circle Award for Outstanding Lead Performer in a musical and a Theatre World Award, and she was nominated for the Tony Award for Best Actress in a Musical, among other accolades. Beginning later that year, she played Olive in The 25th Annual Putnam County Spelling Bee off-Broadway, and in 2026 she returned to Broadway as Ericka in School Girls; Or, the African Mean Girls Play.

== Early life and education ==
Rogers was born in Boston, Massachusetts. Her mother, Jacquelyn, is a pharmacist. Her family moved to Richmond, Texas, in 2010. At age 7, her first role was as a member of Tiger Lily's tribe in Milford Performing Arts Center's production of Peter Pan. She graduated from Austin High School near Houston, Texas, in 2017, where she won a Theatre Under the Stars Tommy Tune Award for best actress as the Witch in Into the Woods. Soon afterwards, she was a 2017 Jimmy Awards finalist.

== Career ==
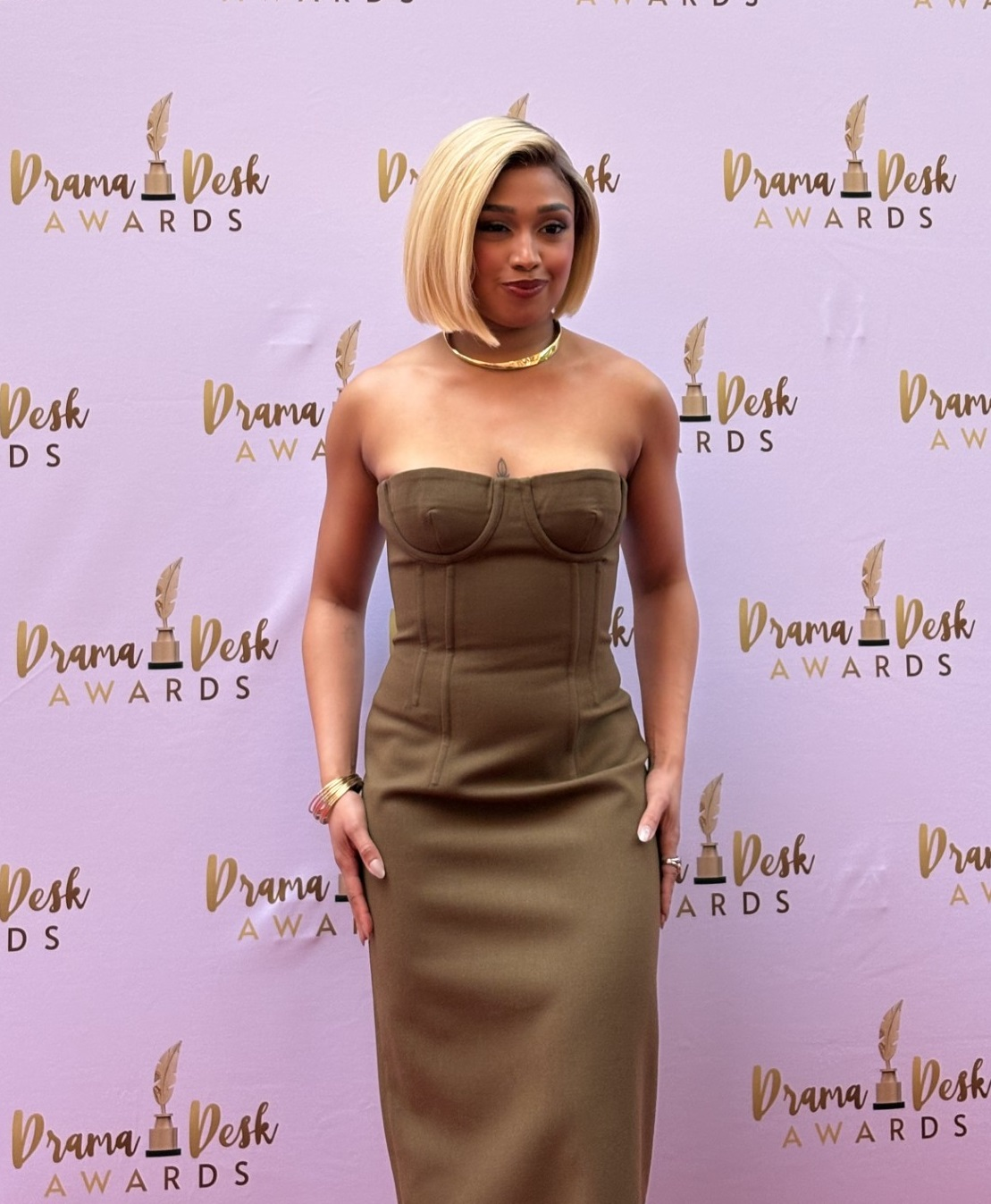
Rogers at the 2025 Drama Desk Awards

Rogers studied musical theatre at Manhattan School of Music for two years from 2017 to 2019, leaving when she began to book professional acting work, including creating the dual role of Frances Bassey and Donna Summer in the 2019 premiere of Becoming Nancy, directed by Jerry Mitchell at the Alliance Theatre in Atlanta, Georgia. After this, she played Melody Green in Paper Mill Playhouse's 2022 production of the Dion DiMucci bio-musical The Wanderer. Between shows, she worked as a babysitter and restaurant hostess. She next played Gretchen Wieners, from May 2022 to May 2023, in the US national tour of Mean Girls.

After additional tap dance classes, Rogers created the role of Betty Boop in Boop! The Musical, directed by Mitchell, in Chicago in 2023. As Anita in Jelly's Last Jam at the Pasadena Playhouse in May and June 2024, she was "a sultry siren ... singing with the buttery vocals of a jazz chanteuse." A May 2025 feature on Rogers in The New York Times concludes that playing Anita was a learning experience that "likely helped strengthen Rogers's performance of Betty [Boop], making it simultaneously more personal and more universal." Rogers made her Broadway debut starring in Boop! in March 2025, and she appears on the cast album, which was released in June 2025. Boop! closed on July 13, 2025. She was widely praised for her charismatic and vocally strong performance. Frank Rizzo, in his Variety review, wrote: "Rogers is a delightful embodiment of Betty, a cartoon that she makes just human enough with warmth, vulnerability and pluck." For her performance in the role, Rogers won the Drama Desk and Outer Critics Circle Awards for Best Leading Actress, was honored with a Theatre World Award, and was nominated for a Tony Award, and a Drama League Award.

In July 2025, she gave a solo concert as part of the Broadway by the Boardwalk series at Hudson River Park. Beginning in November, she appeared as Olive in The 25th Annual Putnam County Spelling Bee off-Broadway at New World Stages. Matt Windman wrote in AMNY that Rogers gives "a performance so vulnerable it nearly re-centers the musical around her". She appeared as Queenie in the Encores! production of The Wild Party at New York City Center in March 2026. Critic Thom Geier wrote, "She can be raw and crass one moment, a sharp-elbowed player ... and then reveal genuine vulnerability in quieter moments. ... She also, of course, sings like a dream". Rogers has starred as Ericka in the Broadway debut of School Girls; Or, the African Mean Girls Play since September 2026. In The New York Times, Helen Shaw singled her out as "an incredible Ericka here, anxious and pugnacious by turns." She is set to follow this as Maria in a Broadway revival of The Sound of Music from March 2027.

Her TV credits include Charlotte in Evil on Paramount+ (2019).

== Theatre ==
=== Broadway ===
| Years | Title | Role | Location | Notes |
|---|---|---|---|---|
| 2025 | BOOP! The Musical | Betty Boop | Broadhurst Theatre | Directed by Jerry Mitchell |
| 2026 | School Girls; Or, the African Mean Girls Play | Ericka Boafo | Samuel J. Friedman Theatre | Directed by Whitney White |
| (upcoming) | The Sound of Music | Maria Rainer | Vivian Beaumont Theatre | Directed by Lear deBessonet |

=== Other productions ===
| Title | Years | Role | Location | Notes |
|---|---|---|---|---|
| Becoming Nancy | 2019 | Frances Bassey / Donna Summer | Alliance Theatre (Atlanta, Georgia) | Director: Jerry Mitchell |
| The Wanderer | 2022 | Melody Green | Paper Mill Playhouse (Millburn, New Jersey) | |
| Mean Girls | 2022–2023 | Gretchen Wieners | U.S. National Tour | Replacement |
| BOOP! The Musical | 2023 | Betty Boop | CIBC Theatre (Chicago, Illinois) | Director: Jerry Mitchell |
| Jelly's Last Jam | 2024 | Anita | Pasadena Playhouse (Pasadena, California) | |
| The 25th Annual Putnam County Spelling Bee | 2025–2026 | Olive | New World Stages (off-Broadway) | |
| Oklahoma! | 2026 | Ado Annie Carnes | Carnegie Hall | One-night concert |
| The Wild Party | 2026 | Queenie | New York City Center | Encores! production |

== Awards and nominations ==
| Year | Award | Category | Work | Result |
|---|---|---|---|---|
| 2025 | Tony Awards | Best Actress in a Musical | Boop! The Musical | Nominated |
| 2025 | Drama Desk Awards | Outstanding Lead Performance in a Musical | Boop! The Musical | Won |
| 2025 | Drama League Awards | Distinguished Performance | Boop! The Musical | Nominated |
| 2025 | Outer Critics Circle Awards | Outstanding Lead Performer in a Broadway Musical | Boop! The Musical | Won |
| 2025 | Chita Rivera Awards for Dance and Choreography | Outstanding Dancer in a Broadway Show | Boop! The Musical | Nominated |
| 2025 | Theatre World Award | Outstanding Debut Performance | Boop! The Musical | Honored |
| 2026 | Lucille Lortel Awards | Outstanding Ensemble | The 25th Annual Putnam County Spelling Bee | Nominated |
| 2026 | Outer Critics Circle Awards | Outstanding Featured Performer in an Off-Broadway Musical | The 25th Annual Putnam County Spelling Bee | Nominated |
| 2026 | Drama Desk Award | Outstanding Featured Performance in a Musical | The 25th Annual Putnam County Spelling Bee | Nominated |
| 2026 | Dorian Award | Outstanding Featured Performance in an Off-Broadway Production | The 25th Annual Putnam County Spelling Bee | Nominated |
| 2026 | Drama League Awards | Distinguished Performance | The 25th Annual Putnam County Spelling Bee and The Wild Party | Nominated |
