= Terry Ronald =

British musician

- Born: Terry Maxwell Ronald
- Origin: South London, England
- Occupations: Songwriter, producer, musician, author
- Years active: 1987–present
- Label: MCA (1987–1992)
- Website: terryronald.com

Terry Maxwell Ronald is an English author, songwriter, music producer and singer.

== Biography ==
Born in South London, Ronald was a founder member and lead singer with the pop band Gun Shy, who released one single, "Just to Be Your Secret", which was Peter Powell's record of the week on Radio One. In the early 1990s, Ronald released the solo album Roma on MCA Records, from which four singles were released.

Ronald developed his career as a melody writer and lyricist, usually working with another writer. His musical work includes songwriting, production and vocal arranging for Kylie Minogue, Dannii Minogue, Sophie Ellis-Bextor, Girls Aloud, the Wanted, Westlife, the Saturdays, Lulu, Sheena Easton, Kim Wilde, Atomic Kitten, Geri Halliwell, Elouise and French pop starlet Lorie. In 2007, he appeared as a guest judge on the Judges' Homes section of The X Factor, alongside Dannii Minogue. He has worked as a vocal coach on music TV shows including The Voice, The Voice Kids, All Together Now and Let's Sing & Dance for Comic Relief.

Ronald has worked on the creative team of several West End theatre productions, including Rent Remixed, which starred Denise Van Outen, Siobhan Donaghy and Luke Evans, and The Hurly Burly Show. In 2013, Ronald co-wrote the musical one-woman play Some Girl I Used to Know with Denise Van Outen.

In 2010, he wrote his first novel Becoming Nancy, published in April 2011 by Transworld and described by Suzy Feay in The Independent as "a deliciously camp rites of passage novel". The book was shortlisted for the 2012 Polari First Book Prize, and in January 2014 it was announced that director and choreographer Jerry Mitchell had bought the rights to the stage musical adaptation which opened in the U.S. in 2019 at the Alliance Theatre in Atlanta. The first UK production of Becoming Nancy opened at Birmingham Rep in October 2024, for which Ronald has written seven new songs along with Elliot Davis and George Stiles.

== Personal life ==
Ronald lives in East Dulwich, South London with his civil partner, Mark.

== Discography ==
=== Solo albums ===
- Studio Sessions (1990)
- Roma (1991)
- Underworld Gospel EP (2019)

=== Solo singles ===
- "Calm the Rage" (June 1990), MCA
- "Chains of Love" (February 1991), MCA
- "One More Dollar" (May 1991), MCA
- "What the Child Needs" (October 1991), MCA (re-released in 1992 with new mixes)
