= Alan Mingo Jr. =

American actor

Alan Mingo Jr. is an actor who has appeared in musical theater lead roles on Broadway and in touring productions and has made appearances on major television series. Mingo has appeared in Broadway productions of Rent as Tom Collins, The Little Mermaid as Sebastian, Kinky Boots as Lola, and The Wiz as the title role. He toured the United States in The Lion King as Simba, Hairspray as Seaweed J. Stubbs, and Shrek the Musical as Donkey. On television, Mingo had recurring roles on Doom Patrol and the 2019 Netflix miniseries Tales of the City and made appearances on Frasier and Law & Order. In 2016, Mingo won the Dora Mavor Moore Award for Best Leading Actor for his performance as Lola in Kinky Boots. Mingo was also a producer on the Broadway production of Glory Days.
