= Boop! The Musical =

Boop!
- The Musical
- Official poster of the Chicago production.
- Music: David Foster
- Lyrics: Susan Birkenhead
- Book: Bob Martin
- Basis: Betty Boop by Max Fleischer and Grim Natwick
- Premiere: November 19, 2023: CIBC Theatre, Chicago
- Productions: 2023 Chicago; 2025 Broadway; 2026 North America tour

Boop! The Musical is a musical based on the animated character Betty Boop, with music by David Foster, lyrics by Susan Birkenhead, and a book by Bob Martin. Betty leaves the black-and-white world and finds colorful adventures and romance with Dwayne, a jazz musician boyfriend in present-day New York City, where she is surprised to find that her fame has preceded her; Grampy follows her to the real world and also finds romance with Valentina (a scientist), superfan Trisha helps Betty, and a mayoral candidate is an antagonist.

The musical premiered in Chicago, Illinois, running from November to December 2023, with Jasmine Amy Rogers starring in the title role. Boop! began preview performances on Broadway at the Broadhurst Theatre on March 11, 2025, and opened officially on April 5. Reviews were mixed-to-positive. It was nominated for 11 Drama Desk Awards, the most of any 2025 production, winning 3, and was nominated for three Tony Awards. It closed on July 13, 2025, after 25 previews and 112 regular performances.

== Synopsis ==
Act One

In the animated black-and-white cartoon world, the star of "ToonTown", Betty Boop, performs one of her shorts ("A Little Versatility"). After the performance has wrapped, an interviewer asks Betty a question that makes her reflect: "Who is the real Betty Boop?" Betty replies, "Whoever you want me to be!" At Betty’s house, Grampy is cooking dinner in one of his great inventions. Another of Grampy's inventions is a teleporter to the real world. Betty wishes to go there, but Grampy refuses to send her. After Grampy falls asleep, Betty wishes for a world where no one would recognize her ("Ordinary Day"). Betty uses Grampy's invention to travel to the real world and ends up at New York Comic Con.

She meets Dwayne, commenting on his bright blue eyes. Betty, confused by all the colors, starts to learn about them ("In Color"). She next meets and befriends Trisha, a Betty Boop superfan, dressed in Betty's style. Betty is surprised that people know her and finds that she is as famous here as at home. Betty takes on the name Betsy Crampwhiler to disguise her true identity. Back in ToonTown, Grampy discovers that Betty is gone and has used his invention. He laments about what will happen to ToonTown without Betty ("Get Her Back!"). Grampy and Pudgy, Betty's dog, use the invention to follow Betty to the real world to search for her.

At Trisha's house, Betty reunites with Dwayne, who lives with Trisha. Betty reveals that she is a jazz singer, and Dwayne demonstrates that he is a jazz musician ("I Speak Jazz"). Meanwhile, Raymond Demarest is running for mayor of New York with his slogan, "You can Do Do it!" In Trisha's room, Betty asks why Trisha likes Betty so much. Trisha says that she wishes she could be as confident as Betty ("Portrait of Betty"). Betty then confides that she is the real Betty Boop, not Betsy.

Alternating between ToonTown and New York, the Director, Oscar Delacorte, his Assistant, Clarence, and Dwayne explain that Betty (Dwayne still knows her as Betsy) is the sunlight in their lives ("Sunlight"). Betty and Trisha meet Dwayne at the red steps in Times Square; Dwayne shares the story of his life in New York ("My New York"). Grampy reunites with Valentina, a NASA scientist with whom he had a romance. Grampy gets a "Love Sneeze" and refuses to believe he still loves her, but Valentina knows that there is no cure for love ("A Cure for Love"). Nelly's Place, a club where Dwayne wishes to perform, invites Betty (as Betsy) to sing onstage. When Betty shocks everyone with how much she sounds and looks like Betty Boop, they chant "That's Betty Boop!" and Betty says she is right where she wants to be ("Where I Wanna Be!").

Act Two

After Betty has revealed that she is alive and in New York, she wishes she had kept it to herself. The people in ToonTown hope she will come back to them ("Where is Betty"). Raymond uses Betty as his campaign manager but refuses to let her speak ("Where is Betty" (reprise)). At Nelly’s, Dwayne laments that he loves Betty so much, but she is not a real person ("She Knocks Me Out"). Trisha thinks she is not good enough and has to dress up as Boop to feel confident. Betty tells her that she doesn't have to be Betty to be confident and that Trisha is her hero ("My Hero").

At Valentina's apartment, Grampy and Valentina realize that they are meant for each other ("Whatever It Takes"). At Raymond's office, Raymond hits on Betty and tries to take advantage of her, so she hits him in the face with a lamp ("Take It to the Next Level"). Betty, realizing what a jerk Raymond is, declares that Carol, Raymond's campaign manager and Trisha's aunt, should run for mayor. Carol agrees ("The Campaign").

Dwayne and Betty comment that we shouldn't think and wish for the future, but instead focus on the present. Betty starts to fall in love ("Why Look Around the Corner"). Suddenly, Grampy bursts in and declares that Betty must return to ToonTown or it will disappear. Betty, while traveling, laments that she has nothing left to amuse her. She almost knew what she wanted, but now it is gone ("Something to Shout About"). Back in ToonTown, Betty declares she is done running away from men. Grampy, Valentina, Trisha and Dwayne appear in Toontown because Valentina figured out a way to travel to both dimensions safely. Dwayne and Betty share a kiss and the world starts to turn to color ("Color of Love").

== Productions ==
=== Chicago ===
The idea for a Betty Boop musical first arose in 2004.

The musical premiered at the CIBC Theatre in Chicago, Illinois, with previews from November 19, opened on December 6 and closed on December 24, 2023, starring Jasmine Amy Rogers in the title role. The production was directed and choreographed by Jerry Mitchell. It featured set designs by David Rockwell, costumes by Gregg Barnes, lighting by Philip S. Rosenberg, sound by Gareth Owen, projections by Finn Ross. The show's musical arrangements were by Daryl Waters, with orchestrations by Doug Besterman. About the modern relevance of Betty Boop as the subject of "a big budget 21st Century Broadway musical", Rogers said, "[S]he is a feminist icon ... from the 1930s, but she still upholds a lot of the same ideals that we want. She’s just a woman that wants to do what she wants ... freely, passionately, with love, and with joy. ... [W]e are still [fighting] for full equality, and ... Betty is supposed to represent ... everything that women are capable of."

=== Broadway ===
The show began previews at Broadway's Broadhurst Theatre on March 11, with an official opening on April 5, 2025. Mitchell again directed and choreographed, with the same principal cast and creative team as in Chicago. A cast album was released on streaming platforms in June 2025. It closed on July 13, 2025, after 25 previews and 112 regular performances.

The musical began its North American tour at the West Herr Auditorium Theatre in Rochester, New York, on October 3, 2026. DB Bonds recreated Mitchell's direction and choreography. Aliya Grace plays Betty.

=== Japan ===
A Japanese tour began at Tokyo's Tokyu Theatre Orb from May 27 to June 21, 2026. It performed at the Umeda Arts Theater in Osaka from July 4–22 and at the Hakata-za Theatre in Fukuoka from July 30 to August 22, 2026.

== Musical numbers ==
Act I

- "A Little Versatility" – Betty Boop, Ensemble
- "Ordinary Day" – Betty Boop
- "In Color" – Betty, Ensemble
- "Get Her Back" – Grampy, Ensemble
- "I Speak Jazz" – Dwayne, Ensemble
- "Portrait of Betty" – Trisha
- "Sunlight" – Dwayne, Oscar Delacorte, Clarence
- "My New York" – Dwayne, Betty, Trisha, Ensemble
- "A Cure for Love" – Valentina, Mascots
- "Where I Wanna Be" – Betty, Ensemble

Act II

- "Where Is Betty?" – Grampy, Valentina, Ensemble
- "Where Is Betty?" (reprise) – Raymond Demarest
- "She Knocks Me Out" – Dwayne, Ensemble
- "My Hero" – Trisha, Betty
- "Whatever It Takes" – Valentina, Grampy
- "Take It to the Next Level" – Raymond
- "The Campaign" – Company
- "Why Look Around the Corner" – Dwayne, Betty
- "Something to Shout About" – Betty
- "The Color of Love" – Company

== Cast ==
Characters	Chicago	Broadway	US National Tour
Characters	2023	2025	2026
Betty Boop	Jasmine Amy Rogers	Jasmine Amy Rogers	Aliya Grace
Valentina	Faith Prince	Faith Prince	Michelle Jennings
Dwayne	Ainsley Melham	Ainsley Melham	Mason Ballard
Raymond	Erich Bergen	Erich Bergen	Joshua Woodie
Grampy	Stephen DeRosa	Stephen DeRosa	Dan Mason
Trisha	Angelica Hale	Angelica Hale	Ashley Calderon
Pudgy the Dog	Phillip Huber	Phillip Huber	Adam Clarke
Carol	Anastacia McCleskey	Anastacia McCleskey	Ashia Collins
Oscar Delacorte	Aubie Merrylees	Aubie Merrylees	Kevin W. Egan
Clarence	Ricky Schroeder	Ricky Schroeder	PJ Palmer

== Reception ==
Reviews for the Chicago production praised the show's music, choreography, and cast, Rogers in particular, but thought the story and characters needed additional development.

On Broadway, the production received mixed-to-positive reviews. While Rogers was widely praised for her charismatic and vocally strong performance as Betty Boop, and the production values, including Mitchell's choreography and Rockwell's scenic design, were acknowledged for their energy and polish, reviewers questioned the musical’s story, overall purpose and execution. Jesse Green of The New York Times criticized the show as a "why?" musical, suggesting it felt more like a brand extension than a fully realized artistic endeavor. TheWrap observed the show's lack of conflict and emotional depth, calling it a "Pooph-worthy" attempt to modernize an outdated cartoon icon. Even among more favorable reviews, such as in the New York Post, the critics conceded that the plot was thin and derivative. Critics generally cited the show's predictable storyline, over-reliance on nostalgia, and marketing-heavy tone as a major shortcoming.

=== Awards and nominations ===
Year	Award	Category	Nominee	Result
2025	Tony Awards	Best Actress in a Musical	Jasmine Amy Rogers	Nominated
2025	Tony Awards	Best Costume Design in a Musical	Gregg Barnes	Nominated
2025	Tony Awards	Best Choreography	Jerry Mitchell	Nominated
2025	Drama Desk Awards	Outstanding Musical		Nominated
2025	Drama Desk Awards	Outstanding Music	David Foster	Nominated
2025	Drama Desk Awards	Outstanding Book of a Musical	Bob Martin	Nominated
2025	Drama Desk Awards	Outstanding Direction of a Musical	Jerry Mitchell	Nominated
2025	Drama Desk Awards	Outstanding Choreography	Jerry Mitchell	Won
2025	Drama Desk Awards	Outstanding Lead Performance in a Musical	Jasmine Amy Rogers	Won
2025	Drama Desk Awards	Outstanding Orchestrations	Doug Besterman	Nominated
2025	Drama Desk Awards	Outstanding Scenic Design of a Musical	David Rockwell and Finn Ross (projections)	Nominated
2025	Drama Desk Awards	Outstanding Costume Design of a Musical	Gregg Barnes	Won
2025	Drama Desk Awards	Outstanding Lighting Design for a Musical	Philip S. Rosenberg	Nominated
2025	Drama Desk Awards	Outstanding Wig and Hair	Sabana Majeed	Nominated
2025	Drama League Awards	Outstanding Production of a Musical		Nominated
2025	Drama League Awards	Outstanding Direction of a Musical	Jerry Mitchell	Nominated
2025	Drama League Awards	Distinguished Performance	Jasmine Amy Rogers	Nominated
2025	Outer Critics Circle Awards	Outstanding New Broadway Musical		Nominated
2025	Outer Critics Circle Awards	Outstanding Book of a Musical	Bob Martin	Nominated
2025	Outer Critics Circle Awards	Outstanding New Score	David Foster and Susan Birkenhead	Nominated
2025	Outer Critics Circle Awards	Outstanding Director of a Musical	Jerry Mitchell	Nominated
2025	Outer Critics Circle Awards	Outstanding Choreography	Jerry Mitchell	Won
2025	Outer Critics Circle Awards	Outstanding Lead Performer in a Broadway Musical	Jasmine Amy Rogers	Won
2025	Outer Critics Circle Awards	Outstanding Costume Design	Gregg Barnes	Won
2025	Outer Critics Circle Awards	Outstanding Projection Design	Finn Ross	Nominated
