= Becoming Nancy =

2011 novel by Terry Ronald

- Author: Terry Ronald
- Language: English
- Publication date: 2011
- Publication place: United Kingdom

Becoming Nancy is the 2011 debut novel of musician Terry Ronald.

== Synopsis ==
The novel is a coming of age story set in 1979 in East Dulwich, South London where 16 year old David Starr is cast as Nancy in his school production of the musical Oliver!.

== Stage musical adaptation ==
A stage musical adaptation had its world premiere at the Alliance Theatre in Atlanta, Georgia in 2019, before receiving a UK premiere at the Birmingham Repertory Theatre in 2024. It is directed and choreographed by Jerry Mitchell with a book by Elliot Davis and music and lyrics by George Stiles and Anthony Drewe (with additional songs by Terry Ronald and Elliot Davis).
