= Mellower Coffee =

Chinese specialty coffee company

- Industry: Beverage
- Founded: 2011; 15 years ago
- Headquarters: Shanghai, China
- Website: mellowercoffee.com

Mellower Coffee (Chinese: 麦隆咖啡) is a Chinese specialty coffee company established in 2011 in Kunming and headquartered in Shanghai. The company serves coffee, cakes and pastries, and has more than 50 shops established in China, Singapore and South Korea.

== History ==
=== Foundation ===
In 2011, Mellower Coffee opened their first shop in Kunming. In 2012, the second shop opened for business, and the Mellower Coffee Academy was founded, providing courses designed in accordance with the SCAA and SCEE standards while offering education on hand-drip coffee, latte art and specialty coffee level I and II courses. In 2013, Mellower Coffee's Kunming roasting factory was established with QS certification to engage in the retail sale of roasted coffee beans.

=== Expansion ===
In 2014, the most influential coffee champions of China and South Korea and champions from the Latte Art Championship joined Mellower Coffee. In October of that year, Mellower Coffee opened stores in Xintiandi (Shanghai) and Kunming. Meanwhile, the phase I SCAE courses were given at the Mellower Coffee Academy. In March, retail coffee products—including roasted coffee beans, drip coffee and bag coffee—became available in chain hypermarkets such as QUICK, C-STORE and Tesco.

In 2016, Mellower Coffee expanded rapidly in Shanghai, Kunming and Chongqing, and the Mellower Coffee Shanghai Roasting Factory was completed. In April of the same year, Mellower Coffee opened their first overseas shop in Singapore.

In 2017, Mellower Coffee expanded their presence to South Korea and, with one of the founding fathers of the coffee industry appointed as the general consultant in R&D, set out to build an all-star barista team.

== Advertising ==
In December 2017, Mellower Coffee continued with their global expansion to the field of international fashion design and joined hands with the Paul Smith World Tour to explore the international high-end consumer market and promote the strategy of global branding. In summer 2018, a Kinky Boots co-branded pop-up store launched at Mellower Coffee's Tongren Road location in Shanghai. Mellower Coffee has specially made a "Sparkle Dance" drink for this event.

== Awards ==
Year	Nominee / work	Award	Result	Ref.
2016	Mellower Coffee	The Best Investment Value Brands	Won	
2018	Mellower Coffee	Most Innovative Companies	Won	
2018	Mellower Coffee	(Industry's) Most Influential Brand	Won	
