= Kinky Boots (musical) =

2012 stage musical

- Chicago preview promotional poster
- Music: Cyndi Lauper
- Lyrics: Cyndi Lauper
- Book: Harvey Fierstein
- Basis: Kinky Boots by Geoff Deane; Tim Firth
- Premiere: October 2, 2012: Bank of America Theatre, Chicago
- Productions: 2012 Chicago; 2013 Broadway; 2014 1st US tour; 2015 West End; 2018 2nd US tour; 2018 UK tour; 2025 UK tour; 2025 3rd US tour; 2026 West End
- Awards: Tony Award for Best Musical; Tony Award for Best Original Score; Laurence Olivier Award for Best New Musical

Kinky Boots is a musical with music and lyrics by Cyndi Lauper and book by Harvey Fierstein.

Based on the 2005 British film Kinky Boots, written by Geoff Deane and Tim Firth and mostly inspired by true events, the musical tells the story of Charlie Price. Having inherited a shoe factory from his father, Charlie forms an unlikely partnership with cabaret performer and drag queen Lola to produce a line of high-heeled boots and save the business. In the process, Charlie and Lola discover that they are not so different after all.

Following the show's conception in 2006, the creative team was assembled by 2010. The original production of Kinky Boots premiered at the Bank of America Theatre in Chicago in October 2012, with both direction and choreography by Jerry Mitchell, and starring Stark Sands and Billy Porter as Charlie and Lola, respectively. It made its Broadway debut at the Al Hirschfeld Theatre on April 4, 2013, following previews that began on March 3, 2013. The musical began a US tour in 2014. The Broadway production ended its six-year run on April 7, 2019.

Having initially been less well received by theatre critics and at the box office than another 2013 Broadway production, Matilda the Musical, Kinky Boots entered the 2013 awards season as an underdog. However, less than a month after opening, Kinky Boots surpassed this rival with audiences in weekly box office gross and later enjoyed a post-Tony boost in advance sales. The production earned a season-high 13 nominations and 6 Tony wins, including Best Musical, Best Actor for Billy Porter and Best Score for Lauper in her first outing as a Broadway songwriter, making her the first woman to win alone in that category. The musical's cast album premiered at number one on the Billboard Cast Albums Chart and number fifty-one on the Billboard 200 chart. Making its West End debut in 2015, in 2016, it won three Laurence Olivier Awards, including Best New Musical.

== Background and creation ==
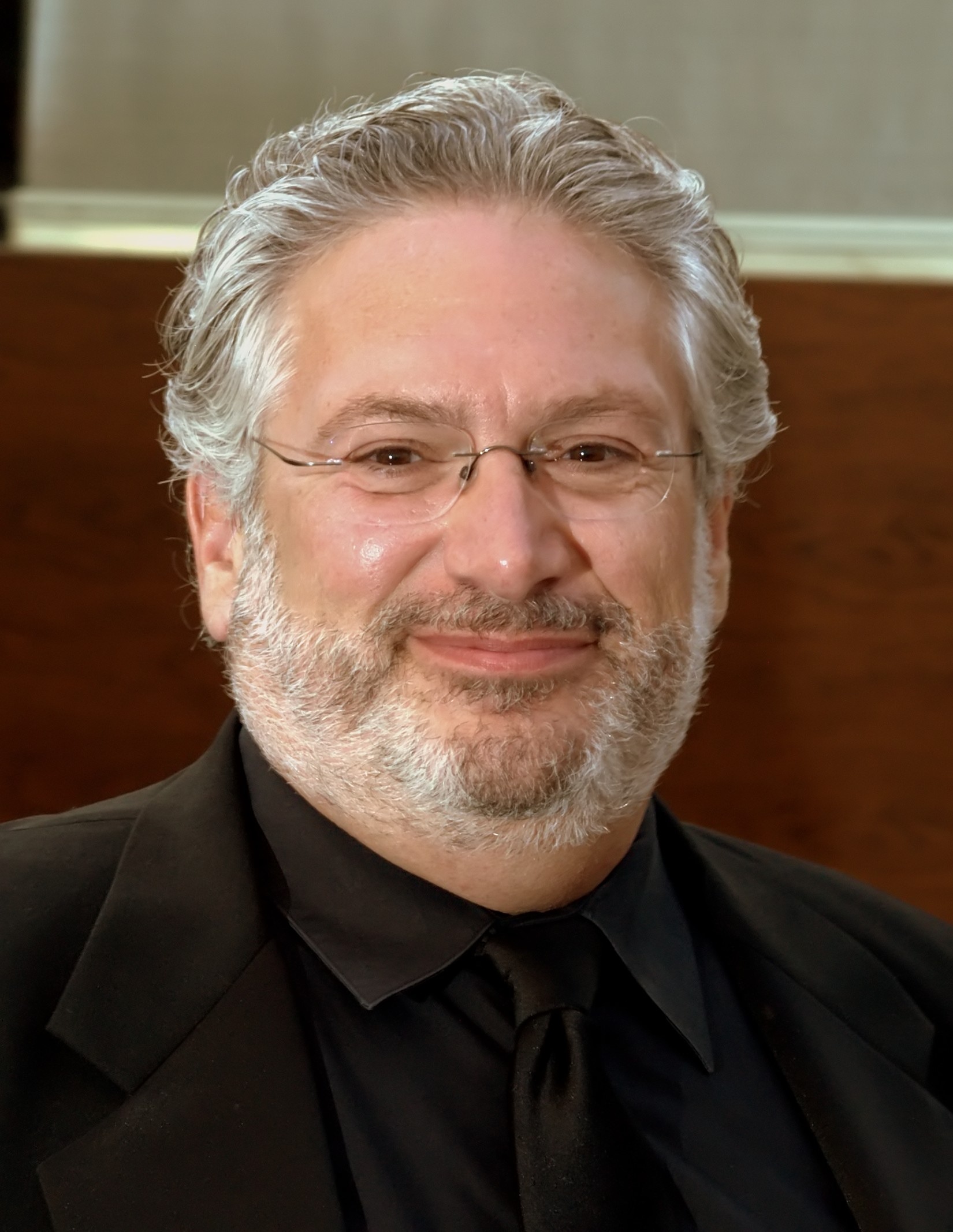
Harvey Fierstein wrote the book of the musical.

Kinky Boots is based on the 2005 British film of the same name, which was in turn inspired by a 1999 episode of the BBC2 documentary television series Trouble at the Top. It followed the true story of Steve Pateman, who was struggling to save his family-run shoe factory from closure and decided to produce fetish footwear for men, under the brand name "Divine Footwear". Daryl Roth, a Tony Award-winning producer, saw the film at the 2006 Sundance Film Festival and fell in love with its "heart and soul". She felt that its themes resonated and thought that the story had potential as source material for a musical. Independently, Hal Luftig saw the film in London and agreed "that its heart and humanity (and bigger-than-life leading 'lady') would translate well to musical theatre." Within a year, Roth secured the rights to adapt the film to the stage and partnered with Luftig, a Tony and Olivier Award-winning producer.

By mid-2008, Roth and Luftig were in discussions with a potential director, Jerry Mitchell, but they still had not found writers. When Roth sent Mitchell the DVD of the film, he was enthusiastic about it. Roth and Luftig hired Mitchell to direct and Harvey Fierstein to write the book. Mitchell knew that Fierstein and Cyndi Lauper were friends, and he thought they would make a good team to create the musical. Fierstein agreed and eventually approached Lauper to write the songs because he "saw in the adaptation an opportunity to work with someone with a big musical range, 'somebody who could write club music,' ... along with show tunes." Lauper joined the creative team in June 2010. Lauper's last project before Kinky Boots had been the album Memphis Blues, while Fierstein was working on Newsies when he began Kinky Boots. The work marked Lauper's debut as a musical theatre songwriter, although she had some theatrical experience, having performed on Broadway in the 2006 Roundabout Theatre Company production of The Threepenny Opera. Among Fierstein's prior experiences were works about drag queens: La Cage aux Folles and Torch Song Trilogy. Lauper has said that she identifies with drag queens.

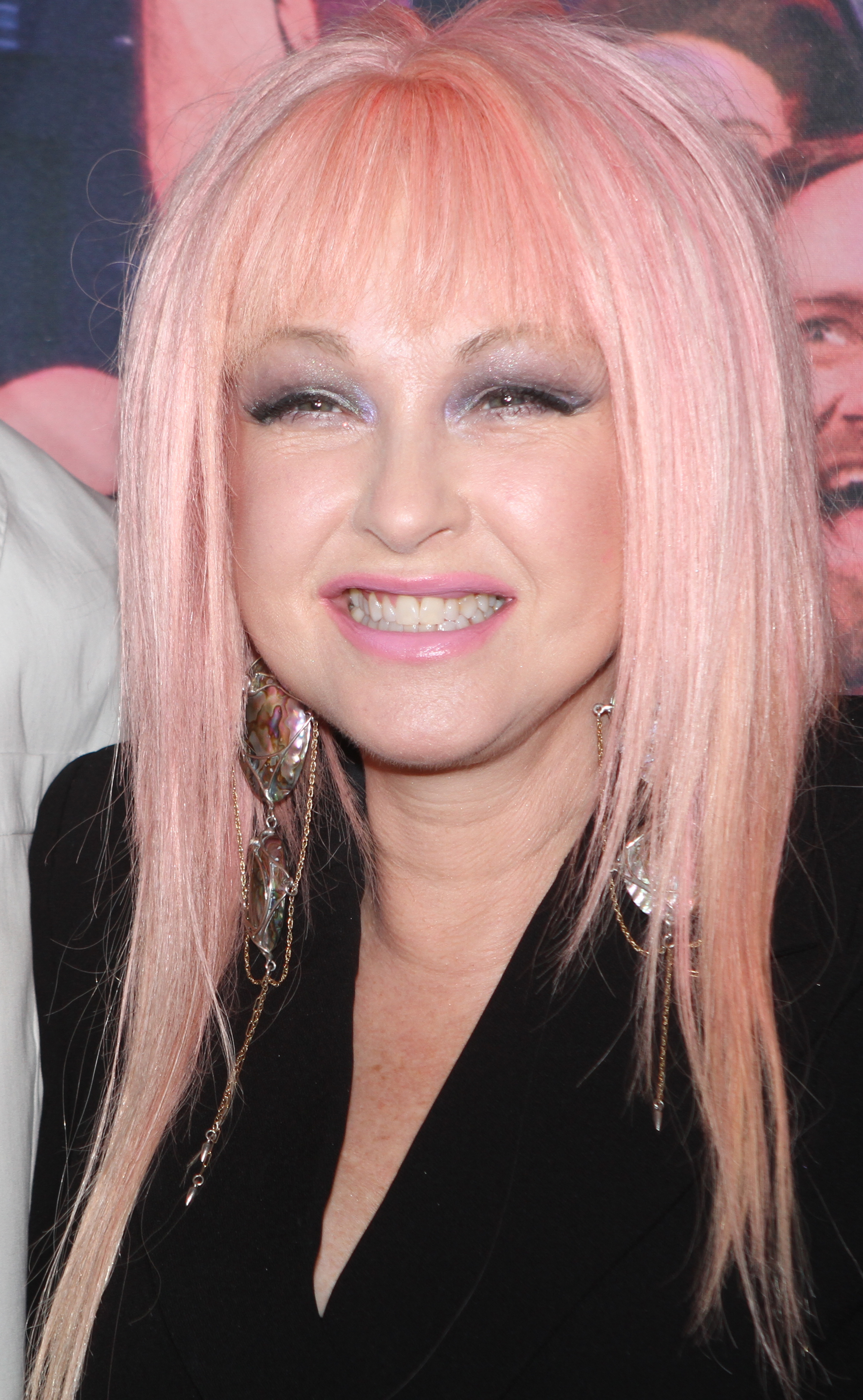
Lauper wrote the songs for the show.

Fierstein and Lauper had both gained previous critical acclaim and honors in their respective fields. Fierstein had won four Tonys: acting and writing awards for Torch Song Trilogy, an acting Tony for Hairspray, and one for writing the book of La Cage; Lauper is a chart-topping singer-songwriter and actress who had won Grammy, Emmy and many other awards for her songs and performances. Fierstein noted a change in focus between the film "about the saving of a factory" and the musical, which include "drag queens singing as they pass along the assembly line." He said the main difference is that the musical is, "at its core, about two young men who come from seemingly opposite worlds who figure out that they have a lot in common, beginning with the need to stand up to their dads." Lauper's inspirations ranged from the musicals South Pacific and West Side Story to Aaron Copland's Appalachian Spring and pop singer Lana Del Rey. In a broadcast interview with Patrick Healy of The New York Times, Lauper and Fierstein said that, in adapting the film, they stressed themes of community and the universality of the father-son bond as vehicles to explore the issues of tolerance and self-acceptance.

Kinky Boots was given a reading on October 6, 2011. Lauper was actively engaged in refining the material once the cast began readings. In January 2012, Roth announced that the show would be workshopped that month, and that Stark Sands and Billy Porter had been cast in the starring roles. In August 2012, the producers announced the Broadway opening date of April 4, 2013.

== Synopsis ==
=== Act 1 ===
Charlie Price grows up as the fourth-generation scion in the family business, Price & Son, a shoe manufacturing company with its factory in Northampton. Another young boy, growing up in London, is as fascinated by shoes as Charlie is bored by them. But in this case, it is a pair of red women's heels that have attracted his attention, aggravating his strict father. Years pass. Charlie's father is aging and hopes Charlie will take over the business. Still, Charlie is eager to move to London with his status-conscious fiancée, Nicola, and pursue a real estate career ("The Most Beautiful Thing").

Charlie has barely made it into his new flat in London when his father dies suddenly. Charlie hurries home for the funeral, where he finds the factory near bankruptcy. The factory makes good quality men's shoes, but they're neither stylish nor affordable, and the market for them is drying up. Though Charlie has no desire to run Price & Sons, he is determined to save the factory and his father's legacy. The workers, many of whom have known Charlie his entire life, do not understand why Charlie moved away in the first place, and many are hostile and skeptical of the new management.

Returning to London, Charlie meets friend and fellow shoe salesman, Harry, in a pub to ask for help. Harry can only offer a temporary solution and advises Charlie not to fight the inevitable ("Take What You Got"). Leaving the pub, Charlie witnesses a woman being accosted by two drunks. He intervenes and is knocked unconscious. He comes to in a seedy nightclub, where the woman he attempted to rescue is revealed to have been the club's drag queen headliner, Lola, who performs with his backup troupe, the "angels" ("Land of Lola"). Recuperating from his ordeal in Lola's dressing room, an uncomfortable Charlie notices that the performers' high-heeled boots are not designed to hold a man's weight. Lola explains that the costly and unreliable footwear is an essential part of any drag act.

Charlie returns to the factory and begins reluctantly laying off his workers. Lauren, one of the women on the assembly line, explodes at Charlie when given her notice and stubbornly tells him that other struggling shoe factories have survived by entering an "underserved niche market." This gives Charlie an idea ("Land of Lola" {Reprise}), and he invites Lola to come to the factory to help him design a women's boot that can be comfortable for a man ("Charlie's Soliloquy"/"Step One").

Lola and the angels arrive at the factory, and he is immediately dissatisfied with Charlie's first design of the boot. Quickly getting the women of the factory on his side, Lola draws a quick design of a boot, explaining that the most important factor is by far the heel ("The Sex is in the Heel"). George, the factory manager, realizes a way to make Lola's design practical. An impressed Charlie begs Lola to stay until a prestigious footwear show in Milan in three weeks, to design a new line of "kinky boots" that could save the factory. Lola is reluctant, as he is already receiving crass comments from Don, the foreman, and some of the other workers, but is flattered by Charlie's praise, and finally agrees.

Charlie announces that the factory will be moving ahead with production of the boots. He thanks Lauren for giving him the idea and offers her a promotion. She accepts and is horrified but thrilled to realize that she is falling for him ("The History of Wrong Guys").

The next day, Lola shows up in men's clothes and is mocked by Don and his friends. An upset Lola takes refuge in the bathroom, and Charlie attempts to comfort him. Lola explains that his father trained him as a boxer but disowned him when he showed up for a match in drag. The two discover their similarly complex feelings toward their fathers, and Lola introduces himself by his birth name: Simon ("Not My Father's Son").

Nicola and her boss Richard Bailey arrive from London and present Charlie with a plan for the factory that Richard has drawn up: closing it and converting it into condominiums. Charlie refuses but is shocked to discover that his father had agreed to this plan before he died, presumably because Charlie was not there to run it. He refuses to sell, and soon the workers are celebrating as the first pair of "kinky boots" is finished ("Everybody Say Yeah").

=== Act 2 ===
Some of the factory workers are not enthusiastic about the radical change in their product line. Some of them, especially the intimidating Don, make Lola feel very unwelcome. Lola taunts him back, enlisting the female factory workers to prove that Lola is closer to a woman's ideal than is Don ("What a Woman Wants"). Lola presents Don with a unique wager to see who is the better "man": Lola will do anything that Don specifies if Don will do the same thing for him. Don's challenge is for Lola to fight him in a boxing match at the pub. Charlie, remembering Lola's background, is horrified. Lola easily scores against Don in the ring, but ultimately lets Don win ("In This Corner"). Afterward, Don asks why Lola let him win, and Lola replies that he could not be so cruel as to humiliate Don in front of his mates. Lola then gives Don his part of the challenge: "accept someone for who they are."

Charlie is pouring his own money into the factory to ensure that it will be ready in time for Milan, and he is getting frantic that the product is not right, angrily making his staff redo what he considers shoddy work. Nicola arrives, fed up with Charlie's obsession over the factory, and breaks up with him. Lola has been making some decisions about production and preparations without consulting Charlie. When Charlie discovers that Lola has decided to have his angels wear the boots on the runway rather than hiring professional models, an overwhelmed Charlie lashes out at him, humiliating him in front of the other workers. Lola storms out, and the workers go home. Alone, Charlie struggles with the weight of his father's legacy and what it means to be his own man ("Soul of a Man").

Lauren finds Charlie and tells him to come back to the factory. It is revealed Don has persuaded the workers to return to work and to sacrifice a week's pay to ensure that the boots can be finished in time for Milan. The astonished and grateful Charlie asks Don if he has paid up on his wager by accepting Lola. Lauren explains that the person that Don has accepted is Charlie himself.

As he heads to the airport for Milan, Charlie leaves a heartfelt apology on Lola's voicemail. Meanwhile, Lola performs his act at a nursing home in his hometown. After he leaves the stage, he speaks to his dying father, and reaches a sense of closure ("Hold Me in Your Heart").

Charlie and Lauren arrive in Milan. But without models, Charlie is compelled to walk the runway himself. Lauren is thrilled by his dedication ("The History of Wrong Guys (Reprise)"), but the show threatens to be a disaster. Just as all seems lost, Lola and his angels arrive to save the day. Lauren and Charlie share their first kiss, and the whole company celebrates the success of the "Kinky Boots" ("Raise You Up/Just Be").

== Music ==
In Lauper's first effort at writing for the stage, she found that it required a sustained effort to write songs for the different characters. Lauper joked about the difficulty of writing her first score: "How much of a stretch is it for me to write songs about fashion, funny relationships, people changing their minds and shoes?" The first song that Lauper wrote was the opening number, which included a wide range of voices. Her process was to conceive a song and sing it into her iPhone, and orchestrator Stephen Oremus would write it down. Oremus would then "'blow up' the vocal line into harmonies, create the incidental music that linked scenes and songs" and orchestrate the material. The songs range in style "from pop to funk to new wave to tango, with highly personal lyrics". New York Times critic Melena Ryzik wrote: "Though there are plenty of hooky, rousing numbers, the emotional heart of Kinky Boots is several ballads about the weight of parental expectations." The musical uses a twelve-piece orchestra consisting of keyboards, percussion, bass, guitars, reeds, violin, viola, cello, trumpet, and trombone.

On August 30, 2017, songwriters Benny Mardones and Robert Tepper sued Cyndi Lauper for allegedly lifting elements from their song “Into the Night” for Kinky Boots’ final song “Raise You Up.” The judge referred the case to a mediator, but no settlement was reached.

=== Musical numbers ===
Broadway

Act I

- "Price & Son Theme" – Ensemble
- "The Most Beautiful Thing" – Mr. Price, Young Charlie, Nicola, Charlie, Young Lola, Company
- "Take What You Got" – Harry, Charlie, Ensemble
- "Land of Lola" – Lola, Angels
- "Land of Lola (Reprise)" – Lola, Angels‡
- "Charlie's Soliloquy" – Charlie
- "Step One" – Charlie
- "Sex Is in the Heel" – Lola, Pat, George, Angels, Lauren, Charlie, Ensemble
- "The History of Wrong Guys" – Lauren
- "Not My Father's Son" – Simon, Charlie
- "Everybody Say Yeah" – Charlie, Simon, Company

Act II

- "Entr’acte/Price & Son Theme (Reprise)" – Ensemble‡
- "What a Woman Wants" – Simon, Pat, Trish, Don, Women
- "In This Corner" – Simon, Don, Pat, Trish, Ensemble
- "Charlie's Soliloquy (Reprise)" – Charlie
- "The Soul of a Man" – Charlie
- "Hold Me in Your Heart" – Lola
- "The History of Wrong Guys (Reprise)" – Lauren‡
- "Raise You Up/Just Be" – Lola, Charlie, Angels, Lauren, Don, Pat, Trish, Nicola, Company

‡Song not included on original Broadway cast album or West End cast Recording.

Chicago

Act I

- "Price & Son Theme" – Full Company
- "The Most Beautiful Thing" – Full Company
- "Take What You Got" – Harry, Charlie, Ensemble
- "Land of Lola" – Lola, Angels
- "Beware the Black Widow" — Lola, Angels
- "I Come to the Rescue" – Charlie
- "Sex Is in the Heel" – Lola, Pat, George, Angels, Ensemble
- "The History of Wrong Guys" – Lauren
- "Not My Father's Son" – Simon, Charlie
- "Everybody Say Yeah" – Charlie, Simon, Angels, Ensemble

Act II

- "Entr’acte/Price & Son Theme (Reprise)" – Full Company
- "What a Woman Wants" – Simon, Pat, Don, Ensemble
- "In This Corner" — Simon, Don, Pat, Trish, Angels, Ensemble
- "So Long, Charlie" – Nicola
- "The Soul of a Man" – Charlie
- "Hold Me in Your Heart" – Lola
- "Raise You Up/Just Be" – Full Company

=== Recordings ===
A Broadway original cast album, produced by Lauper, Oremus and William Wittman was released on May 28, 2013. It premiered at number one on the Billboard Cast Albums Chart and number fifty-one on the Billboard 200 chart, making it the highest charting Broadway cast recording since The Book of Mormon's album was released two years earlier. Before the Chicago tryout, "Sex Is in the Heel" became the first Broadway song to reach the top 10 of the Billboard club charts in 25 years. "Land of Lola" was released as a dance remix by Wayne G. & LFB in June 2013. The album received a favorable review in Playbill from Steven Suskin and won the Grammy Award for Best Musical Theater Album.

A West End original cast album was recorded live at the Adelphi Theatre and released April 1, 2016. This recording was nominated for a 2017 Grammy Award for Best Musical Theater Album.

== Principal roles and original casts ==
Character	Broadway	US tour	Toronto	West End	Australia	UK tour	UK tour (non-replica)	West End (non-replica)
Character	2013	2014	2015		2016	2018	2025	2026
Charlie Price	Stark Sands	Steven Booth	Graham Scott Fleming	Killian Donnelly	Toby Francis	Joel Harper-Jackson	Dan Partridge	Matt Cardle
Lola	Billy Porter	Kyle Taylor Parker	Alan Mingo Jr.	Matt Henry	Callum Francis	Callum Francis	Johannes Radebe	Johannes Radebe
Lauren	Annaleigh Ashford	Lindsay Nicole Chambers	A.J. Bridel	Amy Lennox	Sophie Wright	Paula Lane	Courtney Bowman	Courtney Bowman
Nicola	Lena Hall	Grace Stockdale	Vanessa Sears	Amy Ross	Teagan Wouters	Helen Ternent	Kara Lily Hayworth	Billie-Kay
Don	Daniel Sherman	Joe Coots	Dan Williston	Jamie Baughan	Joe Kosky	Demitri Lampra	Joe Caffrey	Billy Roberts
George	Marcus Neville	Craig Waletzko	James Kall	Michael Hobbs	Nathan Carter	Adam Price	Scott Paige	Scott Paige
Pat	Tory Ross	Bonnie Milligan	Kristin Peace	Chloe Hart	Samm Hagen	Lizzie Bea	Kathryn Barnes	Rachel Izen
Trish	Jennifer Perry	Amelia Cormack	Nicola Dawn	Gillian Hardie	Emma Powell	Niki Evans	Lucy Williamson	Jessica Daley
Harry	Andy Kelso	Mike Longo	Patrick Cook	Paul Ayres	Jake Speer	Joshua St. Clair	Liam Doyle	Liam Doyle
Mr. Price	Stephen Berger	David McDonald	Sandy Winsby	Alan Vicary	Glenn Butcher	Andy Watkins	Jonathan Dryden Taylor	Jonathan Dryden Taylor
Young Charlie	Sebastian Hedges Thomas	Anthony Picarello	Arden Couturier Eric Leclair	Beau Cripps Ben Dawson Edward Green	—N/a	—N/a	Joshua Beswick Leo Hollingsworth Lonan Johnson	Archie John Allen Joshua Beswick Louis Cohen Callum George
Young Lola	Marquise Neal	Andrew Theo Johnson	Isaiah Slater Kaden Stephen	Nana Agyeman-Bediako James Gava Tumo Reetsang	—N/a	—N/a	Sekhani Dumezweni Jesse Manzi Lawrence Ndola-Myers	Sean Garcia Madiba Noah Ronkainen Phillips Rio-Blake Power

=== Broadway replacements ===
- Charlie Price: Killian Donnelly, Brendon Urie, Jake Shears, David Cook, Tyler Glenn, Mark Ballas, Conor Maynard, Andy Kelso
- Lola/Simon: Wayne Brady, J. Harrison Ghee, Todrick Hall, Alan Mingo Jr.
- Lauren: Jeanna de Waal, Taylor Louderman, Kirstin Maldonado
- Nicola: Caroline Bowman
- Don: Tiki Barber

=== West End replacements ===
- Charlie Price: David Hunter, Oliver Tompsett
- Lauren: Verity Rushworth, Natalie McQueen
- Don: Alan Mehdizadeh

== Productions ==
=== Chicago ===
On February 6, 2012, the Chicago Tribune reported that Kinky Boots' producers were considering taking advantage of an incentive program from the State of Illinois for out-of-town tryouts for Broadway shows. The October 2012 pre-Broadway Chicago tryout was announced on February 22, 2012. On June 28, 2012 the full Chicago cast was announced. The production was rehearsed at the New 42nd Street Studios in New York City in September 2012. The show began its pre-Broadway run at the Bank of America Theatre in Chicago, on October 2, 2012, which continued until November 4, 2012. The show was directed and choreographed by Mitchell; scenic design was by David Rockwell, costumes by Gregg Barnes, lighting by Kenneth Posner and sound by John Shivers. The music director and orchestrator was Stephen Oremus. The director and design team had gained previous critical acclaim and theatre or music awards. Mitchell had won a Tony Award for choreographing the 2005 revival of La Cage aux Folles; Barnes and Posner had won Tonys; and Rockwell had been nominated for Tonys and other theatre awards.

Mitchell and Rockwell had previously collaborated on Hairspray, Catch Me If You Can and Legally Blonde. Mitchell told The New York Times that the "Everybody Say Yeah" scene, in which the cast celebrates the creation of the first pair of Kinky Boots with a choreographed celebration on conveyor belts, required repeated innovations and adjustments like the eventual addition of safety rails and actor controls for the apparatus. Designer Derek McLane commented that it is not uncommon for repeat choreographer/set designer collaborations to result in intriguing innovation like the conveyor belt dance scene in Kinky Boots. McLane was impressed with the "series of conveyor belts that came apart, moved around, and fit the context of the story" in order to accentuate the choreography of "a troupe of men in four-inch heels". With respect to the conveyor belts, he said, "They've never been used as dynamically as this, creating a series of surprises, with the kind of wild athleticism that actually looks dangerous. It's one of the more thrilling combinations of stage design and choreography that I can recall."

=== Broadway (2013–2019) ===
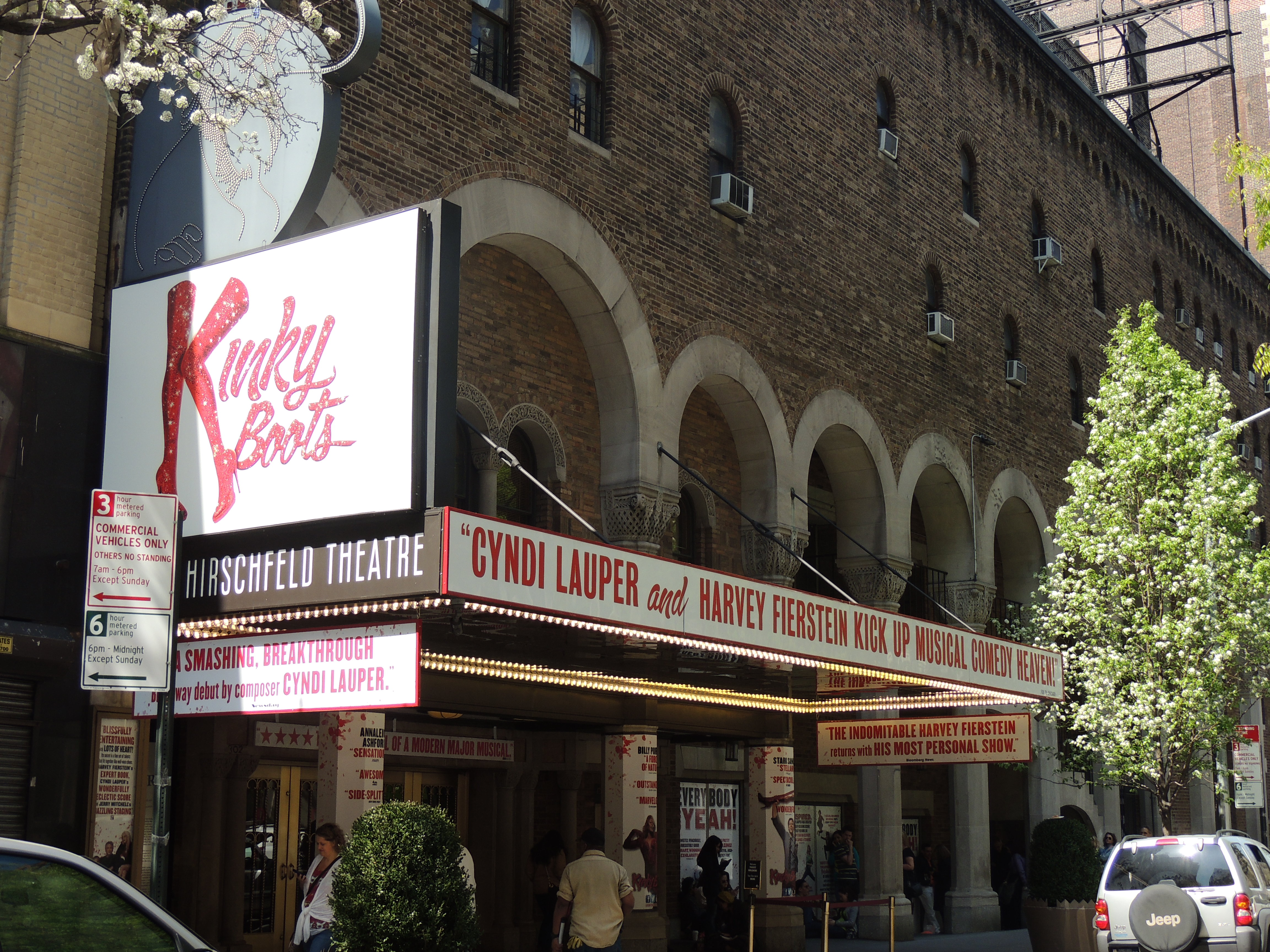
Kinky Boots on the marquee of the Al Hirschfeld Theatre

After the tryout, the team went back to work, adding a new musical number for Charlie and a second song in the drag club, removing another song, and revising the book. The Broadway debut started previews on March 3, 2013 at the Al Hirschfeld Theatre, with the official opening on April 4, 2013. Both the Chicago and original Broadway casts starred Billy Porter as Lola, Stark Sands as Charlie and Annaleigh Ashford as Lauren. Porter, in particular, was singled out for critical praise.

The New York Times noted that in the 2012–13 season, most of the new Broadway musicals were "inspired by movies or books". The paper found the show timely for its treatment of problems that paralleled those at the time of its production, including "chronic unemployment, financial distress and the collapse of manufacturing". Prior to the June 9, 2013 Tony Awards, Kinky Boots had trailed its box office competitor, Matilda the Musical, in advance sales. However, less than a month after opening, Kinky Boots surpassed this rival in weekly box office gross. Kinky Boots won a season-high six Tony Awards, including Best Musical. The next day, the show sold $1.25 million tickets, and its advance ticket sales for future dates became a hot commodity. In the weeks following its Tony wins, the show became so popular that in the beginning of July a special ticket lottery system was created to keep fans from camping outside the theatre. Kinky Boots set a new box-office record at the Al Hirschfeld Theatre, and "recouped its $13.5 million capitalization in a relatively quick 30 weeks of performances", which was "faster than any big budget musical in recent history." In October 2013, Kinky Boots had the second highest premium-price tickets on Broadway behind only The Book of Mormon. After its six-year run (closing on April 7, 2019), the show had grossed $319 million. Following Christopher Balme's commodification paradigm, one could suggest Kinky Boots' unprecedented financial power is a consequence of the musical's ability to "tap into aspects of a society's ideological make-up", such as issues regarding financial strife and LGBTI discrimination.

The musical's economic clout empowers a shift in the American cultural climate, engendering acceptance of cross-dressing and transgender individuals. For example, on November 28, 2013, members of the cast performed the finale of the show in the nationally televised Macy's Thanksgiving Day Parade. Many viewers commented that, in their opinion, the performance was inappropriate for a family program. The performance of August 26, 2015 marked the 1000th Broadway performance for the production. The Broadway production closed on April 7, 2019 after 34 previews and 2,507 performances.

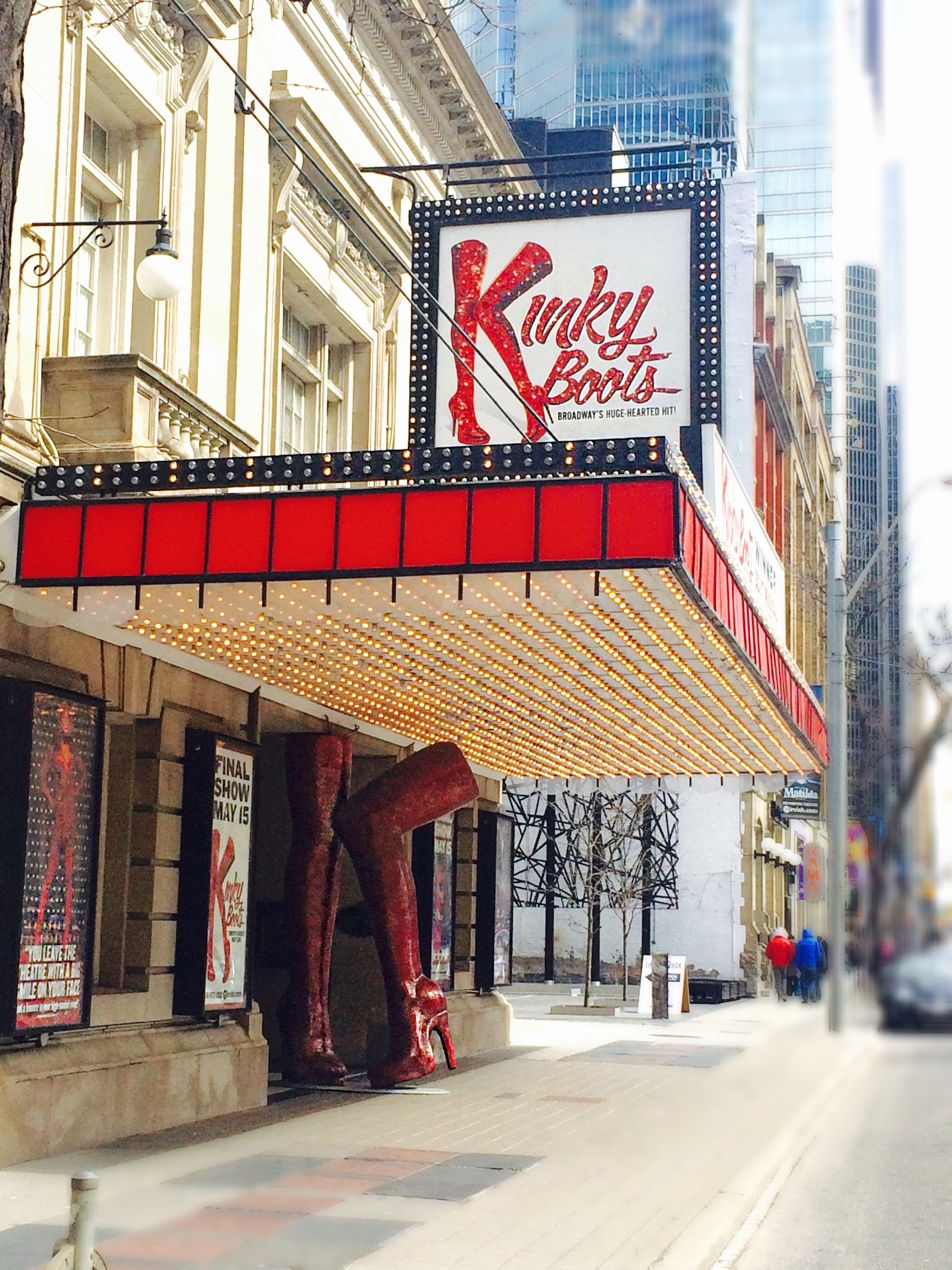
Kinky Boots the Musical at the Royal Alexandra Theatre, Toronto, Canada June 2015 to May 2016.

=== Toronto ===
The Toronto original cast, led by Alan Mingo Jr. as Lola and Graham Scott Fleming as Charlie, began rehearsals with Jerry Mitchell and the Broadway creative team on May 4, 2015. It began previews on June 16, 2015 with its opening night coming on June 28 to critical acclaim.

Initially planned to run from June to September 2015 at the Royal Alexandra Theatre, with a mostly Canadian cast, by the beginning of July, the run was extended to November. The run was later extended to January 3, to March 6 and finally to May 15, 2016, as the final show before the theatre closed for a major renovation.

=== West End (2015–2019) ===
The West End production began previews at the Adelphi Theatre in London, on August 21, 2015, with its official opening night on September 15. Killian Donnelly and Matt Henry played Charlie and Lola respectively, with Amy Lennox as Lauren, Amy Ross as Nicola, Jamie Baughan as Don and Michael Hobbs as George. Although the show is set in a British town, it took a concerted effort to remove Americanisms from the Broadway production. On July 8, 2017, Matt Henry departed from the role of Lola after 2 years and around 750 performances in the role. Kinky Boots closed on January 12, 2019, after over 1,400 performances.

=== Other productions ===
==== North America ====
A North American tour began at the Smith Center for the Performing Arts in Las Vegas on September 4, 2014. The role of Lola was set to be played by Kyle Taylor Parker. Porter took a week off from the Broadway production to perform with the national tour when it visited his home town of Pittsburgh from August 4 through August 9, 2015, at the Benedum Center. The tour closed at The Kentucky Center in June 2017.

A non-Equity US tour was launched in Paducah, Kentucky, on December 29, 2018.

In June 2019, St. Louis was the first city to produce a regional production of Kinky Boots at The Muny (St. Louis Municipal Opera Theatre). The original Broadway producers and team oversaw the production and development. The cast featured Graham Scott Fleming as Charlie Price, J. Harrison Ghee as Lola, and Taylor Louderman as Lauren.

It was announced in April 2022 that a production of Kinky Boots would run Off-Broadway at Stage 42, NY for a limited season. Starring Calum Francis as Lola, Christian Douglas as Charlie Price and Danielle Hope as Lauren. The Off-Broadway revival trims the opening scene, doing away with the scenes depicting Charlie and Simon as children. Fierstein also tweaked the show's dialogue and depiction of gender non-conforming identities, including removing all instances of the word "transvestite" and having Lola include the singular they/them pronouns when addressing the audience. The production closed on November 20, 2022, after 32 previews and 102 regular performances.

A special presentation of the musical played the Hollywood Bowl from July 8-10, 2022. The production was once again directed and choreographed by Jerry Mitchell and featured Wayne Brady and Jake Shears reprising their Broadway roles as Lola and Charlie, respectively, as well as Kelly Marie Tran in the role of Lauren.

Another non-Equity tour kicked off on November 19, 2025, at the Clemens Center in Elmira, New York, starring Noah Silverman as Charlie Price and Scarlett D. Von'Du as Lola.

==== Asia ====
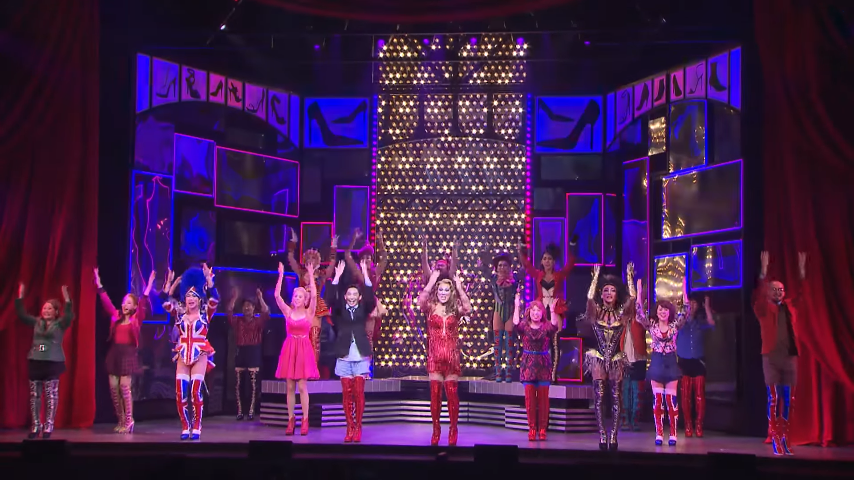
Kinky Boots South Korean production in 2016

A South Korean production ran from December 2, 2014, to February 22, 2015, at the Chungmu Art Hall in Seoul.

The Japanese production ran in the New National Theatre in Tokyo from July 21 to August 6, 2016; the Orix Theater in Osaka from August 13 to 22, 2016; and the Tokyu Theatre Orb in Shibuya from August 28 to September 4, 2016. It starred Teppei Koike as Charlie Price, Haruma Miura as Lola, Sonim as Lauren, Nami Tamaki as Nicola, Katsuya as Don, Arata Hino as George, Megumi Iino as Patty, Mikiko Shiraki as Trish, and Jonte as Harry. Miura won the Best Actor Award and Haruko Sugimura Award at the 24th Yomiuri Theater Awards for his performance, and the play had a second run in 2019, with the cast reprising their roles. A third run took place 2022 with the cast reprising their roles, but with Yu Shirota taking over the role of Lola after the death of Haruma Miura and Soko Takigawa taking over the role of Trish.

A Filipino production, staged by Atlantis Theatrical, ran from June to July 2017, with Nyoy Volante as Lola and Laurence Mossman as Charlie Price. It was revived for a limited run in March 2018.

Another Japanese production ran from April 27 till 9 June 2025 in the New National Theatre in Tokyo, the Orix Theater in Osaka and the Tokyu Theatre Orb in Shibuya. It starred Keisuke Higashi and Shotaro Arisawa as Charlie Price, Shouma Kai and Yuya Matsushita as Lola, Meimi Tamura and Kurumi Shimizu as Lauren, Iroha Kumagai as Nicola, Masashi Oyama as Don, Arata Hino as George, Megumi Iino as Patty, Soko Takigawa as Trish and Yushin Nakatani as Harry.

==== Australia (2016–2017) ====
The Australian production opened on 12 October 2016, at Her Majesty's Theatre in Melbourne. The cast included Callum Francis, from the London production, as Lola, and Toby Francis as Charlie. Joining them were Sophie Wright (Lauren), Daniel Williston (Don), Teagan Wouters (Nicola) and Nathan Carter (George). This production then toured to Sydney's Capitol Theatre and Brisbane's QPAC where it closed on October 22, 2017.

==== United Kingdom ====
A UK tour started on September 19, 2018, at the Royal & Derngate in Northampton, where the show is set, and continued through 2019 before closing at Hull New Theatre on November 23.

A non-replica UK and Ireland tour opened at the Curve, Leicester on January 17, 2025 starring Johannes Radebe as Lola, Dan Partridge as Charlie and Courtney Bowman as Lauren, directed by Nikolai Foster.

The Curve, Leicester non-replica production played a limited season at the London Coliseum from March 17 to July 11, 2026, with an official opening on March 30. The cast included Johannes Radebe reprising his role of Lola and Matt Cardle as Charlie Price.

==== Europe ====
On July 7, 2017 a Polish production premiered at Teatr Dramatyczny in Warsaw, with Krzysztof Szczepaniak as Lola and Mateusz Weber as Charlie.

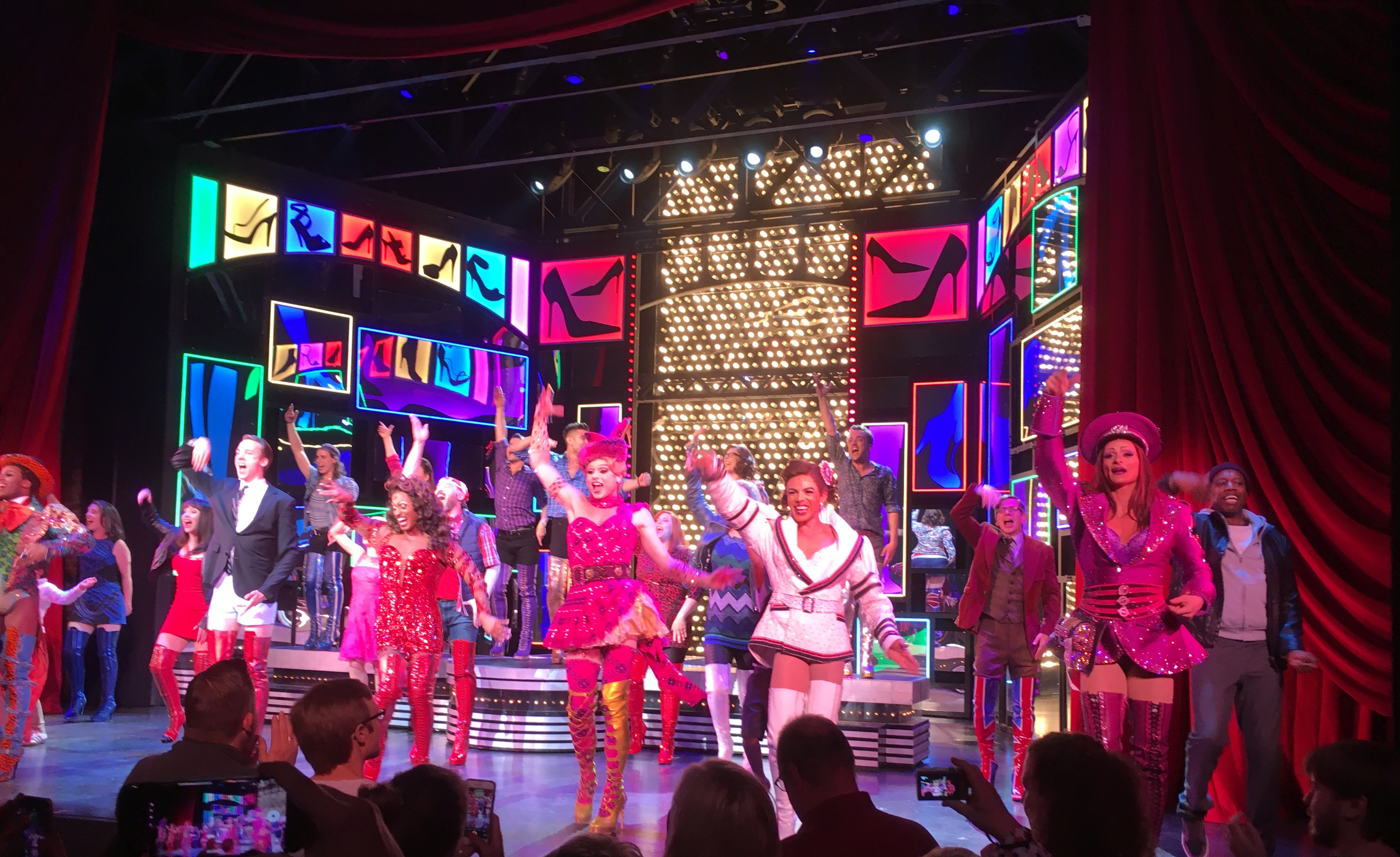
Kinky Boots in Hamburg, Germany (May 2018).

The show premiered at the Operettenhaus in Hamburg, Germany, in December 2017, with Gino Emnes and Dominik Hees leading the production as Lola and Charlie Price. It closed on September 30, 2018.

A Spanish production opened on October 5, 2021 at the Espacio Delicias in Madrid, with Daniel Diges as Charlie Price, Tiago Barbosa as Lola, and Angy Fernández as Lauren.

A Danish production opened in 2022 at Det Ny Teater in Copenhagen with Lars Mølsted as Charlie Price, Silas Holst as Lola, and Monica Isa Andersen as Lauren. The production won a Reumert Award for Best Musical, with Holst additionally winning the award for Best Actor. The production opened again in 2024 with Simon Nøiers as Charlie Price, Kristine Yde Eriksen as Lauren, and Holst reprising his role as Lola.

A non-replica version premiered in Estonia in November 2024 at the Vanemuine theatre in Tartu. It includes Rolf Roosalu (Lola), Priit Võigemast (Charlie) and Nele-Liis Vaiksoo (Nicola) among the all-stars cast.

==== Norwegian Cruise Line ====
In November 2019, Kinky Boots premiered as part of the onboard entertainment for Norwegian Encore, a cruise ship in the Norwegian Cruise Line fleet.

==== Argentina ====
In January 2020 a production of the musical opened in Buenos Aires, Argentina, with Martin Bossi as Lola, Fernando Dente as Charlie Price and Sofia Morandi as Lauren. The run was cut short because of the pandemic, yet it re-opened in April 2022, with Martin Bossi and Fernando Dente in the same roles, and Laura Esquivel as Lauren. Sofia Morandi took over the role again in July of the same year. It closed on August 28, 2022.

== Critical reaction ==
Upon its October 2012 Chicago opening, Chicago Tribune critic Chris Jones described the show as a "warm, likable, brassy, sentimental, big-hearted and modestly scaled" production. Another reviewer praised the score, book, direction and, particularly, Porter, before suggesting that, before opening on Broadway, it could use a more effective opening number, better pacing in Act 2 and "the budding romance between Charlie and coworker Lauren ... needs more lead-in. In other words, give Ashford, a clear crowd favorite, more to do".

The musical's Broadway debut received mixed to positive reviews. The show was awarded a "Critic's Pick" designation by The New York Times, Time Out New York and New York Magazine, and was included in Entertainment Weekly magazine's "Must See" list.

Ben Brantley of The New York Times gave a warm review, calling it "inspired" and comparing the work to other successful recent Broadway musicals: "Like The Full Monty (choreographed by Mr. Mitchell) and Billy Elliot the Musical, it is set in a hard-times British factory town, where jobs are in jeopardy and spirits need lifting. Like La Cage aux Folles and Priscilla Queen of the Desert, it presents drag queens as the show’s official spirit lifters. And like Hairspray, the musical this production most resembles in tone, Kinky Boots is about finding your passion, overcoming prejudice and transcending stereotypes." Brantley wrote that Lauper's "love- and heat-seeking score" wowed with her "trademark ... mix of sentimentality and eccentricity", and that the costumes and boots courtesy of Gregg Barnes made for "big red scene stealers". He also praised “Raise You Up/Just Be,” as "one of the best curtain numbers since 'You Can't Stop the Beat' sent Hairspray audiences dancing out of the theater.” Brantley, however, did not extend his praise to Fierstein's script, writing that his "sticky, sermonizing side" comes through in the second half, where "all the clichés stand naked before you."

The theatre critic for Time Out New York called the show "the very model of a modern major musical." The Associated Press termed it "a big ol’ sweet love story about sons, the families we make and red patent leather. ... Thank goodness for Harvey Fierstein – he spins theatrical magic", but despite criticisms of the script the “perpetual cheer-churning machine” that is Kinky Boots certainly serves an important end goal; to empower not just its central characters, but the entire audience, in the spirit of acceptance. According to Julie Grossman, Kinky Boots facilitates the retraining of the eye to gender conventions and “repositions the marginalised figure as central to the spectacle of mass theatre... enacting a shift in the perspective of the viewer”. The finale “Raise You Up/Just Be” epitomises the empowerment of the individual, empowerment to “Just Be” regardless of the “oppressive gender roles directly connected to patriarchal views of legacy and inheritance” under which Charlie and Lola initially suffer. Entertainment Weekly said "Cyndi Lauper's infectious score is cause for celebration." New York Magazine, The Washington Post and Variety all gave mostly favorable reviews.

Los Angeles Times theater critic Charles McNulty criticized Lauper's "novice mistakes" with a score that "never establishes a compositional through line" and saying that while "Fierstein's heart is in the right place ... the show's earnestness sinks it", adding that "if [the show] weren't such a cheesy commercial mess, it might actually be fun". Joe Dziemianowicz of the New York Daily News wrote that while the "script has issues like a pair of shoes" that don't quite fit, "Mitchell's production moves lickety-split" and "Porter ... is a force of nature as Lola." But, he added, Lauper's "multicolored, surprising and fun" score outshines the fancy footwear and proves to be the "real star of this show". Writing for The Guardian, David Cote noted that the decision to use American actors for an adaptation that maintained the Northampton setting resulted in a disconcerting inconsistency in terms of accents. The Wall Street Journal gave the show a negative review, calling it "an imitation heart-warming British working-class musical with a gay angle and a maudlin ending. ... Kinky Boots is its own spoiler alert, the kind of musical in which you recite the dialogue a half-beat ahead of the actors. ... [the score] sounds like ... "Cyndi: The Deservedly Forgotten Late-'80s B-Sides." A review in The Bergen Record said that the show "sorely lacks is a dramatic commitment to what it's doing. Which is why a show that seems to make few false steps is so relentlessly tedious," calling it "dull" and "synthetic". Talkin' Broadway also gave the show a negative review. The Village Voice, AM New York, and NBC turned in lukewarm reviews.

In 2014, Kinky Boots began a United States national tour, which has also garnered mostly positive reviews. Democrat and Chronicle raved, “Flashy, funny and uplifting, Kinky Boots has appeal — and lots of it — for all ‘ladies, gentleman and those who are yet to make up their mind.’” BroadwayWorld Los Angeles offered “praise to the entire triple threat ensemble!“ The Republic countered, “Despite the fiery showstopper 'Sex Is in the Heel,' however, Kinky Boots is surprisingly short on sex appeal, and the cheerleaderish troupe of drag queens called Angels don't have any of the transgressive appeal of the Cagelles from Fierstein's earlier hit La Cage aux Folles." CBS Minnesota summed it up as “loud, proud and a tubular sensation.”

The London production received mostly raves, with the London Evening Standard writing, "The thigh's the limit for this high-kicking London musical," calling it "a glorious high-kicking romp," and adding that "...its energy is infectious." Time Out London called it "dazzling, fabulously sassy and uplifting," explaining "It's not all glitz and high-kicks...there are some grittier moments that give the show an edgier feel." And Digital Spy proclaimed it "hilarious, heartwarming, and a hell of a lot of fun," offering special praise for the show's star: "Matt Henry...truly steals the show...He is utterly commanding in the role, and you instantly root for him."

It has been argued that Kinky Boots has added to the public discourse of gender, and its flexibility and fluidity. The prevalence of drag culture in mainstream media has introduced a step of separation between femininity and being female.

== Awards and nominations ==
Matilda had been the pre-awards season favorite, but as the season progressed, it became clear that Kinky Boots and the revival of Pippin would provide serious competition. Early in the 2013 awards season, Kinky Boots did well, receiving Drama League Award nominations for Distinguished Production of a Musical and Distinguished Performance, for both Porter and Sands, and winning for Distinguished Production. The show received nine Outer Critics Circle Award nominations, winning three, including Outstanding New Broadway Musical, Outstanding New Score and Outstanding Actor in a Musical (Porter). The musical received only two Drama Desk Award nominations, however, and only one win: Porter for Outstanding Actor in a Musical. New York Times theatre writer Patrick Healy, however, reported that some Tony voters found Matilda "dark" and "a bit chilly", and accurately predicted that "while the cleverness of Matilda may be enough to win best book, the warmth of Kinky Boots will be enough to score an upset and take the top Tony for best musical."

Kinky Boots received a season-high 13 Tony Award nominations. Matilda, which The New York Times described as the "unalloyed critical hit" of the season, received 12 nominations, 11 of them in the same categories as Kinky Boots. In addition to its critical success, Matilda had won the Drama Desk Award for outstanding musical and had set a record by winning the most Olivier Awards in history. Nevertheless, Kinky Boots won a season-high six Tonys, including Best Musical, which the press described as an upset, and Lauper's win for Best Score made her the first woman to win alone in that category. The creative team are Americans, and reviewer David Cote, an American writing in The Guardian, judged that the show's win was a case of "the balance of love going to a homegrown American musical, Kinky Boots, over the British import Matilda." The other Tony wins were for best actor (Porter), sound design (Shivers), choreography (Mitchell) and orchestrations (Oremus). Fierstein, Sands, Ashford, Mitchell (as director) and the three other designers were all nominated but did not win. Kinky Boots also won the 2013 Artios Award for Outstanding Achievement in Casting in the Broadway musical category.

The West End production won the Evening Standard Radio 2 Audience Award for Best New Musical, which was based on voting by the public at the 2015 Evening Standard Theatre Awards. The show earned seven nominations for the 2016 Laurence Olivier Awards, which was second to a revival of Gypsy, which earned eight nominations. Kinky Boots won three Olivier Awards: Best New Musical, Best Actor in a Musical and Best Costume Design, trailing only Gypsy's four awards.

== Collaboration ==
In summer 2018, a Kinky Boots co-branded pop-up store launched at Mellower Coffee's Tongren Road location in Shanghai. Mellower Coffee has specially made a "Sparkle Dance" drink for this event.

== Possible film adaptation ==
On September 15, 2024, Cyndi Lauper revealed during her appearance on Bravo's Watch What Happens Live with Andy Cohen that plans are underway to adapt the musical into a feature film.
