= Jerry Mitchell =

American theatre director and choreographer

- Born: January 15, 1960 (age 66); Paw Paw, Michigan, U.S.
- Occupations: Theatre director, choreographer
- Awards: Tony Award for Best Choreography 2005 La Cage aux Folles 2013 Kinky Boots; Drama Desk Award for Outstanding Choreography 2005 La Cage aux Folles 2025 Boop! The Musical

Jerry Mitchell is an American theatre director and choreographer.

== Early life and education ==
Born in Paw Paw, Michigan, Mitchell later moved to St. Louis where he pursued his acting, dancing and directing career in theatre. Although he did not graduate from the Fine Arts college at Webster University in St. Louis after attending for a year, he later received an honorary degree from Webster University in 2005.

== Career ==
Mitchell's early Broadway credits were as a dancer in The Will Rogers Follies and revivals of Brigadoon and On Your Toes.

Mitchell's first professional credit as a choreographer was for the 1990 Alley Theatre world premiere of the musical Jekyll & Hyde. Mitchell's first Broadway production as sole choreographer was the 1999 revival of You're a Good Man, Charlie Brown, which he followed with The Full Monty.

Mitchell created and for many years directed the annual Broadway Bares benefit for Broadway Cares/Equity Fights AIDS. In addition to the theatre, he has choreographed for films such as Camp, In & Out and Drop Dead Gorgeous. He garnered an Emmy Award nomination for his work on The Drew Carey Show.

In 2003 Mitchell was named one of Dance Magazine's "25 to Watch". He directed and choreographed Legally Blonde: The Musical, which opened in April 2007, and served as a mentor on Bravo's reality competition Step It Up and Dance in 2008.

Mitchell created, directed, and choreographed a stage show for Las Vegas, Peepshow, which opened at Planet Hollywood Resort and Casino in 2009. He was involved in workshops for the stage musical adaptation of the film Catch Me If You Can.

In 2013, Mitchell directed and choreographed the Broadway musical Kinky Boots. He won the Tony Award for Best Choreography and was nominated for the Tony Award for Best Direction of a Musical. He is the director of the new musical On Your Feet!, about the lives of Gloria and Emilio Estefan. The musical premiered in Chicago in June 2015 and opened on Broadway at the Marquis Theatre on November 5, 2015.

He is the director and choreographer of the new musical Half Time, based on the film Gotta Dance, which began performances on December 13, 2015, at Chicago's Bank of America Theatre, and ran through January 17, 2016. The musical has the book by Chad Beguelin and Bob Martin, music by Matthew Sklar and lyrics by Nell Benjamin, with additional music by Marvin Hamlisch. The musical opened at the Paper Mill Playhouse in Millburn, New Jersey on May 31, 2018.

== Personal life ==
He is gay. In October 2022, he married fellow actor Ricky A. Schroeder.

== Stage work ==
- Jekyll & Hyde (World Premiere)
- Three Men on a Horse (1993 revival)
- Grease (1994 revival)
- Jekyll & Hyde (1999 Second National Tour)
- You're A Good Man, Charlie Brown (1999 Revival)
- The Rocky Horror Show (2000 revival)
- The Full Monty (2000)
- Hairspray (2002 Broadway) (2007 & 2020 West End)
- Imaginary Friends (2002)
- Gypsy (2003 revival)
- Never Gonna Dance (2003)
- La Cage aux Folles (2004 revival)
- Dirty Rotten Scoundrels (2005 Broadway) (2014 West End)
- Legally Blonde: The Musical (2007 Broadway) (2009 West End)
- Peepshow (2009 Las Vegas)
- Love Never Dies (2010 West End)
- Catch Me If You Can (2009 Seattle, 2011 Broadway)
- Kinky Boots (2013 Broadway) (2014 US Tour) (2015 West End)
- On Your Feet! (2015 Chicago and Broadway) (2019 West End)
- Becoming Nancy (2019 Atlanta, Alliance Theater) (2024 Birmingham, Birmingham Repertory Theatre)
- Pretty Woman: The Musical (2018 Chicago and Broadway) (2020 West End)
- Boop! The Musical (2023 Chicago) (2025 Broadway)
- The Devil Wears Prada (musical) (2024 Theatre Royal, Plymouth) (2024 West End)

== Awards and nominations ==
Drama Desk Awards

Year	Category	Work	Result
2001	Outstanding Choreography	The Full Monty and The Rocky Horror Show	Nominated
2003	Outstanding Choreography	Hairspray	Nominated
2004	Outstanding Choreography	Never Gonna Dance	Nominated
2005	Outstanding Choreography	La Cage aux Folles	Won
2005	Outstanding Choreography	Dirty Rotten Scoundrels	Nominated
2007	Outstanding Choreography	Legally Blonde	Nominated
2007	Outstanding Director of a Musical	Legally Blonde	Nominated
2025	Outstanding Choreography	Boop! The Musical	Won
2025	Outstanding Director of a Musical	Boop! The Musical	Nominated

Laurence Olivier Awards

Year	Category	Work	Result
2008	Best Theatre Choreographer	Hairspray	Nominated
2011	Best Theatre Choreographer	Legally Blonde	Nominated
2015	Best Theatre Choreographer	Dirty Rotten Scoundrels	Nominated
2016	Best Theatre Choreographer	Kinky Boots	Nominated

Tony Awards

Year	Category	Work	Result
2001	Best Choreography	The Full Monty	Nominated
2003	Best Choreography	Hairspray	Nominated
2004	Best Choreography	Never Gonna Dance	Nominated
2005	Best Choreography	La Cage aux Folles	Won
2005	Best Choreography	Dirty Rotten Scoundrels	Nominated
2007	Best Choreography	Legally Blonde	Nominated
2013	Best Direction of a Musical	Kinky Boots	Nominated
2013	Best Choreography	Kinky Boots	Won
2023	Isabelle Stevenson Award		Won
2025	Best Choreography	Boop! The Musical	Nominated
