= 15 Minutes (disambiguation) =

15 Minutes is a 2001 film starring Robert De Niro and Edward Burns.

15 Minutes may also refer to:

== Music ==
- 15 Minutes (band), a 1981 rock group formed by Steve Wynn and members of Alternate Learning
- 15 Minutes (Barry Manilow album), 2011
- 15 Minutes (Nik Kershaw album), 1999
- "15 Minutes" (Rodney Atkins song), 2009
- "15 Minutes" (The Yeah You's song), 2009
- "15 Minutes", a song by Demi Lovato from Dancing with the Devil... the Art of Starting Over, 2021
- "15 Minutes", a song by Kirsty MacColl from Kite, 1989
- "15 Minutes", a song by Madison Beer, 2024
- "15 Minutes", a song by Michelle Williams from Do You Know, 2004
- "15 Minutes", a song by Sabrina Carpenter from Short n' Sweet (Deluxe), 2025
- "15 Minutes", a song by The Strokes from First Impressions of Earth, 2005

== Other uses ==
- 15 minutes of fame, short-lived, often ephemeral, media publicity or celebrity
- Every 15 Minutes, a Canadian/US drinking-and-driving prevention program

== See also ==
- Fifteen Minutes (disambiguation)
