= Tracy-Ann Oberman =

English actress, playwright, writer and narrator (born 1966)

Tracy-Ann Oberman MBE
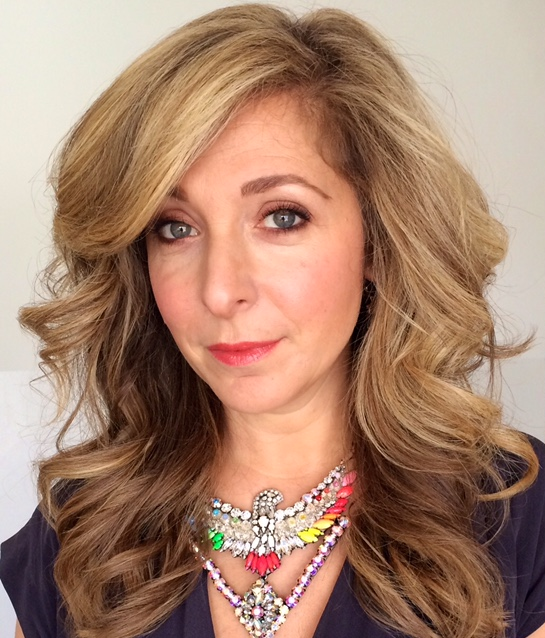
- Oberman in 2015
- Born: 25 August 1966 (age 60); Brent, London, England
- Education: Royal Central School of Speech and Drama
- Occupations: Actress, playwright, writer and narrator
- Years active: 1993–present
- Spouse: Rob Cowan (m. 2004)
- Children: 1
- Relatives: Claudia Winkleman (second cousin)

Tracy-Ann Oberman (born 25 August 1966) is an English actress, playwright and narrator who is best known as Chrissie Watts in EastEnders (2004–2005, 2024–2026) and Valerie Lewis in Friday Night Dinner (2011–2020).

Following training at the Central School of Speech and Drama in London, Oberman spent four years with the Royal Shakespeare Company, before joining the National Theatre. Her theatrical experience includes appearing with Kenneth Branagh in David Mamet's Edmond (2003) and a run in the West End revival of Boeing-Boeing (2007–2008). She appeared in a production of Earthquakes in London in its 2011 run as Sarah Sullivan. Oberman has performed in more than 600 radio plays since the mid-1990s.

Oberman's TV credits have also included Doctor Who, Mistresses, Robin Hood, and Doctors. Before EastEnders, Oberman appeared in a variety of television programmes, including Casualty (1997–1998), Kiss Me Kate (1998), and The Bill (2000), and carved out a comedic niche with leading roles in Bob Martin (2000–2001), Lenny Henry in Pieces (2000–2003), Big Train (2002), and Toast of London (2013–2015). She had a recurring role in the penultimate and last series of procedural comedy-drama New Tricks (2014–2015) as Fiona Kennedy, a forensic pathologist. Oberman appeared in Tracey Ullman's Show and Tracey Breaks the News from 2016 to 2018.

Oberman has contributed to several radio sketch shows and, in 2008, co-authored with Diane Samuels the play 3 Sisters on Hope Street. In 2010, she wrote and starred alongside Catherine Tate in her BBC Radio 4 play Bette and Joan and Baby Jane and, in 2012, wrote the BBC Radio 4 play Rock and Doris and Elizabeth. In 2015, she wrote and starred in the third part of her Hollywood Trilogy for BBC Radio 4, Mrs. Robinson, I Presume, alongside John Simm and Kevin Bishop. Oberman was a regular columnist for The Guardian newspaper during 2007, for which she is still an occasional contributor. She was a regular contributor to The Jewish Chronicle (2009–2017) and also contributes to Red magazine.

== Early life and education ==
Oberman was born in Brent, Greater London, and is from a Jewish background. She grew up in north London, attending Heathfield School for Girls, before going on to study classics at Leeds University but, after a year, she moved to Manchester University to pursue drama. After graduating, she was accepted into the Central School of Speech and Drama, where she trained as an actor. In 1991, Oberman studied for a term at the Moscow Art Theatre School as part of her training. Oberman has spoken of how her drive for professionalism was a result of her parents' initial concern with her career choice.

As she came from a strong legal background, her family "weren't wildly happy" about her desire to become an actress: "My parents were always making me watch Rumpole of the Bailey, going 'You see? It's just like acting, you make things up, you wear a wig and a funny outfit. Why not the law?' But I just always wanted to act, as far back as I remember." Her joining the Royal Shakespeare Company, however, finally won her parents over. However, in a 2004 interview, Oberman noted that her father's death seven years earlier prevented him seeing the development of her career and her national success as an actor: "I've come a long way in my career since he died and I wish he was here to see it. He was a big EastEnders fan so I know he'd be very, very proud of me."

== Acting ==
=== Theatre ===
After leaving the Central School of Speech and Drama, Oberman joined the Royal Shakespeare Company. In 1993, she took part in the RSC's award-winning production of Christopher Marlowe's Tamburlaine as Olympia. This was followed by roles in The Changeling, as "Diaphanta", A Jovial Crew in the part of "Joan Cope", and The Beggar's Opera where she played Molly Brazen. In 1994, she completed her run at the RSC playing in Macbeth and A Christmas Carol.

After performing in several West End productions, Oberman played at the Royal National Theatre in Clifford Odets' Waiting for Lefty during 1999. This was followed by starring in School Play at the Soho Theatre. The play was lauded by The Guardian critic Michael Billington as a "remarkable" production, praising Oberman for her successful portrayal of Miss Fay as "the teacher torn between her career and her pupil's potential".

In 2003, Oberman returned to the National in Edmond, playing opposite Kenneth Branagh. Her role as wife to Branagh's title character was well received by some critics, Norman Miller in a BBC News review commended Oberman for making a particular "impression".

That year also saw her star in Hello and Goodbye at the Southwark Playhouse. According to Fiona Mountford in The Evening Standard, the production was "given the outing of its life by" Oberman and her co-star, Zubin Varla. The review in The British Theatre Guide was similarly positive, praising Oberman who "rages away" in the role of "Hester", and delivers "one of the best performances in town".

She took a couple of years away from acting with the birth of her daughter in August 2006. At the end of 2007 she returned full-time to work in the West End revival of Boeing-Boeing, playing "Gretchen" opposite Jean Marsh and Jennifer Ellison.

In July 2008 Oberman starred in the world premiere of On the Rocks as Frieda Lawrence, wife of novelist D. H. Lawrence. The play, by Amy Rosenthal, follows the marriage of the Lawrences during one idyllic summer in 1916, most reviews following the line taken by Benedict Nightingale of The Times in declaring Oberman to have given a "fine performance... as a gloriously sensual, blowsily defiant Frieda".

In 2011, she played in the touring production of Earthquakes in London by Mike Bartlett which was an updated version of the National Theatre / Headlongs production earlier that year.

In December 2012 Oberman returned to the stage at the Hampstead Theatre in the premiere of Old Money by Sarah Wooley directed by Terry Johnson. In 2015, Oberman played the role of Isabella Blow in the play McQueen, at the St James Theatre, London.

=== Radio ===
Oberman has appeared in over 600 radio plays. She has acted in radio drama and radio comedy, appearing regularly on BBC Radio 4 as a member of the station's unofficial "repertory" company, including; The Way It Is (1998–2001), the leading role in The Attractive Young Rabbi (1999–2002), The Sunday Format (1999–2004), and Getting Nowhere Fast.

At the end of 2009, Oberman returned to radio to star in "Gregory Evans' mind-boggling play" Shirleymander for Radio 4, with reviewer Moira Petty describing Oberman's turn as Dame Shirley Porter as "freakishly real". In 2010, Oberman remained with the radio medium, performing opposite Catherine Tate.

=== Television and EastEnders ===
Her first major television role was in 1997 when she was cast as Zoe Gerrard, a security officer in the medical drama Casualty.

In 1998, she joined the cast of Comedy Nation, a satirical sketch show that featured some of Britain's leading up-and-coming comedians, such as Sacha Baron Cohen, Julian Barratt, and Robert Webb. This was followed by an assortment of parts in various television productions, including a performance in a two-part story for the police serial The Bill in 2000.

That year Oberman was cast as series regular "Beverly Jordan" opposite Michael Barrymore in Bob Martin, and became a lead performer in Lenny Henry in Pieces, starring actor/comedian Lenny Henry, which ran until 2003. In 2002, Oberman joined the second and final series of the sketch show Big Train, performing beside comedians Simon Pegg and Catherine Tate.

The following year saw the Harringham Harker move from radio to television as part of BBC 2's Autumn line-up alongside The Office and Coupling, with Oberman continuing in her role as lead and writer.

She has appeared in many other TV programmes, including; The Way It Is (2000), Bob Martin (2000–2001) opposite Michael Barrymore, Lenny Henry in Pieces (2000–2001), Big Train (2002), SuperTex (2003) and in episodes of Doctors, The Last Detective, Where the Heart Is, The Bill, Casualty. She played the previously unseen character of Marion in a special half-hour episode of the monologue series Marion and Geoff in 2001.

In 2004, Oberman moved away from comedy to join the BBC soap opera EastEnders, after she was cast as Chrissie Watts, the second wife of "one of the best-loved villains in soap history", "Dirty" Den Watts. It was a role she played for almost two years, and which brought her public recognition. Before long, Oberman would become one of the leading regulars of the show and at the forefront of several storylines. At the time, though, television critics pointed to Oberman's extensive theatrical background and questioned: "why would an actress with such pedigree agree to be in EastEnders?" Oberman has continuously responded by placing the move in the context of her professional exposure, noting her position as a "jobbing actress" at the time and her desire to return to drama after her recent comedic roles. Making her debut on 29 April, Oberman was viewed as an "overnight success" in the role of Chrissie, with Amy Raphael of The Telegraph feeling that the actress "easily upstaged the rest of the cast with her three-dimensional portrayal of a classic soap bitch". In 2005, "18 million people" watched her character kill Den in a fit of rage to mark the 20th anniversary of EastEnders, with Oberman "anchoring" the show's success that year and dominating drama as Chrissie, who "packed into a year what most soap characters do in three." Commenting on her role two years after she left the show, Oberman concluded:

I think the character, from the feedback I get, made a huge impact because people couldn't decide whether she was a villain or a victim. In hindsight I loved it; I loved the character, I loved the acting challenge, I loved the discipline. You're learning all the time because you literally do 25 scenes a day, go home, learn another 20 scenes, come in, film 20 scenes, go home... every day for a year and a half, and you do all your own stunts... being punched in the face by Peggy Mitchell and having to fall into a seven-foot grave; it was fantastic. I was only in it for 18 months and it feels like I clocked up about three years worth of TV experience.

Oberman described her time on EastEnders as "hectic", leading her to depart the show during December 2005. However, the role of Chrissie has remained a defining point of her career. In a recent interview, Oberman remarked: "Chrissie was such a wonderful character and the show was watched by so many people, especially the murder of Den, that it opened up doors that I never thought it would. I had some fantastic offers when I left, there were film and theatre... it was wonderful for me; EastEnders is a very good calling card." Oberman has also recently declared her willingness to return to the part of Chrissie and EastEnders, even if only to provide a resolution for the character.

Before leaving EastEnders, Oberman provided the voice of "Miss Dickson" in the adult-themed cartoon Bromwell High for Channel Four.

It was also announced that Oberman would guest star in the second series of the revived Doctor Who, playing the character of Yvonne Hartman, whom she described as "a sophisticated sort of baddie", with a BBC source declaring Oberman "perfect to play evil Yvonne and will be brilliant at terrorising the next generation of viewers". The two-part series finale entitled "Army of Ghosts" and "Doomsday", aired in July 2006, attracting audiences of 8.19 million and 8.22 million respectively. Oberman extols her appearance in Doctor Who as a career highlight, being a "confessed Whovian" or fan of the show: "Some people, their life's ambition is to walk in and see Queen Vic, mine was to see a Tardis and a sonic screwdriver... and a Dalek!"

In 2006, Oberman signed on to the BBC One six-part comedy-drama series Sorted as series regular Amy, alongside Will Mellor. In 2008, she made a brief return to TV in the CBBC production Summerhill.

In 2009, Oberman made several guest-starring roles in BBC television programmes, beginning with Mistresses in which she played the owner of a sex-toy company. This was followed by a part in the BBC One drama Robin Hood, as the wife of the Sheriff of York. In September, Oberman returned to the medical series Doctors five years after first appearing in the programme, undertaking the role of 'black widow' Cathy Harley. Oberman had a part in the "web thriller" Girl Number 9, which she playfully described as "the first Twitter-related drama that there's ever been!" Penned by James Moran, the adult-themed online horror series was headlined as a "big step forward" for British web drama, with Oberman playing the lead detective "Lyndon" beside Gareth David-Lloyd.

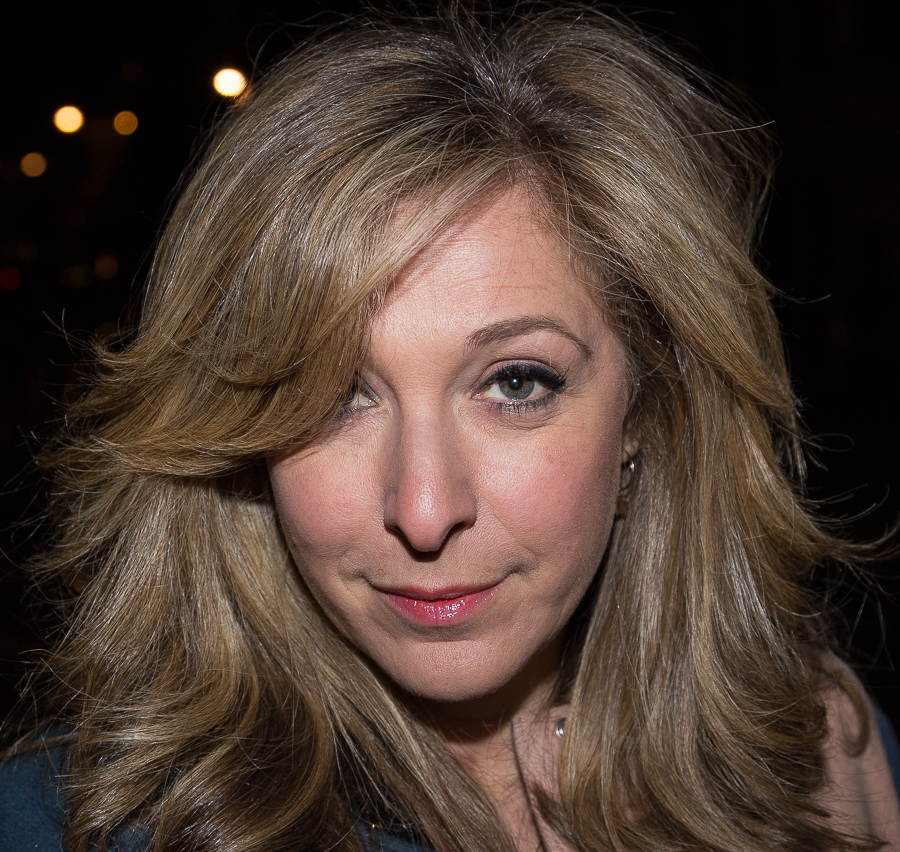
Oberman in December 2014

From 2011 to 2020 Oberman played Auntie Val in the Channel 4 sitcom Friday Night Dinner and between 2012 and 2015, Oberman played Mrs. Purchase in Matt Berry and Arthur Mathew's comedy, Toast of London.

In May–July 2013, Oberman filmed the 6 part series Give Out Girls for Sky Living/Big Talk productions as Debbie, the head of Hot Staff promotions girls.

In January 2014, Oberman played the character, Audrey MacMurray, in the final episode of the second series of Father Brown which was shown on BBC One in their afternoon schedule and later in the evening on BBC Two in the evening. Also that year, she appeared in Crims for BBC Three playing 'hard as nails' Governor Riley.

New Tricks, the high ratings BBC drama, saw her appear regularly as forensic anthropologist-Fiona Kennedy (series 11 and 12).

Oberman kept up her string of TV guest appearances with a role in the drama Tracy Beaker Returns, playing "Terrie Fender", a travel agent and con artist. She also joined the junior spy series M.I. High, as the "Grand Mistress". Appearing on the chat show, The Wright Stuff, Oberman revealed that she undertook the part because M. I. High was her nephew's favourite programme, but also added that she was a fan herself, describing it as a "junior version of Spooks.

Oberman has appeared in two of Tracey Ullman series; Tracey Breaks the News and Tracey Ullman's Show, a BBC One production between 2016 and 2018.

Most recently, she has appeared as Rebecca in Netflix series After Life alongside Ricky Gervais, as Helen Chalmers in Sky One comedy-drama Code 404 and as Ritchie’s agent, Carol Carter, in Channel 4 drama It's a Sin.

In July 2024, nineteen years after her departure from EastEnders, it was announced that Oberman would be reprising her role of Chrissie Watts for short stint later in the year.

Oberman told the BBC ""Chrissie Watts was such a great character to play - a victim or a villain," she said. She is a real fan favourite so, when [executive producer] Chris Clenshaw asked me to come back and revisit her and see what has happened in the last 19 years, I jumped at the chance".

== Writing ==
From 2006 to 2007, Oberman was a regular columnist for The Guardian newspaper. From 2009–2017, she was a regular columnist for The Jewish Chronicle.

Oberman wrote and performed in her first BBC Radio 4 play which went out to great critical acclaim on 29 April 2010. Catherine Tate played Bette Davis and Oberman herself (after persuasion by the producer) played Joan Crawford, with Lorelei King as Hedda Hopper. The play was chosen as Pick of The Week by Gillian Reynolds, and garnered a huge amount of press interest due to the subject matter, and it being Oberman's first radio play.

She followed this up three weeks later by writing and performing her own BBC Radio 4 short story called "Girl on an Island" as part of a series of three called Actors' Voices (along with Anna Massey and James Dreyfus).

On 16 October 2012 BBC Radio 4 broadcast her second radio play Rock and Doris and Elizabeth (starring Frances Barber and Jonathan Hyde as Rock Hudson and Doris Day, and Oberman as Elizabeth Taylor) to very positive feedback. It followed Rock Hudson's AIDS scandal hitting the world's media after appearing on his old friend Doris Day's cable network show. Radio Drama Review Online described it as "poignant and utterly spellbinding".

In December 2020 BBC Radio 4 broadcast her play That Summer Of '67, a dramatisation concerning the production of the ground-breaking film Guess Who's Coming To Dinner.

She has also written comedy sketches and a sitcom for BBC Three, The Harringham Harker.

Oberman co-wrote 3 Sisters on Hope Street with playwright and neighbour Diane Samuels. The play, published in 2008, is a reinterpretation of Chekhov's The Three Sisters, transferring events to Liverpool after the Second World War, and re-casting the Prozorova sisters as three Jewish Englishwomen.

Another radio play written by Oberman was Mrs Robinson, I Presume for BBC Radio 4 which told the story of how the film The Graduate was produced.

== Other work ==
Oberman has appeared as a guest reviewer on an episode of Film 2007 with Jonathan Ross, as a contestant on a Doctor Who special of The Weakest Link – she was the second one voted off – and as a special guest performer in Tim Crouch's two-hander The Oak Tree at the Soho Theatre. In 2004, she came a close second place on Celebrity Mastermind, the specialist subject being "The Imperial Roman Family Augustus to Claudius Caesar". She also appeared on Test the Nation during this period.

In September 2005, she was a guest on Friday Night with Jonathan Ross. In 2006, she was the guest on Nigel Slater's A Taste of My Life and, in 2007, Oberman appeared on BBC One's Saturday Kitchen. She has featured in the BBC Radio 4 show Rudy's Rare Records.

Oberman is also known for her narration of advertisements and documentaries, such as Five's I'm A Celebrity: Who Won! and Channel 4's "Escape to the Chateau".

Oberman is featured in the video for The Yeah You's debut single "15 Minutes", hosting her fictional chat show, interviewing the rock band.

She made it through to the quarter-finals of Celebrity MasterChef in 2009. Oberman was a regular panellist on The Wright Stuff.

Oberman hosted the 2009 International Hall of Fame Awards at the International Women's Forum World Leadership Conference in Miami, from 7 to 9 October that year.

In 2011, Oberman appeared in Born To Shine singing folk music and playing the guitar.

In 2012, Oberman was a judge, alongside Yiddish scholar David Katz, on a Channel 4 reality series, Jewish Mum of the Year. Commenting on the series, Maureen Lipman said "It's disgusting. It is very damaging, with antisemitism being what it is. Not to mention that being a Jewish mother is nothing like the way they portray it". Former BBC chairman Michael Grade also criticised the programme, saying: "I don't know what it was supposed to be. They seemed to cram in every cliché in the book".

She hosts the podcast Trolled with Tracy Ann Oberman, with past guests including Danny Baker, Rachel Riley, Dom Joly and more. Oberman has also appeared on other podcasts, including The QuaranTea Break Podcast with Simon Ward.

== Views on Israel and antisemitism ==
Oberman has described Israel as "a country I love", has friends and family living there and has holidayed there throughout her life. In April 2012, and again in September 2014, she called on supporters of Israel to be more active in campaigning on Twitter. She resigned as a member of the Labour Party in 2016, due to its delay in concluding the disciplinary process of Ken Livingstone after he referred to Nazi leader Adolf Hitler "supporting Zionism" during his early years in power.

In February 2019, Oberman and Rachel Riley instructed a lawyer to take action against 70 individuals for tweets which they perceived to be either libellous or tantamount to harassment, related to their campaign against allegations of antisemitism in the Labour party. As a result, Riley and Oberman sued a person who had retweeted a link to an article which had accused Oberman and Riley of harassing a young Labour activist who had commented on accusations of antisemitism in the Labour Party. In May 2019, a High Court judge ruled that the article that was linked in the tweet 'was capable of being defamatory'. In July 2020, Riley and Oberman dropped their joint libel suit and contributed towards the defendant's legal costs.

In late April 2019, Oberman was one of over 100 celebrities who signed a statement against a campaign advocating the boycotting of the 2019 Eurovision Song Contest which was held that year in Israel. In December 2019, Oberman spoke at a rally held by Campaign Against Antisemitism in Parliament Square, calling for solidarity with British Jews.

On 4 April 2021, Oberman accused politician and academic Philip Proudfoot of antisemitism, claiming he had a Twitter "Jew Blocklist". On 26 April 2022, she issued a statement apologising for her inaccurate and "hurtful comments", noting that she would pay "substantial damages" to Proudfoot, along with his legal costs, following a libel suit.

In November 2023, Oberman joined a march against antisemitism in London.

== Personal life ==
Oberman is Jewish, and has said that "Surprisingly, to me, it all came back to being Jewish. I say surprisingly because I spent most of my 20s and early 30s on a path that took me far from my religion". In December 2004, she married Rob Cowan. In August 2006, she gave birth to their daughter.

Oberman was appointed Member of the Order of the British Empire (MBE) in the 2025 Birthday Honours for services to Holocaust education and combating antisemitism.

Oberman's second cousin, through their grandmothers, is TV presenter Claudia Winkleman.

== Awards ==
Year	Group	Award	Won	Film/Television series
1998	BBC 3 Awards	Comedy writing	Won	Harringham Harker
2004	National Television Awards	Most Popular Newcomer	Nominated	EastEnders
2004	The British Soap Awards	Best Newcomer	Nominated	EastEnders
2005	The British Soap Awards	Villain of the Year	Nominated	EastEnders
2005	The British Soap Awards	Best Storyline	Won	EastEnders
2005	Inside Soap Awards	Best Actress	Nominated	EastEnders
2005	Inside Soap Awards	Best Bitch	Nominated	EastEnders
2005	The British Soap Awards	Best Dressed Star	Won	EastEnders
2006	The British Soap Awards	Soap Bitch of the Year	Nominated	EastEnders

== Credits ==
=== Theatre ===
Year	Title	Role	Theatre
1993	Tamburlaine	Olympia	Royal Shakespeare Company
1993	The Changeling	Diaphanta	Royal Shakespeare Company
1993	A Jovial Crew	Joan Cope	Royal Shakespeare Company
1993	The Beggar's Opera	Molly Brazen	Royal Shakespeare Company
1993–1994	Macbeth	Third Witch	Royal Shakespeare Company
1994	A Christmas Carol	Belle	Royal Shakespeare Company
1995	Love for Love	Angelica	New End Theatre, Hampstead
1998	Loot	Faye	Vaudeville Theatre
1999	Waiting for Lefty	Florence	National Theatre
2001	School Play	Miss Fry	Soho Theatre
2003	Edmond	Wife	Royal National Theatre
2003	Hello and Goodbye	Hester	Southwark Playhouse
2007	The Oak Tree	N/A	Soho Theatre
2007–2008	Boeing-Boeing	Gretchen	West End, London
2008	On the Rocks	Frieda Lawrence	Hampstead Theatre, London
2011	Absurd Person Singular	Eva Jackson	Curve, Leicester
2011	Earthquakes in London	Sarah Sullivan	National tour
2012	Old Money	Fiona	Hampstead Theatre, London
2015	McQueen	Isabella Blow	St. James Theatre, London
2017	Fiddler on the Roof	Golde	Chichester Festival Theatre, Chichester
2018	Present Laughter	Monica Reed	Chichester Festival Theatre, Chichester
2018	Pack of Lies	Helen Kroger	Menier Chocolate Factory, London
2021	The Windsors: Endgame	Camilla	Prince of Wales Theatre, London
2022	Noises Off	Belinda Blair	National tour
2023	The Merchant of Venice 1936	Shylock	National tour

=== Radio and audio ===
Year	Title	Role	Notes	Production
1997	Man in the Elephant Mask		Play	BBC Radio 4
1998–2001	The Way It Is	Lolly Swain	Serial	BBC Radio 4
1999–2000	Sean Lock: 15 Storeys High		Serial	BBC Radio 4
1999–2002	The Attractive Young Rabbi	Su Jacobs	Serial	BBC Radio 4
1999–2004	The Sunday Format		Serial	BBC Radio 4
2000	The Grass Is Singing		3 episodes	BBC Radio 4
2001–2003	Getting Nowhere Fast	Chantal	Serial	BBC Radio 4
2002	Tango Sensations		Play	BBC Radio 4
2003	Rigor Mortis	Dr. Ruth Anderson	Play	BBC Radio 4
2009	Shirleymander	Leader (Dame Shirley Porter)	Play	BBC Radio 4
2010	Bette and Joan and Baby Jane	Joan Crawford (& writer)	Play	BBC Radio 4
2010	Pat and Margaret	Pat	Comedy drama	BBC Radio 4
2012	Rock and Doris and Elizabeth	Elizabeth Taylor (& writer)		BBC Radio 4
2014	A Christmas Carol	Mrs. Fezziwig	Performance	
2015–present	Torchwood	Yvonne Hartman	Sci-fi drama	Big Finish Productions

=== Television ===
Year	Title	Role	Notes	Production
1997	Loved by You	Jenny / Jill	Series 1; Episodes 2 & 4 : "Out of the Past" and "I'm Just So Happy for You"	Carlton
1997–1998	Casualty	Zoe Garrard	Series 12; Episodes 16, 21 & 22	BBC
1998	Comedy Nation	Various roles	Performer / writer	BBC
1998	Kiss Me Kate	Julia	Series 1; Episode 2: "Mike"	BBC
1998	In the Red	Barmaid	Mini-series; Episode 3	BBC
2000	The Strangerers	Santina, Motorcycle Cop	Episode 5: "Zap Type 'Z'"	Sky TV
2000	The Way It Is	Lolly Swain	Television film	BBC
2000	Rhona	Kimbo	Episode 4: "The Happy Jeans"	BBC
2000	The Bill	Helen Jenson	Series 16; Episodes 60 & 61: "First Impressions" (Parts 1 & 2)	Thames Television
2000–2001	Bob Martin	Beverely Jordan	Series 1 & 2; 10 episodes	Granada
2001	Cow	Narrator	Television film	Century Films / Channel 4
2001	Starhunter	Zelda	Series 1; Episode 16: "Super Max"	Starhunter Productions
2001	Happiness	Julia Jacobs	Series 1; Episode 2: "I'm Doing It for Me"	BBC
2001	Slightly Filthy Show	Various roles	Episodes 1–4	London Weekend Television
2001	A Small Summer Party	Marion	Television film	BBC
2002	Big Train	Various roles	Series 2; Episodes 1–6	Talkback Productions
2002	15 Storeys High	Jill, Vince's ex-girlfriend	Series 1, Episode 6: "Dead Swan"	Talkback Productions
2003	The Harringham Harker	Diedra Portland	Television film	BBC
2003	Where the Heart Is	Sylvia Enwright	Episode 8: "Mister and Missus"	ITV
2003	Lenny Henry in Pieces	Various roles	Series 2; Episode 2	BBC
2004	The Last Detective	Mandy	Series 2; Episode 2: "The Long Bank Holiday"	ITV
2004	Doctors	Lynne Preston	Series 6; Episode 1: "Two's Company"	BBC
2004	Murder in Suburbia	Chloe Walters	Series 1; Episode 6: "Noisy Neighbours"	ITV
2004–2005, 2024–2026	EastEnders	Chrissie Watts	Series regular	BBC
2005	Bromwell High	Melanie Dickson / Various (voice)	Episodes 1–13	Channel 4
2006	Sorted	Amy	Episodes 1–6	BBC
2006	Doctor Who	Yvonne Hartman	Series 2; Episodes 12 & 13: "Army of Ghosts" and "Doomsday"	BBC
2007–2008	Chop Socky Chooks	Various (voice)	17 episodes	Cartoon Network / Teletoon
2008	Summerhill	Alice Ford	Television film	BBC
2009	Mistresses	Henrietta Swift	Series 2; Episode 5	BBC
2009	Robin Hood	Gweneth	Series 3; Episode 11: "The Enemy of My Enemy"	BBC
2009	Doctors	Cathy Harley	Series 11; Episode 113: "The Black Widow"	BBC
2010	Tracy Beaker Returns	Terrie Fender	Series 1; Episode 9: "Good Luck Boy"	BBC
2010	Comedy Lab	Michelle	Series 11; Episode 5: "Filth"	Room 5 / Channel 4
2010–2011	M.I. High	Grand Mistress / Anita Kane	Series 4; Episode 2: "The Bunny Whisperer" and Series 5; Episode 2: "The B Team"	BBC
2011	Dick and Dom's Funny Business	Herself - Special Guest	Episode 4: "Bills, Bills, Bills with Tracy-Ann Oberman"	BBC
2011	Sadie J	Tamara	Series 1; Episode 5: "Tidylicious"	BBC
2011	Waterloo Road	Alison Drew	Series 7; Episode 10	BBC
2011–2020	Friday Night Dinner	'Auntie' Val Lewis	Recurring role. Series 1–6; 14 episodes	Channel 4
2012	Jewish Mum of the Year	Herself - Host & Judge	Episodes 1–4	Channel 4
2012	The Best of Men	Else Guttman	Television film	BBC One
2012	Monroe	Lizzie Clapham	Series 2; Episodes 1–6	Mammoth Screen / ITV
2012	The Cat in the Hat Knows a Lot About That!	Astronaut Audrey / Gorilla Mum (voice)	Series 2; 4 episodes (UK version)	PBS / CITV
2012–2015	Toast of London	Mrs. Purchase	Series 1–3; 8 episodes	Channel 4
2013	Pramface	Bobby, Call Centre Boss	Series 2; Episode 3: "Supermum and Hardguy 2000"	BBC Three
2014	Father Brown	Audrey MacMurray	Series 2, Episode 10: "The Laws of Motion"	BBC One
2014	Comedy Playhouse	Faith	Series 16; Episode 1: "Over to Bill"	BBC One
2014	Siblings	Annette Walker	Series 1, Episode 1: "Wheelchair Conference"	BBC Three
2014	Give Out Girls	Debbie	4 episodes	Sky One
2014–2015	New Tricks	Fiona Kennedy	Series 11 & 12; 9 episodes	BBC One
2015	Crims	Governor Riley	Series 1, Episodes 4 & 6: "Day Seventy-Three" and "Day Ninety-Eight"	BBC Three
2015	SunTrap	Beverly	Episode 2: "In the Line of Fire"	Happy Tramp / BBC
2015	Brotherhood	Terri	Episode 7: "Work"	Comedy Central
2016	Would I Lie to You?	Herself - Panellist	Series 10; Episode 6	BBC One
2016	Hoff the Record	Crystal Hasselhoff	Series 2; Episode 1: "Death Hoax"	Dave
2016–2018	Tracey Ullman's Show	Various	Series 1–3; 7 episodes	BBC One and HBO
2016–2020	Thomas & Friends	Daisy (UK & US voice)	Series 20–24, succeeding Teresa Gallagher	HIT Entertainment
2016–2021	Escape to the Chateau	Herself - Narrator	Series 1–8; 42 episodes	Channel 4
2017	Tracey Breaks the News	Various	Series 1; 3 episodes	BBC One
2018	The Keith & Paddy Picture Show	Shop Assistant 2	Series 2; Episode 3: "Pretty Woman"	ITV
2018	Zapped	Cassandra	Series 3; Episode 5: "Book"	Baby Cow / BBC
2019	Dad's Army: The Lost Episodes	Mrs. Mavis Pike	Mini-series; Episode 3: "Under Fire"	UKTV original
2019	Plebs	Clodia	Series 5; Episode 3: "The Banquet"	ITV
2019–2022	After Life	Rebecca	Recurring role. Series 1–3; 5 episodes	Netflix
2020	Grantchester	Sister Grace	Series 5; Episode 6	ITV
2020	Dun Breedin'	Gigi Gordon	Mini-series; Episodes 1–9	Blonde to Black Pictures Two
2020–2022	Code 404	Helen Chalmers	Series 1–3; 11 episodes	Sky One
2021	It's a Sin	Carol Carter	Mini-series; Episodes 1, 3 & 5	Channel 4
2021	The Holden Girls: Mandy & Myrtle	Narrator (voice)	Episodes 1–4	E4
2021	Ridley Road	Nancy Malinovsky	Episodes 1–4	BBC One
2021	Sandylands	Donna Vegas	Series 2; Episodes 1–3	King Bert / UKTV Gold
2021	Midsomer Murders	Sally Ann Barker	Series 22; Episode 6: "The Witches of Angel's Rise"	ITV
2022	The Great Celebrity Bake Off for SU2C	Herself	Series 5; 1 episode	Channel 4
2022	Toast of London	Mrs. Purchase	Series 4; Episode 1: "Anger Man"	Objective / BBC Two
2022	Shakespeare & Hathaway: Private Investigators	Cordelia Shakespeare	Series 4, Episode 5: "Hunger for Bread"	BBC One
2022	The Walk-In	Deputy Chief Magistrate Arbuthnot	Mini-series; Episode 2	ITV
2023	The Witcher	Queen Hedwig	Series 3; Episodes 1 & 2: "Shaerrawedd" and "Unbound"	Netflix
2025	The Sandman	Lennie (cab driver)	Series 2; Episode 12: ""Death: The High Cost of Living"	Netflix
2025	Play for Today	Amanda	Episode: "Never Too Late"	5
2026	Run Away	Jessica Kinberg	Miniseries	Netflix

=== Film ===
Year	Title	Role	Director	Production
1999	Faeries	Tippycott (voice)	Gary Hurst	HIT Entertainment / United Productions
2003	SuperTex	Lea Van Gelder	Jan Schutte	Halebob Film
2003	The Early Days (short)	Ursula	Chris Stevenson	Channel 4 Films / Shine
2010	The Infidel	Julie Cohen	Josh Appignanesi	Solly Film / MetFilm
2011	The Great Ghost Rescue	Mrs. Burnley	Yann Samuell	Good Films Collective / Lipsync Productions
2011	Cleaning Up (short)	Jenny	Thomas Guerrier	Big Finish Productions / Dead Dog Films
2013	Filth	Diana	Jon S. Baird	Steel Mill Pictures / Logie Pictures
2013	The Funeral (short)	Susan Cowan	Nick Green	Loose Moose Productions / EOM Films / Viva Films
2014	Casanova Variations	Jessica	Michael Sturminger	Alfama Films
2014	Moomins on the Riviera	Moominmamma (voice)	Xavier Picard, Hanna Hemilä	Handle Productions / Pictak
2014	Geoffrey's Belt (short)	Jennifer	Tom Bacon	iBlade Films
2014	Hector and the Search for Happiness	Pathetic Jane	Peter Chelsom	Egoli Tossel Pictures / Film Afrika Worldwide
2017	Call Me Alvy (short)	Judith Silver	Alexei Slater	Turn The Slate Productions
2019	The Bris of Michael Moshe Solomon (short)	Susan	Coral Amiga	Parkville Pictures
2022	Night of the Broken (short)	Gertrude Rosen	Dan Turner	K Films
2023	Diane from Accounts (short)	Tara	Emily Seale-Jones	CPL Productions

=== Video games ===
Year	Title	Role	Notes	Source
2015	Final Fantasy XIV: Heavensward	Merlwyb Bloefhiswyn	Played by Jean Gilpin in Final Fantasy XIV and Final Fantasy XIV: A Realm Reborn	
2017	Final Fantasy XIV: Stormblood	Merlwyb Bloefhiswyn	Played by Jean Gilpin in Final Fantasy XIV and Final Fantasy XIV: A Realm Reborn	
2019	Final Fantasy XIV: Shadowbringers	Merlwyb Bloefhiswyn	Played by Jean Gilpin in Final Fantasy XIV and Final Fantasy XIV: A Realm Reborn	

=== Writing ===
Year	Title	Format	Notes	Production
1995–1996	News Review	Radio series	Writer and performer	BBC
1997	Comedy Nation	Radio series	Writer and performer	BBC
1998–2000	Harringham Harker	Radio series	Writer and performer	BBC
2008	Three Sisters on Hope Street	Theatrical play	Writer	The Everyman, Liverpool / Hampstead, London
2010	Bette and Joan and Baby Jane	Radio play	Writer	BBC
