= Simon Evans (comedian) =

British comedian

- Born: 9 May 1965 (age 61); Luton, Bedfordshire, England
- Education: University of Southampton
- Children: 2

Comedy career
- Medium: Stand-up, Television, Radio
- Genres: Observational comedy, Black comedy, Satire
- Subjects: Everyday life, Family, Marriage, Human interaction, Current events
- Website: www.thesimonevans.com

Simon Evans (born 9 May 1965) is an English comedian and writer.

== Early life ==
Evans was born in Luton. He attended Verulam School in St Albans, and then studied law at the University of Southampton, graduating in 1986. In 2018, he learned that his biological father was the prolific sperm donor Bertold Wiesner.

== Career ==
He has performed one-man shows at the Edinburgh Festival Fringe since 2000 and at the New Zealand Comedy Festival 2002, Cape Town Comedy Festival 2001 as well as in Hong Kong, Singapore, Shanghai, Beijing, Winnipeg and Dubai. In July 2004 he performed at the Just for Laughs festival in Montreal, and the following spring at the Aspen Comedy Festival in Colorado. Since July 2010 when he appeared alongside Emo Philips at Latitude Festival in Suffolk he has returned to Latitude on several occasions.

In early 2010 Evans supported Lee Mack on his UK tour Going Out. As a writer, Evans has made a long-running contribution to Mack's BBC sitcom Not Going Out.

He toured his shows Fringe Magnet in 2010–11, Friendly Fire 2012–2013, then Leashed from August 2014.

In 2014, Evans voiced Old Speckled Henry the fox in an advertising campaign for Old Speckled Hen beer.

From 2017 to 2019 Evans toured his show Genius, which then became Genius 2.0. This was described in The Scotsman in a five star review by Kate Copstick as an "extraordinarily accomplished hour… a masterclass in socio-political comedy". and which also garnered several other four-star reviews.

From 2019 to 2023 he toured his show Work of the Devil, in which he shared the revelation concerning his parentage. From 2023 to 2025, Evans toured his show Have We Met?

His show Staring at the Sun was touring in 2026.

Evans had a BBC Radio 4 series Simon Evans Goes to Market, and numerous other radio and TV appearances. He has appeared twice on Live at the Apollo and was a weekly regular on Stand Up for the Week (Autumn 2013, Channel 4). TV appearances have also included Michael McIntyre's Comedy Roadshow in Sunderland (BBC One, 2010) and Edinburgh Comedy Fest Live (BBC Three, 2010).

In early 2018, after an appearance on BBC Radio 4's The News Quiz, Evans was referred to by Rod Liddle in The Spectator as a right-wing comedian.

Evans is also a regular columnist for the British Internet magazine Spiked. and has also written for UnHerd, The Spectator, Quillette and The Daily Telegraph.

== Television writing ==
Evans has written for TV shows including:

- The Big Breakfast
- Lily Savage
- Johnny Vaughan Tonight
- Look at the State We're In
- TV Heaven, Telly Hell
- The Late Edition
- They Think It's All Over
- Revolver
- 8 Out of 10 Cats
- Turn Back Time
- Not Going Out

== Television appearances ==
Evans has appeared on The Comedy Store (Five) and The Stand Up Show (BBC1). Evans's other television include shows on the Comedy Network, and appearances on Five's Company (Five), and as a contestant on The Krypton Factor where he was disqualified for not completing one stage of the Super Round.

- Brain Candy (BBC Choice) (2002)
- The Way It Is (BBC1) (2000)
- Edinburgh Nights (BBC2)
- The Comedy Store (Five)
- The Stand Up Show (BBC1)
- Gas (Channel 4)
- Life's a Pitch (BBC1) (2000)
- The Comedy Network (Five)
- Five's Company (Five)
- Take a Girl Like You (2000)
- Rich Hall's Cattle Drive (2006) as Melvin Turpin
- Michael McIntyre's Comedy Roadshow (BBC1) (2010)
- Dave's One Night Stand (Dave) (2011)
- Mock the Week (BBC2) (2011)
- Dara Ó Briain: School of Hard Sums (Dave) (2012)
- Live at the Apollo (BBC1) (2013) (2014)
- The Big Questions (BBC1) (21 January 2018)
- Question Time (BBC1) (2 May 2019)
- Headliners (GB News) (2021)

== Radio ==
Evans appears regularly on BBC Radio 4 – hosting and writing seven series of the spoof news show The Way It Is (as Richard Richard), as well as appearing on numerous panel games including The News Quiz, Armando Iannucci's Charm Offensive and The Unbelievable Truth, and discussion programmes such as Off the Page.

He is a regular contributor to both BBC Radio 4 and London Live and has had full-length comedy scripts commissioned by the BBC for both TV and radio.

- The Way It Is (Radio 4) – Writer and performer
- Best Policy (Radio 4) – Anchored
- True Lies, A world without... and others (Radio 4) – Pundit/panellist
- Beating the System (Radio 4) – Sole writer and performer
- Troublestarter (Radio 4) – Three part series – Sole writer and performer
- The Mighty Boosh (Radio 4) – Performer
- The News Quiz (Radio 4) – Performer
- The Big Booth (Radio 4) – Performer
- Simon Evans Goes To Market (Radio 4)
