= Kindertransport (play) =

1993 play by Diane Samuels

- Written by: Diane Samuels
- Original language: English
- Setting: Europe

Premiere
- Date premiered: 13 April 1993 (33 years ago)
- Place premiered: Soho Theatre Company at the Cockpit Theatre, Marylebone, in London, England, U.K.

Kindertransport is a play by Diane Samuels, which examines the life, during World War II and afterwards, of a Kindertransport child. Though fictitious, it is based upon many real kindertransport stories. The playscript is published by Nick Hern Books.

== Synopsis ==
In November 1938, after nights of violence against Jews across Germany and Austria, the British government introduced a programme called the Kindertransport (children's transport), which gave Jewish children—and only children—safe passage to the UK. Spared the horrors of the death camps, the Jewish children were uprooted, separated from their parents and transported to a different culture where they faced, not the unmitigated horror of the death camps, but a very human mixture of kindness, indifference, occasional exploitation, and the relationships between the ordinary people faced with helpless children.

Eva Schlesinger, daughter of Helga and Werner, is sent away to temporarily live with a foster carer in Manchester, England, until her parents find work and move to England too. She lives with Lil, a woman who has two other children (Nora and Margaret) and is married to Jack. Lil allows Eva to smoke when she meets her which shows how Lil is not a proper guardian for Eva at first. Eva and Lil fall out as Eva skips her English lessons to go and ask round rich houses if they will give her parents jobs; Lil thinks this makes her seem desperate. She is unhappy and misses her mother. Eva and Lil both eventually become at peace with one another and get on well; Eva is shown as gradually losing her Jewish roots.

One day Helga arrives when Eva is in her late teens and Eva tells Helga that Lil and Jack have adopted her and she has been naturalised as English, and her name is now Evelyn. Helga is offended and upset that Evelyn will not travel to New York with her to stay with family. Helga tells Evelyn her father is dead. They have an argument and Helga leaves, which is then followed by an imaginary vicious, angry argument between Helga and Evelyn in which Evelyn gets out all of her hatred for Helga, and she proclaims that Helga IS the Ratcatcher, a character constantly present in the play. At the same time in the present, Evelyn's daughter Faith is uncovering her mother's secret past and they have an argument, which eventually comes to rest. All of this takes place in the attic of Evelyn's house, which supposedly represents Evelyn's psyche.

== Noteworthy productions ==
Kindertransport was first performed in the UK by the Soho Theatre Company at the Cockpit Theatre, Marylebone, in London on 13 April 1993 and in the US at the Manhattan Theatre Club in New York on 26 April 1994. Subsequently, the play has been produced in San Francisco with awards, Sweden, Japan, Germany, Austria, Canada and South Africa. It was adapted by the author for a BBC Radio 4 production in 1995.

It has also been performed in Manchester, where the play is set, at the Opera House. The play enjoyed a season in London's West End, playing at the Vaudeville Theatre from 9 September to 30 November 1996.
