= Easy A =

2010 film by Will Gluck

- Theatrical release poster
- Directed by: Will Gluck
- Written by: Bert V. Royal
- Produced by: Zanne Devine; Will Gluck
- Starring: Emma Stone; Penn Badgley; Amanda Bynes; Thomas Haden Church; Patricia Clarkson; Cam Gigandet; Lisa Kudrow; Malcolm McDowell; Aly Michalka; Stanley Tucci
- Cinematography: Michael Grady
- Edited by: Susan Littenberg
- Music by: Brad Segal
- Production companies: Screen Gems; Olive Bridge Entertainment
- Distributed by: Sony Pictures Releasing
- Release dates: September 11, 2010 (TIFF); September 17, 2010 (United States)
- Running time: 92 minutes
- Country: United States
- Language: English
- Budget: $8 million
- Box office: $75 million

Easy A (stylized as easy A) is a 2010 American teen romantic comedy film directed by Will Gluck, written by Bert V. Royal, and starring Emma Stone, Penn Badgley, Amanda Bynes, Thomas Haden Church, Patricia Clarkson, Cam Gigandet, Lisa Kudrow, Malcolm McDowell, Aly Michalka, and Stanley Tucci. The screenplay was partially inspired by the 1850 novel The Scarlet Letter by Nathaniel Hawthorne.

Shot in Ojai, California, the film premiered at the Toronto International Film Festival on September 11, 2010 and was released on September 17, 2010 by Sony Pictures Releasing. The film received positive reviews with high praise for Stone's performance, and was a major financial success, grossing $75 million worldwide against a budget of $8 million. Stone received a Golden Globe nomination for Best Actress in a Comedy or Musical, while the movie won the Critics' Choice Award for Best Comedy. The film is ranked as number 14 on Entertainment Weekly's 2021 list of the Best High School Movies. Easy A is also Bynes’ final performance to date.

== Plot ==
The story is narrated by Olive Penderghast, a 17-year-old high school student living in Ojai, California, speaking into her webcam. Desperate to avoid going on a camping trip with her best friend Rhiannon Abernathy and Rhiannon's hippie parents, Olive dishonestly claims she is going on a date with a college boy that weekend; truthfully, she stays home all weekend listening to "Pocketful of Sunshine" from a musical greeting card her grandmother sent her. Pressed by Rhiannon the following Monday, Olive eventually lies about having lost her virginity to her fictional date. Prudish, devout Christian student Marianne Bryant overhears their conversation, and Olive's story soon spreads throughout the school. The school's church group, run by Marianne, decides to "save" Olive from her supposed promiscuity. Olive confides the truth to her classmate Brandon, a gay student who is bullied for his sexual orientation. She agrees to serve as his "beard" and pretend to have sex with him at a teen party so people will believe he is straight.

After a fight with Rhiannon, Olive decides to embrace her new reputation as a "tramp" and begins to dress more provocatively. She stitches a red "A" onto her clothes, inspired by Hester Prynne from Nathaniel Hawthorne's 1850 novel The Scarlet Letter, which she has been reading in English class. Boys who have had no previous luck with girls beg Olive to increase their popularity by letting them claim they have had sex with her, which she does in exchange for gift cards to various stores. Marianne's ex-boyfriend Micah contracts chlamydia from having sex with the school guidance counselor, Mrs. Griffith, but claims Olive was the one who gave it to him. Because Mrs. Griffith's husband, Mr. Griffith, is Olive's favorite teacher, she accepts the blame to spare their marriage.

The church youth group, now including Rhiannon, begins harassing Olive in an attempt to get her to drop out of school. She goes on a date with Rhiannon's crush, Anson, which ends with her storming off angrily after he tries bribing her to actually have sex with him and not just claim that she did. Olive reconnects with Todd, her childhood crush and the school mascot, who says he does not believe the rumors because she lied for him when he was not ready for his first kiss years ago. She asks everyone who paid her to admit the truth, but nobody is willing to relinquish their newfound reputations. When Mrs. Griffith refuses to admit to her affair with Micah, Olive threatens to expose her; Mrs. Griffith says no one would believe her. Olive immediately informs Mr. Griffith, who subsequently separates from his wife.

After talking with her mother, Olive comes up with a plan – she performs a song-and-dance number at a pep rally to draw people's attention and tells them to watch her webcast that night, promising an online sex show with Todd. In actuality, Olive uses the webcast to explain the truth of what happened, which has served as the frame story for the film. As Olive is concluding her webcast, Todd comes by her house riding a lawnmower. She signs off by saying that she may lose her virginity to him eventually, but whether she does or not is "nobody's goddamn business". Olive texts a tearful Rhiannon and apologizes for lying to her. She goes outside to meet Todd, and they kiss before riding off on the lawn mower.

== Cast ==
- Emma Stone as Olive Penderghast
  - Juliette Goglia as young Olive
- Penn Badgley as "Woodchuck/Lobster" Todd
  - Braeden Lemasters as young Todd
- Amanda Bynes as Marianne Bryant
- Dan Byrd as Brandon
- Aly Michalka as Rhiannon Abernathy
- Thomas Haden Church as Mr. Griffith
- Lisa Kudrow as Mrs. Griffith
- Patricia Clarkson as Rosemary Penderghast
- Stanley Tucci as Dill Penderghast
- Cam Gigandet as Micah
- Malcolm McDowell as Principal Gibbons
- Mahaley Patel as Nina Howell
- Jake Sandvig as Anson
- Bryce Clyde Jenkins as Chip Penderghast
- Johanna Braddy as Melody Bostic
- Fred Armisen as Pastor Bryant
- Stacey Travis as Mrs. Bryant
- Max Crumm as Pontius
- Yoshi Sudarso as Eric Ling
- Lalaine as Gossipy Girl

== Production ==
=== Development ===
Screenwriter Bert V. Royal claims to have written the entire screenplay, except for the last ten pages, in five days. Royal's plan was to adapt three classic works into films and to set them at the same high school, so that some characters would appear in multiple films. Besides The Scarlet Letter, which was the source material for Easy A, Royal wanted to adapt Cyrano de Bergerac and The Mystery of Edwin Drood. Natasha Bedingfield's song "Pocketful of Sunshine", which becomes a running joke in the film, was not in Royal's original script. He envisioned "Olive", a track from Ken Nordine's 1966 album Colors, to play during Olive's weekend montage (which introduces the song). Director Will Gluck's favorite film is Ferris Bueller's Day Off and has multiple homages to it in the film (Olive's shower Mohawk, "never had one lesson"), among many other John Hughes references. According to Royal, although the word "fuck" appeared 47 times in the original draft, which was written as an R-rated comedy, all occurrences were cut from the final film. Gluck shot other versions of many scenes, with or without coarse language. Although the film was cut down for a wider audience, it still obtained a 15 rating in the United Kingdom.

Jennifer Lawrence auditioned for the role of Olive.

=== Filming ===
Gluck credits Emma Stone with improvising the line about being a "Gossip Girl in the Sweet Valley of Traveling Pants". The entire film was shot in Ojai, California in the summer of 2009, using Panavision's Genesis and later filmized. Not a single film set was used; even the houses in the film belong to Ojai residents. The school used as "Ojai North High School" in the film is Nordhoff High School, and the end credits are filmed on Fordyce Road, both located in Ojai, California.

== Soundtrack ==
The soundtrack was released by Madison Gate Records on September 14, 2010, and is available via iTunes. It features tracks from Jessie J, Lenka, Natasha Bedingfield, Kardinal Offishall, and Cary Brothers. Other songs in the film but not on the soundtrack album are from OneRepublic, Angus & Julia Stone, The Dollyrots, Death Cab for Cutie, and The Pussycat Dolls.

Easy A (Original Motion Picture Soundtrack)

Soundtrack album by Various Artists
- Released: September 14, 2010
- Genres: Pop, hip hop, rock, punk rock, new wave
- Label: Madison Gate Records

No.	Title	Music	Length
1.	"Change of Seasons"	Sweet Thing	3:46
2.	"Bad Before Good"	Day One	3:50
3.	"Trouble Is a Friend"	Lenka	3:37
4.	"If You Were Here"	Cary Brothers	3:49
5.	"15 Minutes"	The Yeah You's	3:30
6.	"Cupid Shoot Me"	Remi Nicole	3:43
7.	"Satellite"	Kram	3:06
8.	"Don't You (Forget About Me)"	AM	4:23
9.	"We Go Together"	I Heart Homework	3:17
10.	"Numba 1 (Tide Is High)"	Kardinal Offishall	3:42
11.	"Perfect Picture"	Carlos Bertonatti	3:06
12.	"The Wolf"	Miniature Tigers	2:35
13.	"Sexy Silk"	Jessie J	2:43
14.	"When Life Gives Me Lemons I Make Lemonade"	The Boy Least Likely To	3:42
15.	"Pocketful of Sunshine"	Natasha Bedingfield	3:24
16.	"Don't You (Forget About Me)"	Simple Minds	4:23

== Release ==
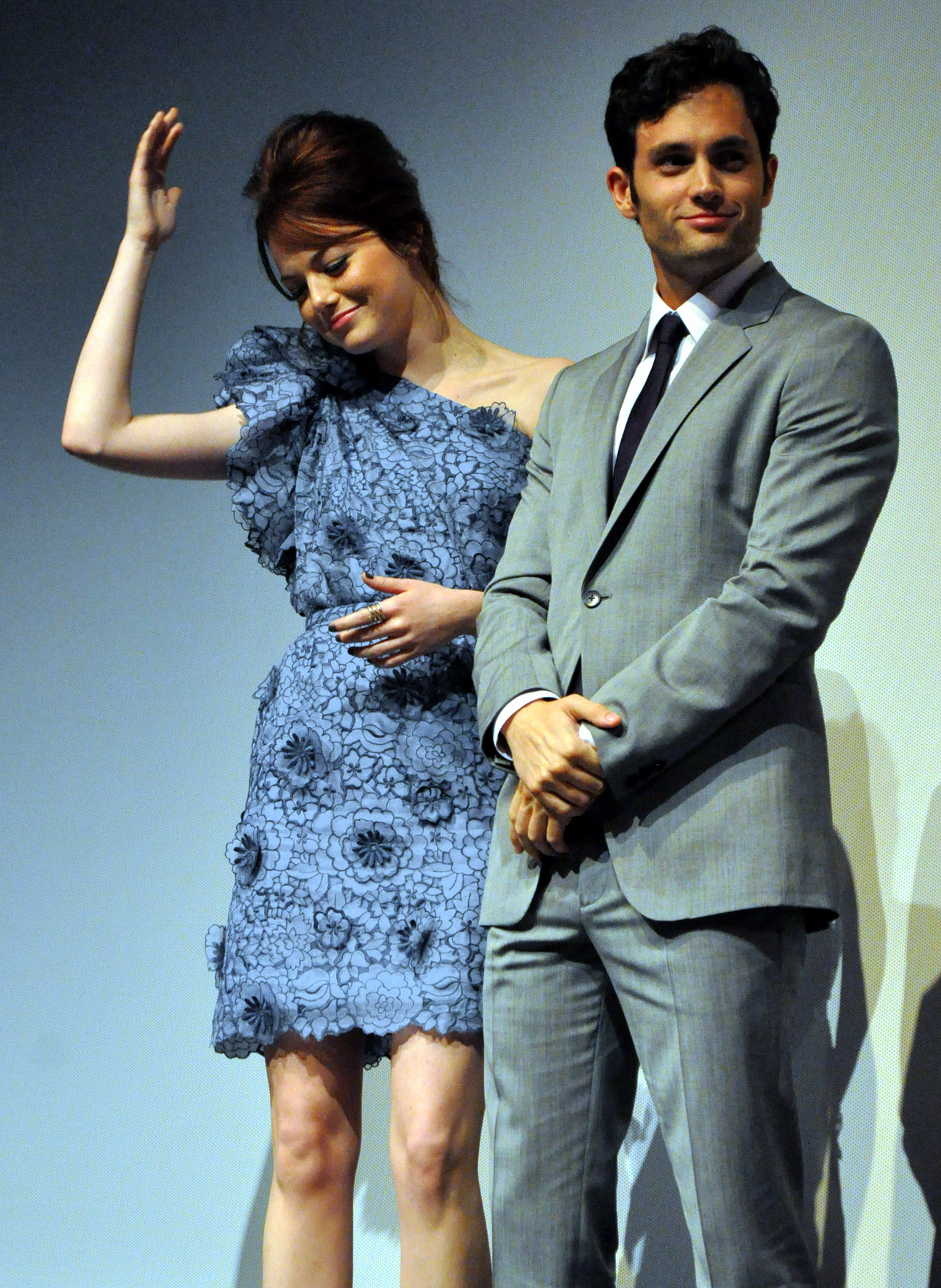
Emma Stone and Penn Badgley at the film's Toronto premiere

Easy A had its world premiere at the 2010 Toronto International Film Festival.

=== Home media ===
Easy A was released on DVD and Blu-ray Disc on December 21, 2010. The DVD features a gag reel, Emma Stone's audition footage, an audio commentary with director Gluck and Stone, and previews. Blu-ray exclusive bonus features include: The Making of Easy A, The School of Pop Culture: Movies of the '80s, Vocabulary of Hilarity and a trivia track.

== Reception ==
=== Box office ===
The film opened on September 17, 2010, and grossed $6,787,163 on its opening day and $17,734,040 in its opening weekend, placing second behind The Town on both figures, and already making back more than double the film's slim $8 million budget. This was in line with expectations from Sony of an opening weekend take of around $15 million. The film grossed a total of $58,401,464 in the United States and Canada plus $16,624,752 in international markets for a worldwide total of $75,026,216, earning its budget back more than nine times, making it a huge financial success.

=== Critical response ===
On the review aggregator website Rotten Tomatoes, Easy A has an approval rating of 85% based on 192 reviews, with an average rating of 7.1/10. The site's critical consensus reads: "It owes a huge debt to older (and better) teen comedies, but Easy A proves a smart, witty showcase for its irresistibly charming star, Emma Stone." Another review aggregator, Metacritic, assigned the film a weighted average score of 72 out of 100, based on 35 critics, indicating "generally favorable" reviews. Audiences polled by CinemaScore gave it an average grade of A− on an A+ to F scale.

Chicago Sun-Times film critic Roger Ebert gave the film three and a half out of four stars, writing: "Easy A offers an intriguing middle ground to the absolute of sexual abstinence: Don't sleep with anybody, but say you did. It's a funny, engaging comedy that takes the familiar but underrated Emma Stone and makes her, I believe, a star." Richard Corliss of Time magazine named Stone's performance one of the ten best film performances of 2010: "Stone lends winning maturity and a gift for making sassy dialogue sound natural. This 22-year-old is an actress-personality — a star — around whom Hollywood could build some pretty good movies." John Griffiths from Us Weekly gave it two and a half stars out of four: "With her husky voice and fiery hair, Stone is spectacular, echoing early Lindsay Lohan...The story is thin, and the laughs meager."

The Independent praised Easy A for redefining tropes of teen films, particularly sex comedies. In a retrospective piece for The Washington Post, Anying Guo discussed its influence, pointing out how it subverted "sex-crazed tropes into a sharp, thoughtful film" by satirizing teens' obsession with virginity itself. Guo added: "Packed with references to “Say Anything” and other ’80s homages, the film felt refreshing against the steady churn of bildungsroman narratives that often centered on young men."

== Legacy ==
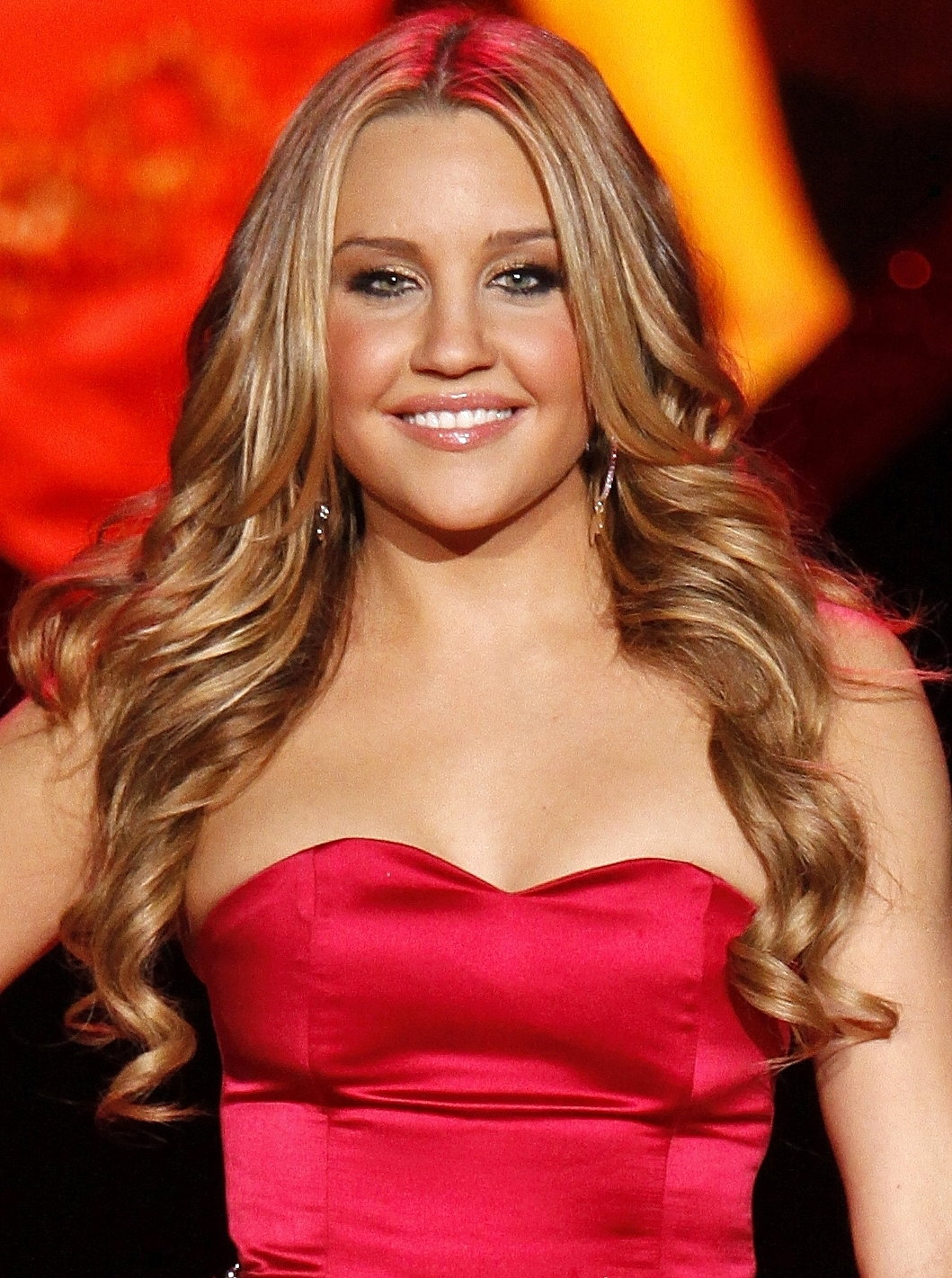
Easy A was star Amanda Bynes's last film role.

Since its release, Easy A has garnered a substantial cult following. Per The Independent's Isobel Lewis, its feminist themes and relatability have made it "progressive and timeless." Both Lewis and Marshall Shaffer of RogerEbert.com singled out Olive as a relatable character for teenagers, and Shaffer cited her as a blueprint for the teenage protagonists of films like 21 Jump Street and The Edge of Seventeen.

Easy A was Stone's first lead role. Already a rising star with film credits like Superbad and Zombieland, Easy A skyrocketed her to stardom and critical acclaim. She would go on to win two Academy Awards and star in films like The Amazing Spider-Man, La La Land, and Poor Things. Costar Patricia Clarkson called Stone "a force to be reckoned with from the moment we started shooting...[she] got this character down in one second, she was amazing. Stone discovered she had asthma while filming the fake-sex scenes, where she and Dan Byrd had to jump up and down on a bed for numerous takes. The film proved to be Amanda Bynes's final film role before her retirement and subsequent mental health struggles.

Upon its release, the film generated some controversy from religious viewers regarding its portrayal of Christians as one-dimensional judgmental hypocrites. Gluck later expressed regret regarding their portrayal, explaining "If there was one thing I could do over, that I'm mad at myself for, it's that character. I never wanted to make fun of or mock Evangelical Christians. I wanted to make fun of and mock zealots...if I could pull something back it would be the actual religion specific part of it." However, other platforms like The Christian Post appreciated the perspective, acknowledging that there are "people who call themselves Christians and yet appoint themselves the prosecutor, judge and jury to the world around them? Or the more subtle types that can condemn with just a look and spread gossip like wildfire under the category of "prayer requests"?"

== Accolades ==
Ceremony	Category	Recipients	Result
Artios Awards	Outstanding Achievement in Casting – Feature – Studio or Independent Comedy	Lisa Miller Katz	Nominated
The Comedy Awards	Best Comedy Film	Easy A	Nominated
The Comedy Awards	Best Comedy Actress	Emma Stone	Nominated
The Comedy Awards	Best Comedy Director	Will Gluck	Nominated
Critics' Choice Awards	Best Comedy Film	Easy A	Won
Dorian Awards	Unsung Film of the Year	Easy A	Won
EDA Awards	Actress Defying Age and Ageism	Patricia Clarkson	Nominated
Eddie Awards	Best Edited Feature Film – Comedy or Musical	Susan Littenberg	Nominated
Empire Awards	Best Comedy	Easy A	Nominated
GLAAD Media Awards	Outstanding Film – Wide Release	Easy A	Nominated
Golden Globe Awards	Best Actress in a Motion Picture – Musical or Comedy	Emma Stone	Nominated
Golden Schmoes Awards	Best Comedy of the Year	Easy A	Nominated
Golden Schmoes Awards	Biggest Surprise of the Year	Easy A	Nominated
Golden Schmoes Awards	Best Actress of the Year	Emma Stone	Nominated
Golden Schmoes Awards	Breakthrough Performance of the Year	Emma Stone	Nominated
MTV Movie Awards	Best Female Performance	Emma Stone	Nominated
MTV Movie Awards	Best Comedic Performance	Emma Stone	Won
MTV Movie Awards	Best Line from a Movie	Emma Stone and Amanda Bynes	Nominated
People's Choice Awards	Favorite Comedy Movie	Easy A	Nominated
Russian National Movie Awards	Best Foreign Comedy Movie	Easy A	Nominated
St. Louis Gateway Film Critics Association Awards	Best Comedy	Easy A	Nominated
St. Louis Gateway Film Critics Association Awards	Special Merit (for best scene, cinematic technique or other memorable aspect or moment)	For the John Hughes tribute near the beginning.	Nominated
Teen Choice Awards	Choice Movie: Romantic Comedy	Easy A	Won
Teen Choice Awards	Choice Movie Actor: Romantic Comedy	Penn Badgley	Nominated
Teen Choice Awards	Choice Movie Actress: Romantic Comedy	Emma Stone	Won
Teen Choice Awards	Choice Movie: Female Scene Stealer	Aly Michalka	Nominated

== Sequel/spin-off ==
It was announced on June 20, 2019, that a spin-off film of Easy A is in development, which would be written and directed by Bert V. Royal. Further confirmation of the film came in 2021, with Aly Michalka stating: "There are talks that there might be a sequel. That actually is semi real. ... It would be kind of like a new retelling but you'd see some of the characters from the original come back into the story."
