= 3 Sisters on Hope Street =

2008 play by Diane Samuels and Tracy-Ann Oberman

- Playscript cover
- Author: Diane Samuels and Tracy-Ann Oberman
- Language: English
- Series: NHB Modern Plays
- Genre: Play
- Set in: Liverpool, England
- Published: London
- Publisher: Nick Hern Books
- Publication date: 17 January 2008
- Publication place: United Kingdom
- Media type: Paperback
- Pages: 160
- ISBN: 9781854595768
- Website: Official site

3 Sisters on Hope Street
- Original language: English
- Written by: Diane Samuels and Tracy-Ann Oberman
- Characters: Gertie, May and Rita Lasky
- Genre: Play
- Setting: Liverpool's Jewish community in 1946-48

Premiere
- Date: 25 January 2008
- Place: Everyman Theatre, Liverpool, England
- Official website

3 Sisters on Hope Street is a 2008 British play by Diane Samuels and Tracy-Ann Oberman. The play is a reinterpretation of Chekhov's Three Sisters, transferring events to Liverpool after World War II and re-casting the Pozorov sisters as three Jewish Englishwomen. It opened on 25 January 2008 at the Everyman Theatre, which is located at Hope Street, Liverpool.

In an interview on BBC Radio 4's Woman's Hour, Oberman spoke of the original inspiration and long gestation of the play:

I had done The Three Sisters at drama school, where I played Mascha, and I was aware while I was doing the play of how funny I found it... [which] did not seem to be the general consensus. In my last year of drama school I went to the Moscow Arts Theatre School for a term, and whilst I was there I studied Chekhov... [and saw] a production of The Seagull that I found hilarious, and I was sort of sitting there in the home of Chekhov's birth and I realised that I had hit on something that I really felt in my bones... I loved The Three Sisters and I went back to read it while I was in Moscow and I was just struck by how similar it was to the family I grew up in.

Oberman described the work as "A kind of Three Sisters via Woody Allen", reflecting the humour she saw in Chekhov's story. She expanded upon this personal connection in an article for The Guardian: "Chekhov wrote about a world I recognised from my childhood – where intense pain is covered by bravura and humour, and where intense longing is masked by self-deprecation and wit. There was the same obsession with death, the same fierce familial loyalty, the same tendency toward melodrama – as well as a great passion for food." After returning from Moscow, Oberman continued to work on her reinterpretation for the next 15 years, but lacked the confidence to take her project further. However, after her success in EastEnders, she was offered "a lot of work" and was "in a position where I could green-light stuff for myself", determining that "this was the moment when I was going to make this dream happen".

A chance discussion with Diane Samuels in the back of a taxi one night led to the collaboration between the two. Oberman had had difficulty deciding where to transpose Chekhov's narrative, with Samuels offering up the idea of Liverpool, her home town, and the two agreeing on the post-war time frame: "Liverpudlians have their black sense of humour and comic timing, born out of having their city blown to smithereens during the war". This informed the new Jewish sensibility of the play which was anchored to the tone of Chekhov's original, where the melodrama of the Pozorov family masked the pain and social upheaval all about them. Oberman felt this echoed the way the Jewish community in Britain acted in the wake of the Holocaust: "people that close to the Second World War just didn't talk about it – a bit like the elephant in the room". The intent of the play was "to take a family who has the Holocaust hanging over them, and still have them laugh and moan and bicker while wondering what's for breakfast".

3 Sisters on Hope Street opened at the Everyman Theatre, Liverpool on 25 January 2008 before transferring, on 21 February, to the Hampstead Theatre in London.

The playscript is published by Nick Hern Books.

== Reception ==
The play was well reviewed, being described as "an inventive reimagining" and "a bold, fresh and fruitful reinterpretation", showcasing "lively and intelligent" writing. Philip Key in the Liverpool Daily Post praised the adaptation as successfully capturing the sensibility of Liverpool, enabling the story to "be familiar to both theatre-goers and many Liverpudlians." Peter Fisher of The British Theatre Guide was even more ecstatic, describing the production as a "superb project" and a "superb evening's entertainment".

However, other reviewers were more ambivalent, with Michael Coveney branding the play a "clever re-write" but poorly served by the actors involved. Similarly, The Guardian's theatre critic felt the piece to be "a surprisingly faithful transposition", which "ingeniously" solves some of the problems inherent in relocating the original, but objected to what he saw was a "dependence on authorial cleverness in finding post-war parallels to their source".
