= The Attractive Young Rabbi =

The Attractive Young Rabbi is a BBC Radio 4 comedy series of three series from 1999 to 2002, written by Barry Grossman. Starring Tracy-Ann Oberman, David de Keyser and Doreen Mantle, the series was about two rabbis in "Hillfield", in north west London. Oberman is Reform Rabbi Su Jacobs, the attractive young rabbi of the title, who clashes with de Keyser's Orthodox and very traditional Rabbi Abraham Fine, with Doreen Mantle as the latter's wife, Sadie, trying to keep the peace between them, and Henry Goodman and Jonathan Kydd as Melvin Livingstone and Brian Franks, chairmen of their respective synagogue councils.

The theme tune was written by Max Harris in klezmer style. The series has been frequently repeated on BBC 7, later BBC Radio 4 Extra, where it is described as a 'gentle comedy'.

== Episode list ==
=== Series One ===
1. The New Synagogue (aired 12 November 1999) – A single phone call turns Rabbi Fine's comfortable Jewish community upside down.
2. TV Stars (aired 19 November 1999) – With Rabbi Su set for the small-screen, Rabbi Abraham takes a different route.
3. The Visitor (aired 26 November 1999) – When an Israeli MP arrives, sex, politics and religion make it an awkward visit. Guest star Warren Mitchell.
4. The Engagement (aired 3 December 1999) – Rabbi Su's announcement sparks fury from her rival Abraham, because her fiancé turns out to be his grandson.

=== Series Two ===
1. The Bar Mitzvah (aired 22 September 2000) – Three rabbis at one party sparks a recipe for disaster.
2. Direct Action (aired 29 September 2000) – A man with a tape measure spells trouble for Rabbi Fine.
3. The Wedding (aired 6 October 2000) – Everyone's looking forward to Hillfield's big ceremony, but in which synagogue?
4. The Lift (aired 13 October 2000) – Rabbis Fine and Jacobs find themselves stuck in a lift together.
5. Brief Encounter (aired 20 October 2000) – Feeling snubbed over Rabbi Abraham's Royal invite, Rabbi Su finds a new boyfriend.
6. Babies (aired 27 October 2000) – The rabbis are submerged in baby talk, and Melvin struggles with his conscience.

=== Series Three ===
1. The Eager Young Student (aired 13 February 2002) – Young Mikhail discovers that it's not easy being a Jew.
2. A Woman's Work (aired 20 February 2002) – Happy Rabbi Su finds a role-model, but Rabbi Abraham would settle for a haircut.
3. Abraham's Brother (aired 27 February 2002) – A faded photograph and a private film show spell trouble for Rabbi Abraham.
4. Crime Wave (aired 6 March 2002) – It all begins with a disappearing car and a little old lady.
5. Mixed Fortunes (aired 13 March 2002) – Su's bringing Jeremy home to meet her parents doesn't turn out as expected, while Abraham has a newspaper interview.
6. A Very Nice Girl (aired 20 March 2002) – As Rabbi Abraham recovers from his collapse, Rabbi Su meets a hospital doctor.
