= Lenny Henry in Pieces =

British tv sketch show

- Genre: Sketch comedy
- Written by: Matt Owen; Martin Trenaman
- Starring: Alison Steadman; Lenny Henry; Gina Yashere
- Country of origin: United Kingdom
- Original language: English
- No. of series: 2
- No. of episodes: 15 (inc. specials)

Production
- Running time: 30 minutes
- Production company: Tiger Aspect Productions

Original release
- Network: BBC One
- Release: 30 December 2000 – 2 May 2003

Lenny Henry in Pieces is a British stand-up and sketch show by comedians Lenny Henry and Gina Yashere. It aired on BBC One between 2000 and 2003.

The show began with two Christmas specials in 2000 and 2001. The 2000 show won the Golden Rose of Montreux award. This was followed up by a six-part series in March 2002. A second and final series consisting of seven episodes began in March 2003. It was followed by The Lenny Henry Show (2004), which also featured sketches.

The primary feature of the show is the sketches, although Henry has a brief stand-up section in each episode.

== Characters ==
Lenny Henry in Pieces introduced many new characters, the more notable examples being Donovan Bogarde, a randy OAP who is attracted to and pursues Mrs Johnson. He uses a series of sexual innuendos in each sentence. Gloria is a petrol station cashier who spends her time reading cheap novels, and is annoyed whenever someone requires service. Big Tramp is a homeless man who tries to get money out of people by any means necessary. Weekend Dad is a man called Clive, who only gets to see his son Curtis on the weekend, and is still bitter about it towards his estranged wife (Tracy-Ann Oberman). Unsuitable Bloke applies for jobs he is unqualified for and has no hope of getting. He believes the only reason for his rejection is because he's a black man, so he ends up getting the job anyway. Uncle Lucas, a friendly pensioner who is everyone's friend, but has a seemingly endless supply of compromising stories about people's childhoods (though he believes them innocent enough), which leads to (among other things), a politician getting run out of town; a high-ranking policeman being arrested for kidnap; a respected judge being exposed as a former teenage prostitute; an undercover detective being executed by a drugs baron; and an illustrious psychologist being driven to insanity. There is also Didi le Gateau, a French footballer. At the end shows Lenny with a partner (Omid Djalili) trying to be absolutely discreet to avoid certain death (often being shot) until Omid farts and Lenny bursts into peals of laughter (often trying to muffle in between laughs by putting a garment in his mouth) and they end up dead anyway. An example of this is when Lenny and Omid are POWs doing the Great Escape under the noses of the Nazis while a curfew is going on.

The second series introduced new characters including Blaxploitation Pope, who is Lucius T. Kool III, a ghetto brother and leader of the Catholic Church; President Umbukele, who is an expert in diplomacy and acquiring foreign aid, but then spends it all on silly things; bad influence Granddad; and a family of animated polar bears with Brummie accents, who live at Dudley Zoo.

== Transmissions ==
=== Series ===
Series	Start date	End date	Episodes
1	1 March 2002	5 April 2002	6
2	21 March 2003	2 May 2003	7

=== Specials ===
Date	Entitle
30 December 2000	Christmas Special
29 December 2001	Christmas Special
