= Fifteen Minutes =

Fifteen Minutes may refer to:

- Fifteen Minutes: A Tribute to The Velvet Underground, a 1994 Velvet Underground cover album by various artists
- Andy Warhol's Fifteen Minutes, a television show
- "Fifteen Minutes" (The Green Green Grass), a 2007 episode of the British television show
- "Fifteen Minutes" (Shrinking), a 2023 television episode
- "Fifteen Minutes", a song by Telepopmusik from the album Angel Milk, 2005

== See also ==
- 15 Minutes (disambiguation)
