= Diane Samuels =

British author and playwright (born 1960)

Diane Samuels (born 1960) is a British author and playwright.

Samuels was born into a Jewish family in Liverpool in 1960. She was educated at King David High School, Liverpool, studied history at Sidney Sussex College, Cambridge and then studied for a PGCE in drama at Goldsmiths, University of London. She worked as a drama teacher in inner London secondary schools for five years and as an education officer at the Unicorn Theatre for children.

Samuels lives in London and has been a full-time writer since 1992. She was a Pearson Creative Research Fellow at the British Library and is a visiting lecturer at Regent's University London and a reviewer of books for The Guardian newspaper.

== Works ==
Her works include:

- Frankie's Monster (1991), an adaptation of Vivien Alcock's children's book The Monster Garden
- Kindertransport (1993) examines the life, during World War II and afterwards, of a Kindertransport child. Though fictitious, it is based upon many real kindertransport stories.
- The True Life Fiction of Mata Hari (2001) was first performed at the Palace Theatre, Watford, in 2002, with Greta Scacchi in the lead role.
- 3 Sisters on Hope Street (2008), co-written with Tracy-Ann Oberman, is a reinterpretation of Chekhov's The Three Sisters, transferring events to Liverpool after World War II and re-casting the Pozorov sisters as three Jewish Englishwomen. It was first staged at the Everyman Theatre, Liverpool in 2008.
- The A-Z of Mrs P (2011), a musical co-written with composer Gwyneth Herbert, tells the story of Phyllis Pearsall's creation of the London A to Z street atlas. It opened in London at Southwark Playhouse on 21 February 2014, starring Peep Show actress Isy Suttie and Frances Ruffelle.
- Poppy + George (2016), another collaboration with Gwyneth Herbert, was performed at the Palace Theatre, Watford in February 2016.
- This is Me (2018), an autobiographical monologue, was performed at Chickenshed in Southgate, London in 2018.
- The Rhythm Method (2018), a musical about contraception, was performed at the Landor Space in Clapham, London in May 2018. It was yet another collaboration with Gwyneth Herbert.
