= The Way It Is (radio programme) =

The Way It Is is a topical news spoof show which ran for five series, each of eight shows, on BBC Radio 4 between 1998 and 2001. A one-off TV version was broadcast on BBC One in 2000. The programme is presented by fictional newsreaders Richard Richard (played by Simon Evans) and Lolly Swain (played by Tracy-Ann Oberman in the first series and subsequently by Laura Shavin). Regular characters include the hapless on-the-spot reporter James Gravadlax, who resorts to claiming "Scenes of terrible devastation " wherever he happens to be, Prince William fixated royal watcher Quentin Rumpleteazer, Jackie Trent, always posted outside 10 Downing Street no matter where the real story is and Finnish correspondent Pauli Hikillo who invariably replies to any question about the latest trends in Finland by shivering and saying how cold it is there, mad scientist Dr Benjamin Hardstaff who solves all problems using his trusty Sinclair ZX81 computer and many others.
