= Looking Through You =

Studio album by The Yeah You's
- Released: 28 September 2009
- Recorded: 2009
- Genre: Pop
- Length: 40.56
- Label: Universal Island
- Producers: Nick Ingram; Mike Kintish; Greg Wells; Phil Da Costa

Looking Through You is the debut album by British pop band The Yeah You's, released by Island Records on 28 September 2009.

Looking Through You has already spawned two singles, the first "15 Minutes" and the second single "Getting Up With You" which was released on 14 September 2009.

== Track listing ==
#	Title	Production and writing credits	
1.	"15 Minutes"	The Yeah You's, Greg Wells	3:28
2.	"Getting Up With You"	The Yeah You's, Greg Wells	3:21
3.	"If I Could"	The Yeah You's, Phil Da Costa	3:21
4.	"Won't Be Long"	The Yeah You's, Greg Wells	3:40
5.	"It's Happening To Me"	The Yeah You's, Greg Wells	3:24
6.	"Ready To Love Again"	The Yeah You's, Greg Wells	4:01
7.	"Clifftop"	The Yeah You's	3:48
8.	"Dive In"	The Yeah You's	3:25
9.	"If I'd Only Said Hello"	The Yeah You's	3:31
10.	"It All Runs Out"	The Yeah You's	4:12
11.	"Carry Me Home"	The Yeah You's, Phil Da Costa	4:41
12.	"Life's Forgotten Soldier" (iTunes Bonus Track)	The Yeah You's	5:00
