= Every 15 Minutes =

Drunk driving education program

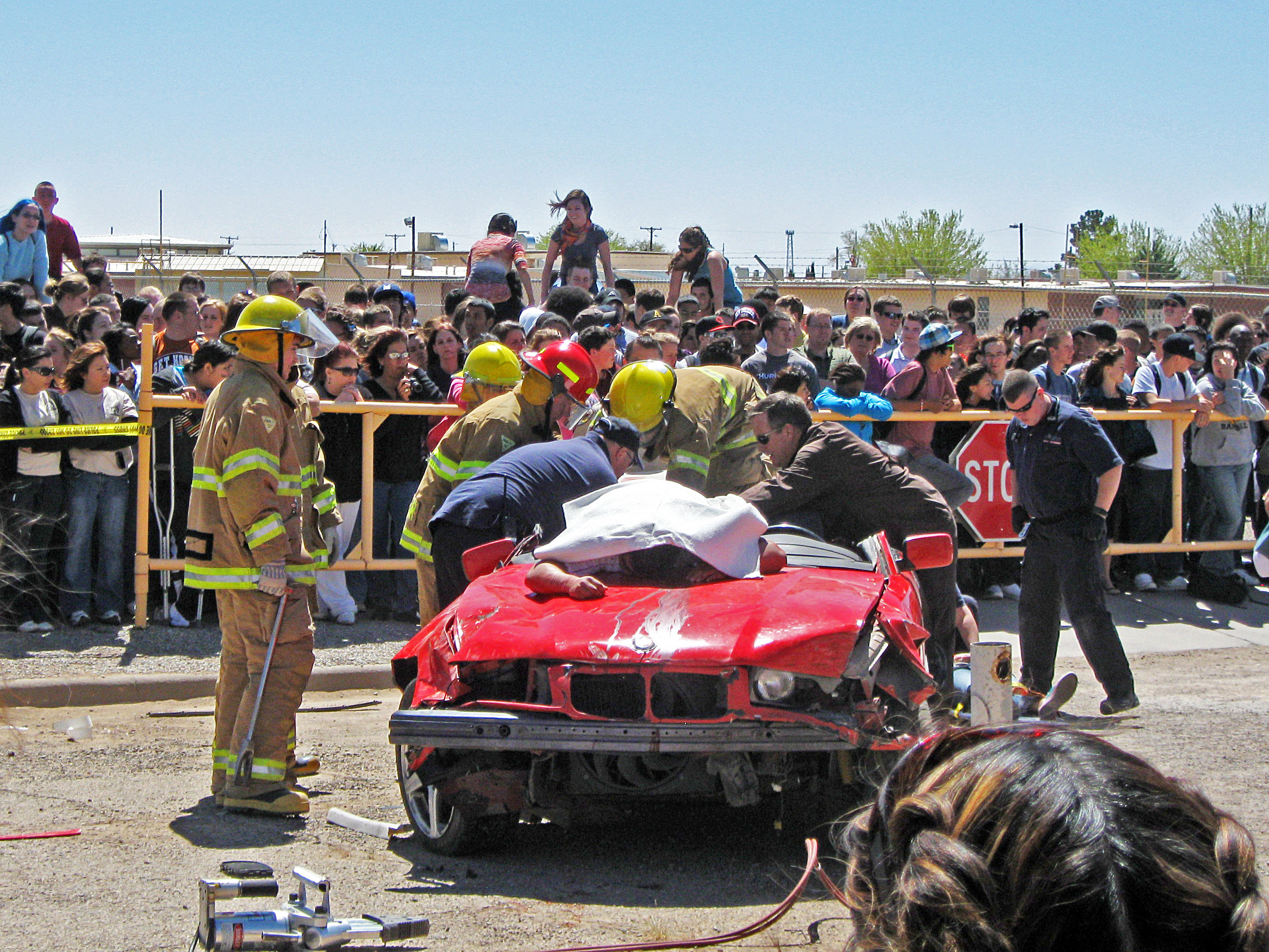
Every 15 Minutes programs can include a simulated car crash scene with teenage "victims."

Every 15 Minutes (E15M) is a two-day program focusing on high school juniors and seniors, which challenges them to think about driving while drunk, personal safety, and the responsibility of making mature decisions. Along with alcohol-related crashes, it focuses on the impact that their decisions would have on family and friends.

The Every 15 Minutes program originated in Canada and was soon adopted in the United States, starting in Spokane, Washington.

== Planning and events ==
=== Planning ===
The Every 15 Minutes program starts months in advance of the actual presentation; in fact, the very first program at a school will take about one year to plan and prepare. This planning period includes making arrangements with all of the involved agencies, the police, fire department, paramedics, hospital, court, lawyers, judge, jail facilities, coroner/funeral home, students, parents and school administrators. Student participants are selected to cover the full spectrum of the student body; thus, the audience will be able to relate to at least one of the participants on the crash day.

=== Recent advances ===
Due in large part to major grants and guidance by the Highway Patrol, the program has made its way to even more students' hometowns. In recent years, the California Highway Patrol has continued to fine-tune the Every 15 Minutes program, which has always been over two-days - day one being the crash, with day two as the assembly, featuring speakers ranging from the student participants and their parents to motivational speakers, relatives who have lost loved ones in drunk-driving crashes, medical personnel, lawyers and law enforcement officials.

In southern California the program has also been modified by a civilian coordinator who has taken the audience away from watching on the sidewalk to sitting in bleachers, allowing for better viewing; eliminating the grim reaper (often viewed by students as unreal); and adding a texting element to the sober driver. This element brings the program added reality, as current figures indicate more teens are being killed in text-related crashes than in drunk-driving crashes. However, the grants are dedicated to drunk-driving and would be eliminated if too much emphasis was placed on texting. To still maintain the drinking emphasis, it is mentioned that the sober driver could have lessened the severity of injuries or death had they been concentrating on the road and not on the phone.

Since its inception, technology has improved, giving a rise to the impact of the program and the gravity of the issue of drunk driving. During the event, new technology has allowed for a quick turn around of videography, allowing a comprehensive video of the cause and effect relationship between drunken driving and police involvement, family burden and community loss to be played at the second day's assembly. While student videographers sometimes take on this job, it is more common for professional crews to do the work. One early and frequent collaborator with the Every 15 Minutes program is Producer David Essary’s company Force4Digital, which has produced multiple productions yearly for California schools dating back to 2004. More recently, there has been a revival of student work, as schools either ask for one or two of their students to apprentice with the professionals, or students create a "making-of" film, shadowing the entire E15 process.

== Effectiveness ==
Studies that have tracked students before and after the Every 15 Minutes program have shown that the program may have a favorable short-term effect on students' stated attitudes but no effect on actual behavior. To date, no study has shown that the Every 15 Minutes program actually leads to a decrease in teen drinking and driving rates. This has led to charges that the Every 15 Minutes program is similar to the controversial DARE anti-drug program in that it produces the appearance of addressing the problem but does not produce the desired change in behavior. It has been long known that these types of approaches (i.e. scare tactics, dramatizations) that attempt to increase awareness or improve knowledge are ineffective. Other criticisms include the costs associated with the program, taking time away from EMS and law enforcement personnel to put on the program, and taking the place of more effective DUI prevention programs.

Questions have also been raised about the basic premise of the program, that one person dies every 15 minutes in an alcohol-related crash. The National Highway Traffic Safety Administration reports that in 1995, the first year the program was presented, the rate was actually one death every 30.4 minutes in the United States. This was using the NHTSA's very broad definition of "alcohol-related" wherein the crash was defined as "alcohol-related" if any person involved had a blood alcohol level of 0.01% or higher. The nationally recognized DUI level of presumption in the United States is 0.08%. The rate of alcohol-related fatalities has gradually declined and was one death every 40.4 minutes in 2007, one death every 45 minutes in 2008, and one death every 56.5 minutes in 2015.
