= 15 Minutes (The Yeah You's song) =

Single by The Yeah You's

from the album Looking Through You
- B-side: "Clifftop/Shine"
- Released: 22 June 2009
- Recorded: 2009
- Genre: Pop
- Length: 3:26
- Label: Island
- Songwriters: Nick Ingram; Mike Kintish; Phil da Costa

The Yeah You's singles chronology
| "15 Minutes" (2009) | "Getting Up with You" (2009) |

"15 Minutes" is a pop song performed and written by British group The Yeah You's. It was penned by the band for their debut studio album Looking Through You (2009), and released as the debut single in June 2009.

The song reached a peak position of number 36 on the UK Singles Chart. It was featured in the soundtrack of the film Easy A.

== Music video ==
The video follows the band's rise to stardom, with Andy Warhol's words, "In the Future, everyone will be famous for 15 minutes", appearing at the start of the video. The band can be seen singing in a bedroom, then busking on the streets. Doing a spot at a club, a record company producer overhears them and signs them. The band is next seen in a recording studio, before a video shoot, then on a talk show with Tracy-Ann Oberman, as they become the world's biggest band. This is all short lived as the bubble bursts and the video ends with the band back in the bedroom singing.

== Track listing ==
UK CD single

1. "15 Minutes" – 3:26
2. "Clifftop" – 3:49
3. "Shine" (with Tinchy Stryder) – 3:00
4. "15 Minutes" (acoustic version) – 3:19

== Charts ==
| Chart (2009) | Peak position |
|---|---|
| UK Singles (OCC) | 36 |
