= Madfox =

English pop rock band

- Also known as: The Yeah You's
- Origin: London, England
- Genres: Pop rock
- Years active: 2007–2012
- Label: Universal Island (2009)
- Past members: Nick Ingram; Mike Kintish
- Website: Official Facebook

Madfox (formerly The Yeah You's) were an English pop rock band, comprising Nick Ingram and Mike Kintish. The two members met in London when Ingram auditioned for a play that Kintish had written.

== Career ==
While performing under their original name of 'The Yeah You's', their debut single "15 Minutes" was released on 22 June 2009 by Island Records, and peaked on the UK Singles Chart at No. 36. Its music video premiered on YouTube on 22 April 2009. The B-side for the single was a collaboration with Tinchy Stryder, a cover version of Aswad's "Shine", recorded for Island Records 50th Anniversary. The song was featured in Screen Gems' Easy A starring Emma Stone.

Their second single "Getting Up With You" was released on 14 September 2009. It peaked at No. 92 in the UK Singles Chart. The video for the song was posted on YouTube on 20 July 2009 and has since received more than 46,000 views.

Their debut album Looking Through You was released on 28 September 2009, and was selected for BBC Radio 2's 'Album of The Week' from 5 October 2009. The album featured eleven tracks with a twelfth track, "Life's Forgotten Soldier", only available as a download. The album was predominantly produced by Greg Wells, and co-produced by The Yeah You's. Two tracks "If I Could" and "Carry Me Home" were produced by Phil Da Costa. All tracks were mixed by Mark 'Spike' Stent at Chalice Studios, Los Angeles, with the exception of "Carry Me Home" and "If I'd Only Said Hello" which were mixed by Chris Potter, and the bonus track "Life's Forgotten Soldier", which was mixed by John Webber at Blue Pro Studios, in the UK. The album was mastered at Blue Pro Mastering in London.
