= In the Heights (album) =

2008 original Broadway cast recording

In the Heights (Original Broadway Cast Recording)

Cast recording by the original Broadway cast of In the Heights
- Released: June 3, 2008
- Recorded: May 5–11, 2008
- Studio: Legacy Studios, New York City
- Genre: Musical theatre; show tune; hip hop; salsa; merengue; pop rap; funk; soul
- Length: 89:02
- Label: Ghostlight
- Producer: Lin-Manuel Miranda; Andres Levin; Kurt Deutsch

In the Heights (Original Broadway Cast Recording) is the cast album to the Broadway production In the Heights. Released on June 3, 2008, the album features 23 songs with music and lyrics by Lin-Manuel Miranda and performed by the cast members. The album was one of the best-selling cast albums in the 2000s, sold around 500,000 copies and certified Gold by the Recording Industry Association of America. It won the Grammy Award for Best Musical Theater Album, the following year.

== Release and promotion ==
The recording was distributed in a double album by Ghostlight Records with its vice president Kurt Deutsch and Andres Levin, produced the album with Miranda. The album featured 23 songs with 12 in the first disc and 11 in the second disc and was packaged in a 68-page booklet that contains the photos of the cast members and the song lyrics. The cast members performed the songs live at the Virgin Megastore retail chain in Times Square, 1540 Broadway at 46th street, to commemorate the release of the cast recording and unveiled a post-performance CD to the customers.

On July 30, 2018, Ghostlight Records issued a 3-LP vinyl box set of the original cast recording, to celebrate the 10th anniversary of the album's release, and was exclusively made available through the Barnes & Noble retail stores. The box set consisted of 21 tracks with newly remastered audio and a 12-inch booklet accompanying. It was again re-issued in a red, blue and white-colored vinyl in a special "limited edition" box set and released as a Barnes & Noble exclusive on September 4, 2020 in conjunction with the Vinyl weekend (September 4–6).

== Commercial performance ==
The album debuted at number 82 on Billboard 200 for the week beginning with June 21, and topped the Cast albums chart beating the recording of Jersey Boys, South Pacific, Wicked and Legally Blonde.

== Track listing ==
No.	Title	Performer(s)	Length
1.	"In The Heights"	Lin-Manuel Miranda; In the Heights Cast	7:38
2.	"Breathe"	Mandy Gonzalez; Cast	4:04
3.	"Benny's Dispatch"	Christopher Jackson; Gonzalez	2:17
4.	"It Won't Be Long Now"	Karen Olivo; Miranda; Robin de Jesús	4:35
5.	"Inútil" (Useless)	Carlos Gomez	2:50
6.	"No Me Diga" (You Don't Say)	Andréa Burns; Janet Dacal; Olivo; Gonzalez	2:26
7.	"96,000"	Burns; Jackson; Dacal; Olivo; Miranda; de Jesús; Seth Stewart; Cast	5:35
8.	"Paciencia Y Fe" (Patience and Faith)	Olga Merediz; Cast	4:55
9.	"When You're Home"	Jackson; Gonzalez; Cast	5:20
10.	"Piragua"	Eliseo Román	1:53
11.	"The Club"	Cast	5:58
12.	"Blackout"	Cast	3:57
13.	"Sunrise"	Jackson; Gonzalez; Cast	4:08
14.	"Hundreds Of Stories"	Miranda; Merediz	3:40
15.	"Enough"	Priscilla Lopez	2:38
16.	"Carnaval Del Barrio"	Burns	7:26
17.	"Atención"	Gomez	0:53
18.	"Alabanza"	Miranda; Gonzalez; Cast	3:17
19.	"Everything I Know"	Gonzalez	3:56
20.	"Piragua" (Reprise)	Román	0:52
21.	"Champagne"	Olivo; Miranda	2:44
22.	"When The Sun Goes Down"	Jackson; Gonzalez	2:32
23.	"Finale"	Doreen Montalvo; Miranda; Cast	5:28
Total length:			89:02

== Personnel ==
Credits adapted from liner notes

Vocalists

- Lin-Manuel Miranda – Usnavi De La Vega
- Mandy Gonzalez – Nina Rosario
- Christopher Jackson – Benny
- Karen Olivo – Vanessa
- Olga Merediz – Abuela Claudia
- Carlos Gomez – Kevin Rosario
- Priscilla Lopez – Camila Rosario
- Robin de Jesús – Sonny
- Andréa Burns – Daniela
- Janet Dacal – Carla
- Seth Stewart – Graffiti Pete
- Eliseo Román – Piragüero

Instrumentalists

- Bass – Irio O'Farrell
- Conductor – Alex Lacamoire
- Associate conductor – Zachary Dietz
- Coordinator – Michael Keller
- Assistant coordinator – Colleen Darnell
- Drums – Andres Patrick Forero
- Guitar – Manny Moriera
- Keyboards – Alex Lacamoire
- Keyboards – Zachary Dietz
- Percussion – Doug Hinriches, Wilson Torres
- Synthesizer – Randy Cohen
- Trumpet – Trever Neumann, Raul Agraz

== Charts ==
=== Weekly charts ===
Weekly chart performance for In the Heights
Chart (2008)	Peak position
US Billboard 200	82
US Cast Albums (Billboard)	1

=== Year-end charts ===
Year-end chart performance for In the Heights
Chart (2008)	Position
US Cast Albums (Billboard)	9
Chart (2009)	Position
US Cast Albums (Billboard)	8
Chart (2010)	Position
US Cast Albums (Billboard)	6

== Certifications ==
Region	Certification	Certified units/sales
United States (RIAA)	Gold	500,000^{‡}
^{‡} Sales+streaming figures based on certification alone.
