= In the Heights (film) =

2021 film by Jon M. Chu

- Theatrical release poster
- Directed by: Jon M. Chu
- Screenplay by: Quiara Alegría Hudes
- Based on: In the Heights by Quiara Alegría Hudes and Lin-Manuel Miranda
- Produced by: Lin-Manuel Miranda; Quiara Alegría Hudes; Scott Sanders; Anthony Bregman; Mara Jacobs
- Starring: Anthony Ramos; Corey Hawkins; Melissa Barrera; Leslie Grace; Olga Merediz; Daphne Rubin-Vega; Gregory Diaz IV; Jimmy Smits
- Cinematography: Alice Brooks
- Edited by: Myron Kerstein
- Music by: Lin-Manuel Miranda; Alex Lacamoire; Bill Sherman
- Production companies: 5000 Broadway Productions; Barrio Grrrl! Productions; Likely Story; SGS Pictures; Endeavor Content
- Distributed by: Warner Bros. Pictures
- Release dates: June 4, 2021 (LALIFF); June 10, 2021 (United States)
- Running time: 143 minutes
- Country: United States
- Language: English
- Budget: $55 million
- Box office: $45.2 million

In the Heights is a 2021 American musical drama film directed by Jon M. Chu and written by Quiara Alegría Hudes, based on her and Lin-Manuel Miranda's 2005 stage musical. It stars Anthony Ramos, Melissa Barrera, Corey Hawkins, Leslie Grace (in her film debut), Olga Merediz, Daphne Rubin-Vega, Gregory Diaz IV, and Jimmy Smits. Like the musical, the film is set in the predominantly Dominican community of Washington Heights neighborhood of Upper Manhattan in New York City, and follows various residents as they pursue their sueñitos (little dreams) for a better life.

In the Heights was originally set to be adapted by Universal Pictures in 2008, with Kenny Ortega hired to direct. After that version fell through, the project was eventually started back up in 2016, with Chu set to direct and Ramos being cast in October 2018. The rest of the cast joined in April 2019, and filming took place around New York City that summer.

Originally intended to be released in 2020, In the Heights was postponed due to the COVID-19 pandemic. The film had its world premiere at the Los Angeles Latino International Film Festival on June 4, 2021, and was released in the United States on June 10 in theaters and streaming on HBO Max under a 30-day simultaneous exhibition window. It was widely praised for Chu's direction, the performances, musical numbers and the cinematography, but it was a box-office bomb, grossing just $45 million against its $55 million production budget and $200 million break-even point. For his performance in the film, Ramos was nominated for a Golden Globe Award in the category Best Actor – Motion Picture Musical or Comedy. Since its release, the film has been included in lists of the best musical films of the 21st century.

== Plot ==
Usnavi de la Vega tells a group of children a story of Washington Heights. Ten years earlier, Usnavi is the owner of a bodega in the neighborhood. After chasing off street artist "Graffiti Pete", he introduces: Abuela Claudia, the neighborhood matriarch who raised him; Kevin Rosario, who runs a taxi company; Benny, Kevin's employee and Usnavi's best friend; the beauty salon ladies Daniela, Carla, and Cuca; Sonny, Usnavi's teenage cousin; and Vanessa, Usnavi's love interest ("In the Heights").

Alejandro, an attorney and family friend, informs Usnavi that his late father's business in the Dominican Republic, which he dreams of reviving, is for sale. Kevin's daughter Nina returns from Stanford University. After seeing Benny ("Benny's Dispatch"), she tells her father she cannot afford tuition, but he brushes her off, telling her not to worry ("Breathe").

Nina visits Daniela's salon, which is moving to the Bronx due to rising rents in Manhattan, where she reconnects with the ladies but reveals she has dropped out of Stanford ("No Me Diga"). Vanessa submits a rental application downtown, where she dreams of becoming a fashion designer, but is rejected ("It Won't Be Long Now"). She heads to the bodega, where Sonny asks her out for Usnavi.

Sonny learns a lottery ticket the bodega sold has won $96,000. At the public pool, everybody in the neighborhood fantasizes about what they would do with the money ("96,000"), while the local piragüero laments losing business to a Mister Softee truck ("Piragua"). Reminiscing about their childhood, Benny reassures Nina she is destined for greatness ("When You're Home"). Usnavi talks to Sonny's father about letting Sonny come with him to the Dominican Republic, but Sonny's father implies he and Sonny are undocumented immigrants and cannot leave.

Kevin reveals he has sold his business to pay for Nina's tuition, but she refuses the money, revealing the real reason she dropped out was the racism she experienced. Usnavi and Vanessa head to the salsa club for their date, but he is too nervous to dance with her. After multiple men dance with Vanessa, Usnavi tries to make her jealous by dancing with another woman ("The Club"). The power goes out, and Sonny and Graffiti Pete illuminate the neighborhood with fireworks. Vanessa and Usnavi argue, and she rejects him ("Blackout").

Usnavi and a few others regroup at Abuela Claudia's apartment. Abuela begins to struggle with the effects of the heat, and Usnavi helps her to bed. Watching the found family she helped bring together, she reminisces about her childhood in Cuba and coming to Nueva York, enduring hardships to be where she is today ("Paciencia y Fe"). She dies peacefully, and the neighborhood comes together to mourn ("Alabanza"). At a protest for DACA, Sonny learns that he cannot go to college as an undocumented immigrant. Nina resolves to return to Stanford to find a pathway in life for undocumented children.

Finding Vanessa's rental application in the trash, Usnavi asks Daniela to co-sign. Daniela is moving out but no-one can be bothered to show up and say goodbye. She is disappointed with the block's negativity (over the power outage and Abuela's death), so she rouses the neighborhood into a celebration ("Carnaval del Barrio"), as the power outage ends. Vanessa and Usnavi reconcile.

A month later, Nina is returning to Stanford. Benny promises to join her in Palo Alto, and they kiss ("When the Sun Goes Down"). As Usnavi prepares to leave for the Dominican Republic, he discovers that Abuela held the winning lottery ticket, and has left it to him. Vanessa arrives with champagne, having learned about Usnavi's help with her new lease. She suggests Usnavi stay but he refuses, and she kisses him, lamenting that she was too late in realizing her feelings for him ("Champagne").

Usnavi gives Alejandro the lottery ticket to use for Sonny's DACA fees. The next morning, Vanessa takes Usnavi to the bodega and shows him a fashion line she created the previous night inspired by Graffiti Pete's work. Seeing Pete's murals celebrating Abuela, Usnavi decides to stay. The story returns to the present day, revealing that Usnavi is telling his story in the remodeled bodega to his and Vanessa's daughter, Iris. Everyone sings and dances in the street, while Usnavi expresses his elation at being in Washington Heights, where he has always belonged ("Finale"). In a post-credit scene, the Mister Softee truck has broken down, while the piragüero has success with his business ("Piragua Reprise").

== Cast ==
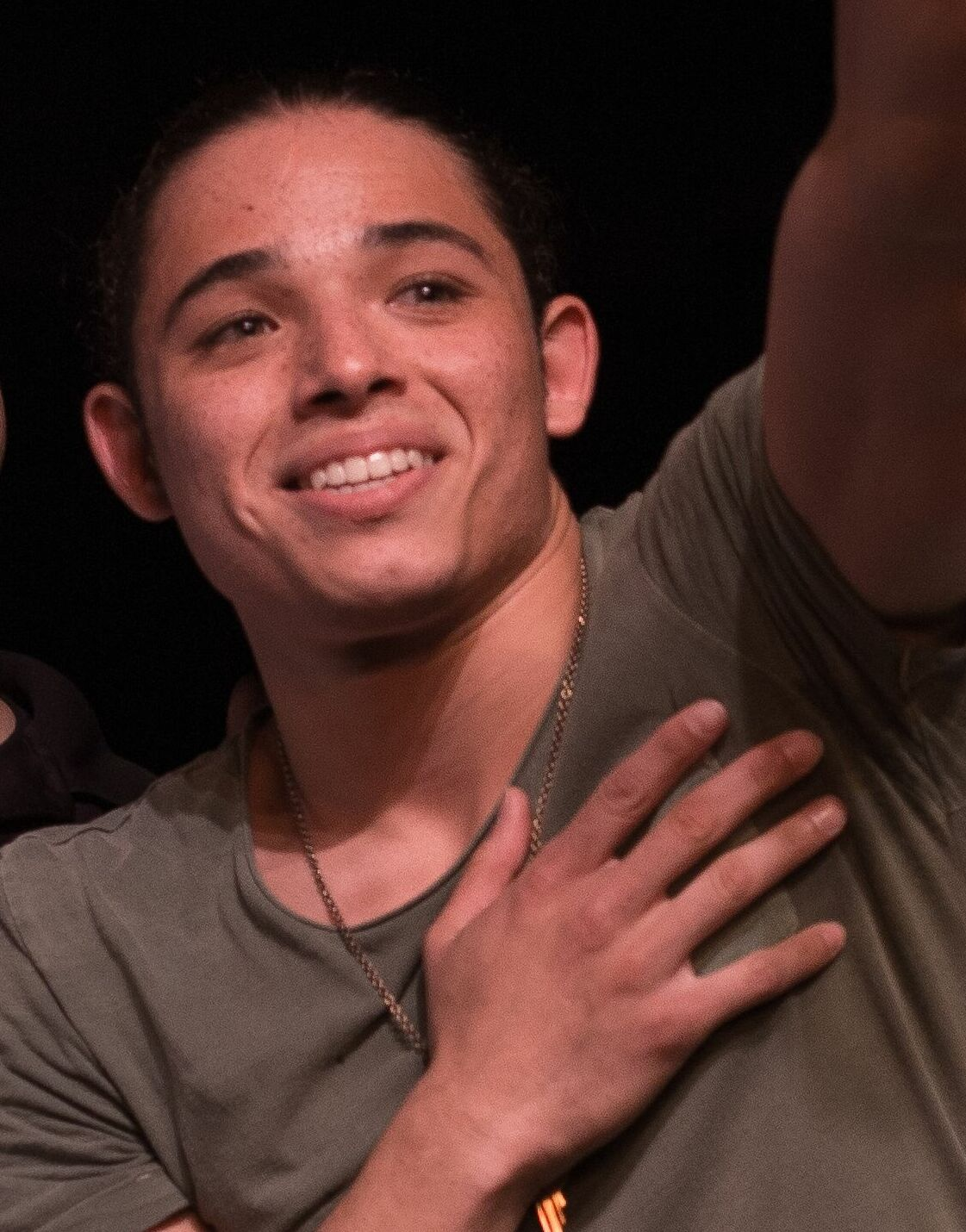
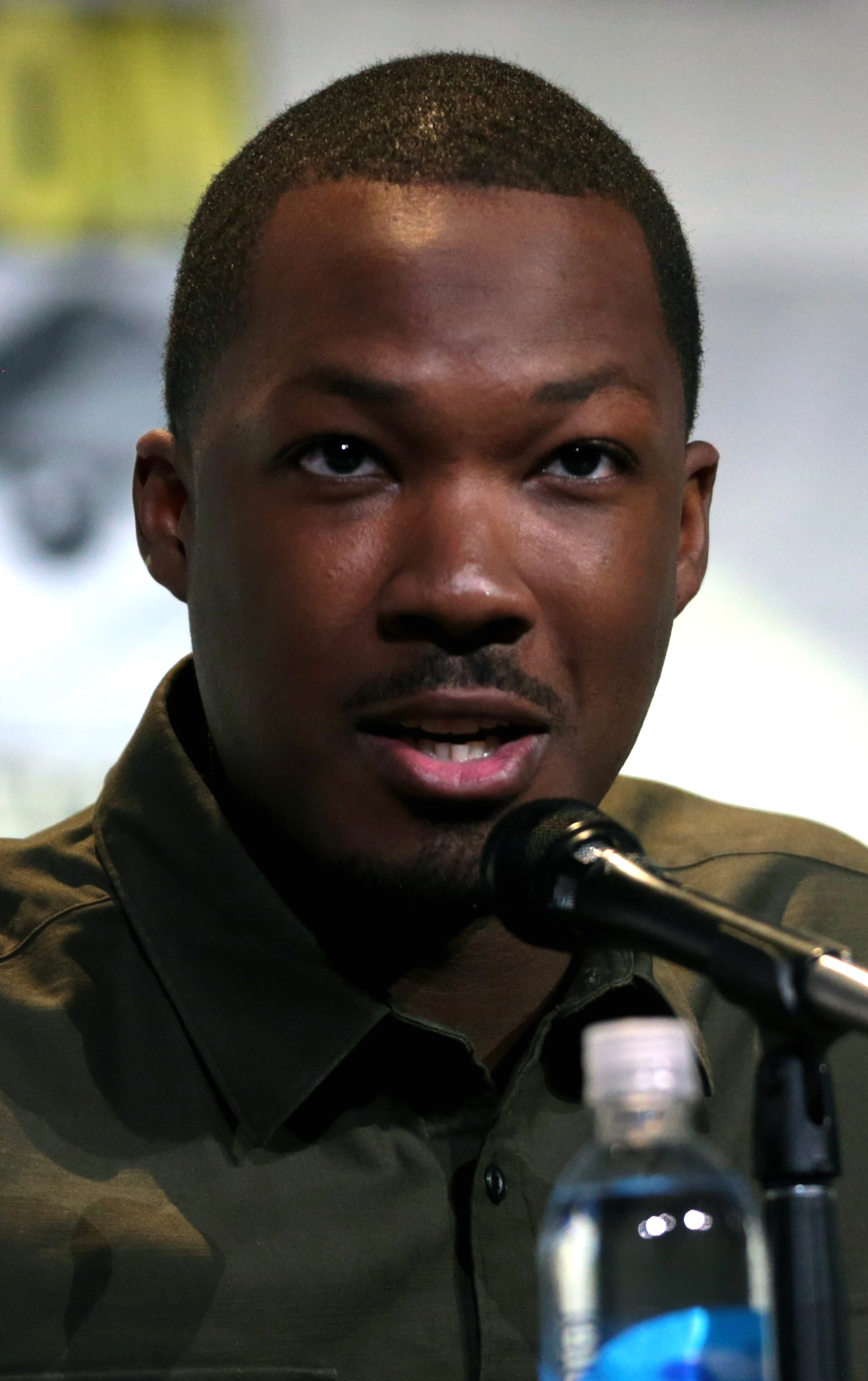
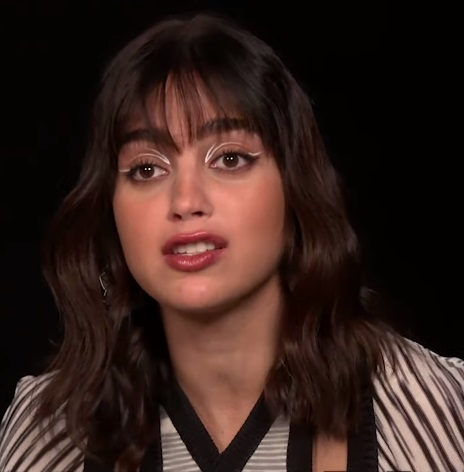
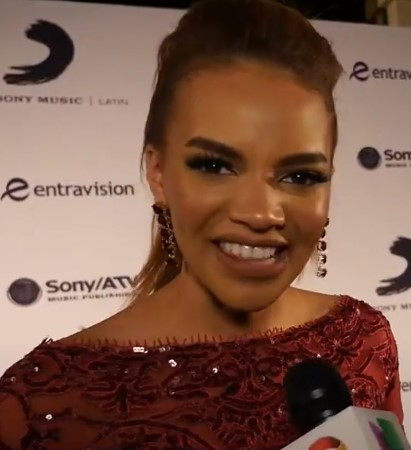
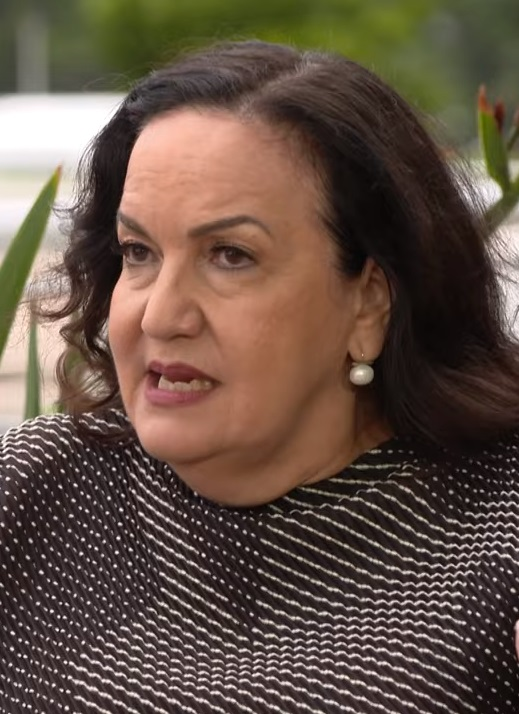
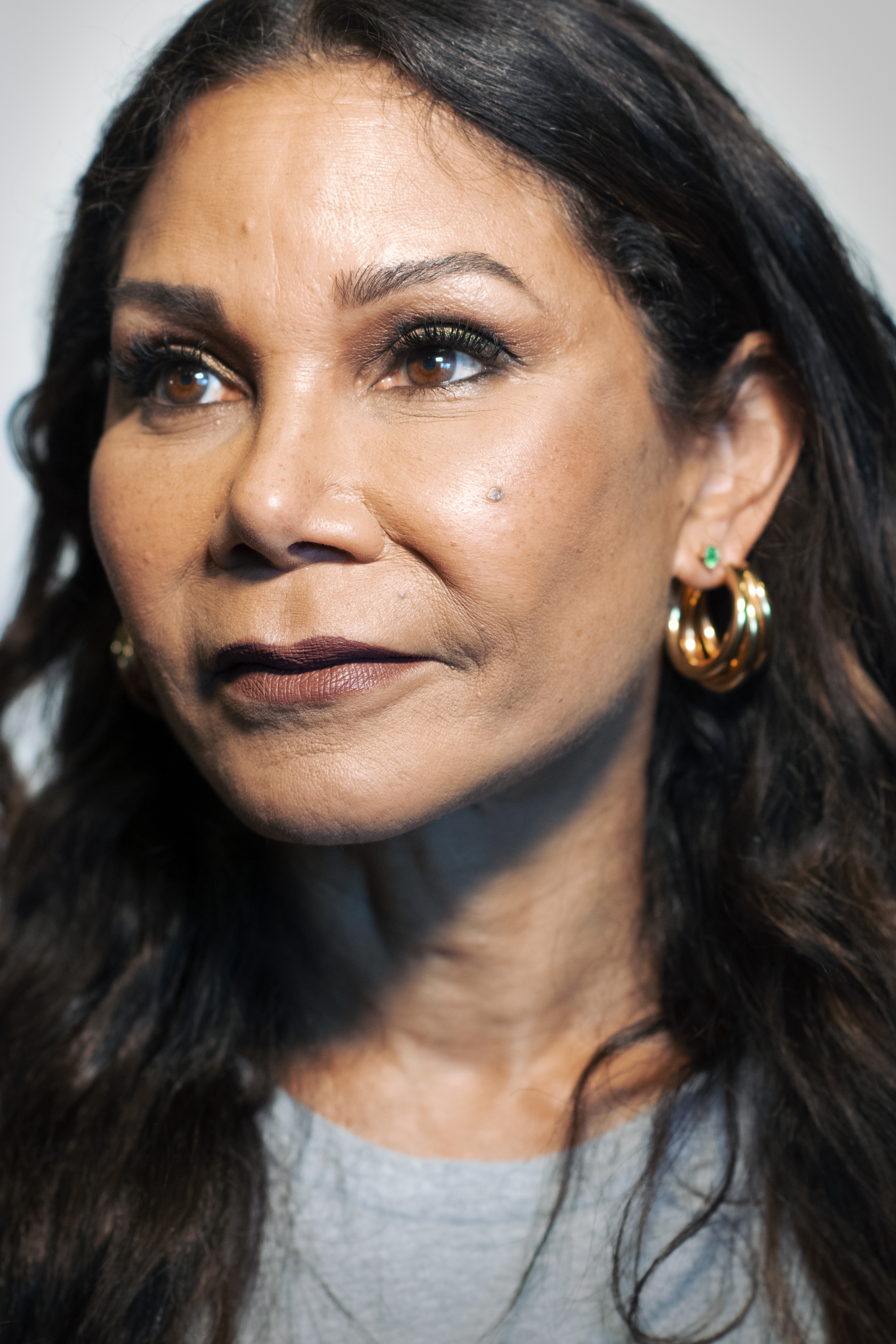
Top row: Anthony Ramos (left), Corey Hawkins and Melissa Barrera respectively play the roles of Usnavi de la Vega, Benny, and Vanessa Morales.
Bottom row: Leslie Grace (left), Olga Merediz and Daphne Rubin-Vega respectively play the roles of Nina Rosario, Abuela Claudia, and Daniela.
- Anthony Ramos as Usnavi de la Vega
- Corey Hawkins as Benny
- Melissa Barrera as Vanessa Morales
- Leslie Grace as Nina Rosario
  - Ariana Saintclaire Gomez and Ariana Greenblatt as Young Nina Rosario
- Olga Merediz as Abuela Claudia
- Daphne Rubin-Vega as Daniela
- Gregory Diaz IV as Sonny de la Vega
- Jimmy Smits as Kevin Rosario
- Stephanie Beatriz as Carla
- Dascha Polanco as Cuca
- Marc Anthony as Gapo
- Noah Catala as Graffiti Pete
- Olivia Perez as Iris de la Vega, Usnavi's daughter

In addition, Lin-Manuel Miranda, who wrote the music and lyrics of the original musical and played Usnavi in the original Broadway run, appears as the piragüero, who keeps having run-ins with the Mr. Softee Truck Driver, portrayed by Christopher Jackson, who originated the Benny character through to the original Broadway run. Olga Merediz also reprises her role as Abuela Claudia.

The film includes contributions by original Broadway cast members, such as cameos by Seth Stewart, Doreen Montalvo (in her posthumous role) and Javier Muñoz, as well as background vocals by Andréa Burns, Janet Dacal, Mandy Gonzalez, Joshua Henry, Krysta Rodriguez, and Jon Rua. Broadway actor Patrick Page appears as Pike Phillips. Miranda's parents Luis Miranda and Luz Towns-Miranda make cameo appearances during "Breathe". Also in the song "Breathe", actress Ariana Greenblatt makes an appearance as the character of young Nina. The Kid Mero provides the voice of the DJ at the start of the film (a role filled by Rubin-Vega in the original stage production). Valentina appears as a patron of Daniela's salon. NPR journalist Maria Hinojosa appears as the protest leader at the DACA rally. The film also features an appearance from Rennie Harris.

== Production ==
=== Development ===
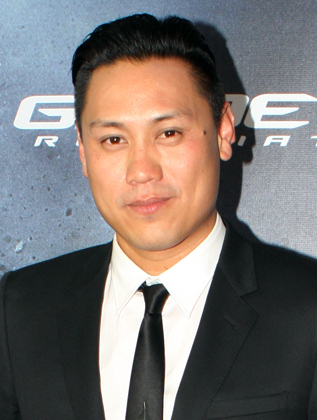
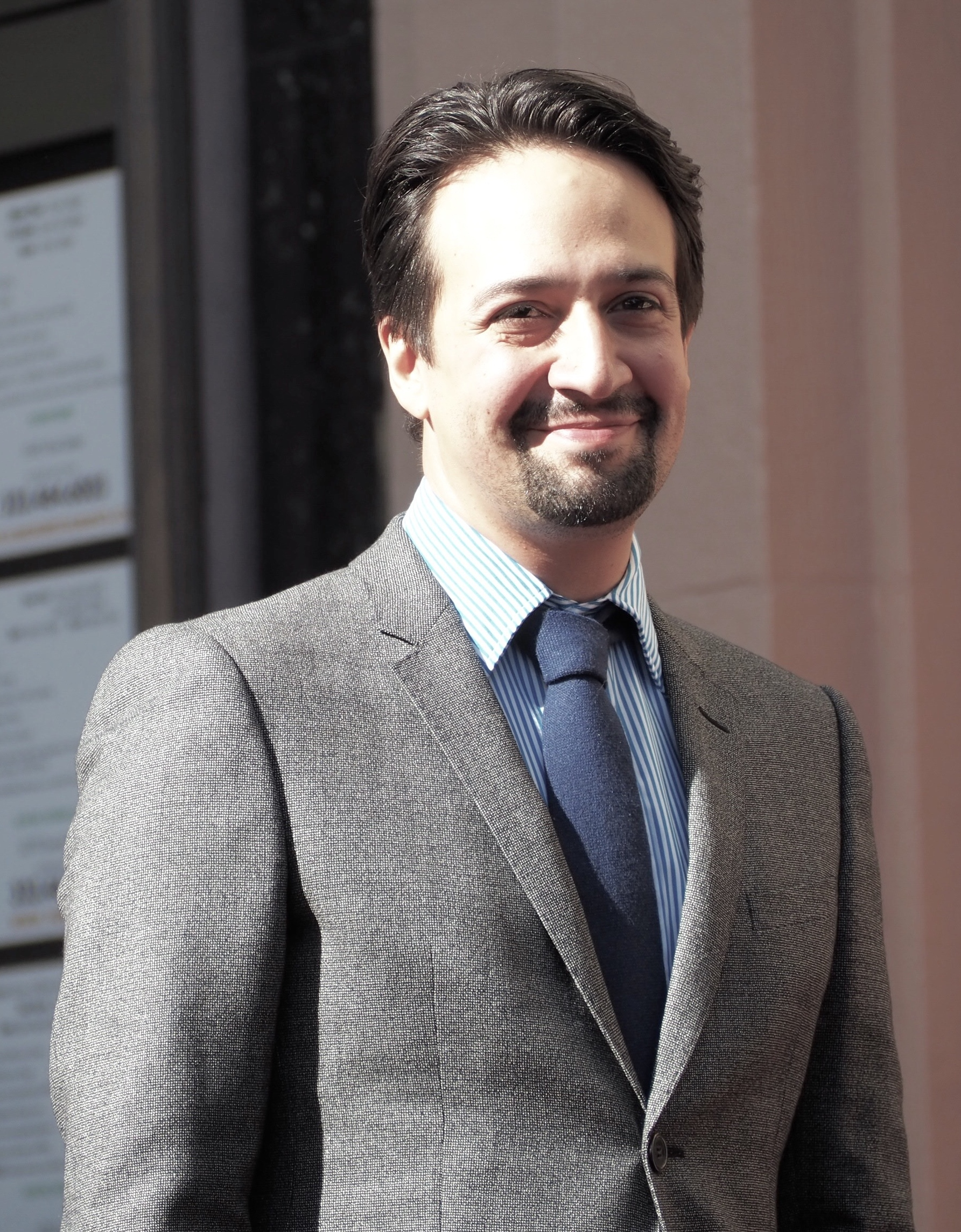
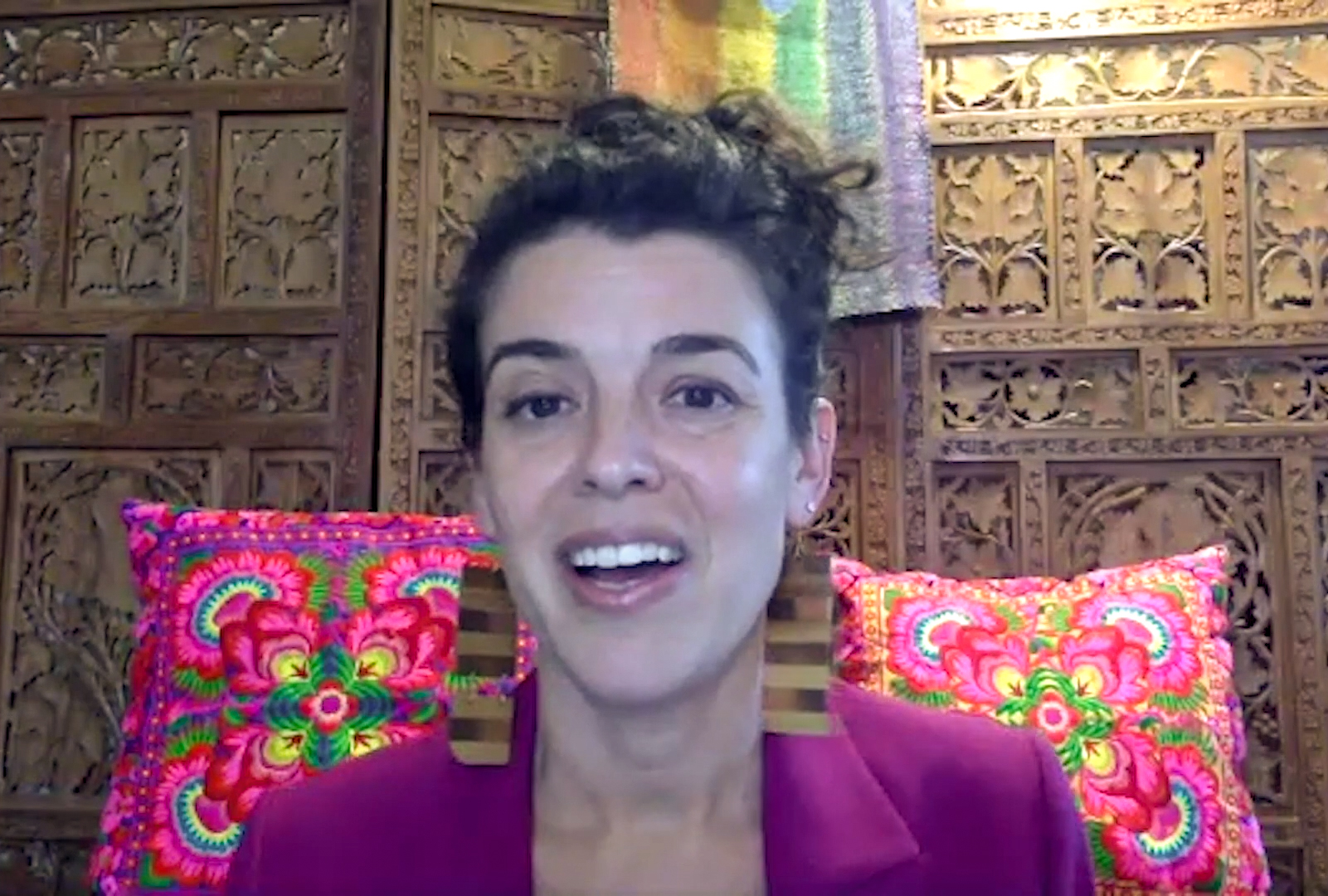
Director Jon M. Chu (left), composer, creator and co-producer Lin-Manuel Miranda, and screenwriter Quiara Alegría Hudes.

On November 7, 2008, Universal Pictures announced that they planned to adapt the original musical as a feature film for release in 2011. Kenny Ortega was set to direct the film, which was slated to begin filming in summer 2011 with a budget of $37 million. However, the project was canceled in March 2011; reportedly, this was due to the fact Universal was looking for a "bankable Latino star" like Shakira or Jennifer Lopez instead of unknown actors. In January 2012, Lin-Manuel Miranda stated that the film adaptation was back under discussion; in the meantime, he went on vacation and started to read a biography of Alexander Hamilton, which would lead to his next project, Hamilton. In May 2016, it was announced that Miranda would co-produce the film with Harvey Weinstein and backing from The Weinstein Company. On June 10, 2016, Jon M. Chu came on board to direct the film adaptation of the musical. In the aftermath of numerous sexual misconduct allegations made against Weinstein, his producer credit on the film was removed, with the rights to the film eventually auctioned off to Warner Bros. for $50 million. Warner Bros. was one of several studios wanting to produce In the Heights—due to the success of Hamilton; to persuade Miranda and Chu, they built a backlot bodega with piragua carts and set up performances of songs from the show. The budget was set at $55 million.

=== Casting ===
In October 2018, Anthony Ramos was cast in an undisclosed role, later revealed to be the lead of Usnavi. Miranda, who played the role in the Broadway production, watched Ramos play the part in the 2018 Kennedy Center production and praised him on Twitter. In January 2019, Corey Hawkins was cast in the role of Benny. In April 2019, Jimmy Smits, Melissa Barrera, Leslie Grace, Olga Merediz, Gregory Diaz, Daphne Rubin-Vega, Stephanie Beatriz and Dascha Polanco were cast. In June 2019, Marc Anthony and Lin-Manuel Miranda joined the cast, with Miranda cast as Piragüero. Miranda revealed in an interview on The Tonight Show that he initially did not plan on appearing in the film at all, having decided he was too old to play Usnavi during development. Chu and Hudes subsequently pushed for him to play the Piragüero, which he was reluctant to do. He relented when Hudes threatened to cut the song "Piragua" unless he played the role.

=== Filming ===
Filming began on June 3, 2019, in New York City. The bulk of filming was done at the intersection of 175th Street and Audubon Avenue, where STO Domingo Grocery Inc. was used as the exterior of the bodega. The musical number "96,000" was filmed at the Highbridge Pool featuring synchronized swimming and shot over two days with 500 extras. Christopher Scott, who had worked with Jon M. Chu on the YouTube series The LXD as well as the films Step Up Revolution and Step Up All In, served as choreographer. "Paciencia y Fe" was shot in the abandoned lower level of the Brooklyn Ninth Avenue station, which had previously been used in the film Joker (the "Joker Stairs" were also used as a filming location). The team had wanted to film the sequence inside the New York Transit Museum but could not as they were only allowed to use the space for the one day the museum is closed to the public. However, they were able to rent vintage subway cars from the museum for use in the number. The tunnel sequence at the end of the song was shot in the pedestrian tunnel at the 191st Street station. As the tunnel is a public access point for the station, the team was only given permission to close it for filming at night. The lights, which were rigged during the day while the tunnel was open, were initially designed to display a rainbow of light, but at the last second Chu had them changed to red, white, and blue – the colors of the Cuban, Puerto Rican, and American flags.

The vocal performances in the film are a mix of the actors singing live on-set, pre-recorded audio, and re-recorded in the studio during post-production. The production team's choice to use one or the others depended on the environment of the scene and tone of the song. Usnavi and Vanessa's duet, "Champagne", which is one continuous shot, was recorded entirely on-set.

The film is dedicated to the memory of Doreen Montalvo, a member of the original Broadway cast who appears in the film as one of the singers during "Breathe" and reprises her role as the Bolero singer performing "Siempre". Montalvo died in October 2020, after the film's postponed release date.

== Differences from the musical ==
Several changes were made from the show, which first ran in 2005, such as adding references to the Deferred Action for Childhood Arrivals (DACA) immigration policy and microaggressions, and cutting certain characters and songs.

- The most significant of these cut characters is Camila Rosario, Nina's mother, who is still alive in the show: Hudes cited a desire to focus on two specific matriarchs in the community, Abuela Claudia and Daniela. Daniela and Carla are portrayed as being in a romantic relationship rather than friends, with Hudes citing a desire to retain a "traditional married couple" for the story.
- In the show, Nina loses her scholarship to Stanford after her grades dropped from taking extra jobs to support her family, which influences her decision to drop out. In the film, she drops out due to a combination of experiencing racism and her guilt over her father's sacrifices in order for her to attend college. Sonny's status as an undocumented immigrant is new to the film, and Nina's reason for returning to college was changed to fighting for undocumented children after realizing that Sonny can't go to college due to his status.
- "Paciencia y Fe" originally followed "96,000" and ended with the reveal that Abuela Claudia bought the winning lottery ticket, which serves as the impetus for Usnavi's impending move to the Dominican Republic. In the film, the song is repurposed as Abuela's dying vision, with her death and the resultant "Alabanza" scene taking place on the night of the blackout rather than after "Carnaval del Barrio" the following day. Abuela's winning ticket is not revealed until the end of the film, and a new backstory of Usnavi buying his father's old store in the Dominican Republic is given as the reason for his desire to move.
- Vanessa and Usnavi's romance was recentered as the film's focus, as opposed to the show's focus on Benny and Nina. Kevin's disapproval of Benny dating Nina due to not being Latino, a major source of conflict in the show, is absent in the film, with the implication that Benny and Nina dated prior to her moving away. Notably, Benny and Nina's argument from the show's version of "The Club" and "Blackout" is given to Vanessa and Usnavi. There is no fight at the club, and Usnavi's store is not ransacked during the blackout as it is in the show.
- As a result of these changes, "Inútil," "Sunrise," "Hundreds of Stories," "Enough," "Atención", and "Everything I Know" were cut from the film.
- References to Donald Trump in "96,000" and Manny Ramirez in "Benny's Dispatch" were changed to Tiger Woods and Big Papi, respectively.
- Alejandro, Cuca, and Gapo de la Vega were created for the film.
- In the show, Vanessa wants to move out of Washington Heights to get away from her mother. In the film, she appears to live alone and wishes to move downtown to pursue her fashion design dreams.
- The show's version of "It Won't Be Long Now" includes a bridge where Usnavi and Sonny say good morning and dance with Vanessa, only to be interrupted by Daniela telling her to buy a drink. This bridge was filmed but cut, and would have been sung by people Vanessa passes on the street in a choreographed sequence, shortly before she enters the bodega. Footage of the sequence shot by a bystander was later leaked online.

== Music ==
The film's soundtrack album was released by Atlantic Records and WaterTower Music on June 10, 2021, the same day as its U.S. release. The songs are composed and written by Lin-Manuel Miranda, who produced the tracks with Alex Lacamoire, Bill Sherman and Greg Wells. Two singles – the title track was released on the album's pre-order date on April 23, 2021, and "96,000" was released via streaming on May 3, 2021, prior to the album's release date.

Two songs created for the film but not included on the soundtrack are "Always", a doo-wop version of "Siempre" performed by Mandy Gonzalez, who originated the role of Nina on Broadway, in the background of the dry cleaners scene, and "Cuándo Llega El Tren", performed by Bronx musician Flaco Navaja, which plays in the background of the bodega when Sonny helps Usnavi ask Vanessa out. Both songs feature backing vocals by Miranda, Lacamoire, and Sherman. In addition, a hold music version of "You'll Be Back" from Hamilton plays as an easter egg during the scene where Kevin Rosario calls Stanford University. Despite its inclusion in the film's post-credit scene, "Piragua (Reprise)" is not on the soundtrack album.

== Release ==
=== Theatrical and streaming ===
In the Heights was first screened virtually for critics on April 15, 2021. It had its world premiere at the Tribeca Film Festival in New York City on June 9, 2021, following an advanced screening at the Los Angeles Latino International Film Festival on June 4, 2021, at the TCL Chinese Theater in Hollywood. It was released in the United States on June 10, 2021, in both theaters and on HBO Max.

It was previously scheduled to be released on June 26, 2020, but it was delayed to June 18, 2021, due to the COVID-19 pandemic, before being moved up a week to June 11, and finally one day earlier to June 10. On May 9, 2021, select Cinemark, Regal Cinemas and AMC theaters hosted a free advance screening in honor of Mother's Day. Internationally, the film was released in the United Kingdom on June 18, 2021. Other markets like European and Australasian countries have scheduled dates planned for between July and September 2021.

=== Home media ===
In the Heights was released on digital platforms on July 30, 2021, with the DVD, Blu-ray, and 4K UHD releases from Warner Bros. Home Entertainment arriving a month later on August 30, 2021. The film returned to HBO Max on October 28.

== Reception ==
=== Box office ===
In the Heights grossed $30 million in the United States and Canada, and $15.2 million in other territories, for a worldwide total of $45.2 million. Due to its $55 million production budget and another $50 million spent on marketing, Variety estimated the film would need to gross around $200 million worldwide in order to break-even.

In the United States and Canada, In the Heights was released alongside Peter Rabbit 2: The Runaway and The House Next Door: Meet the Blacks 2, and was initially projected to gross $25–35 million from 3,456 theaters in its opening weekend, though an estimate of $10 million to the midteens was also suggested. A poll by Fandango Media found that the film would be the first seen in a theater since the pandemic began for 96% of people pre-ordering tickets for it. After grossing $5 million on its first day, weekend estimates were lowered to $13 million. It went on to debut to just $11.5 million, finishing second behind holdover A Quiet Place Part II. 67% of the audience was over the age of 25, with 63% being female; 40% of the opening weekend audience was Latino.

While some analysts, such as Anthony D'Alessandro for Deadline Hollywood, suggested that the film's underperformance could be partially blamed on its simultaneous release on HBO Max, Rebecca Rubin posited in Variety that it could be attributed to alternative factors, such as the film's 143-minute runtime reducing the number of individual screenings per day, 25% of American theaters remaining closed at the time of release (and many theaters which had opened limiting audiences due to social distancing measures), and the film's source material and lead cast members having relatively low name recognition, and its release on HBO Max. The film fell 60% in its second weekend, grossing $4.5 million and finishing in sixth.

=== Streaming viewership ===
According to Samba TV, the film was streamed on HBO Max by 693,000 households over its first three days of release, lower than previous day-in-date Warner Bros. titles like Mortal Kombat (3.8 million) and The Conjuring: The Devil Made Me Do It (1.6 million). Research firm Screen Engine reported the film was the third-most streamed film across all platforms in its opening weekend behind Mortal Kombat (which was available via PVOD) and Awake. By the end of its first month, the film had been streamed in over 1.7 million U.S. households.

=== Critical response ===
On review aggregator website Rotten Tomatoes, In the Heights holds an approval rating of 94% based on 372 reviews with an average rating of 8.2/10. The website's critics consensus reads, "Lights up for In the Heights, a joyous celebration of heritage and community fueled by dazzling direction and singalong songs." On Metacritic, the film has a weighted average score of 84 out of 100 based on 55 critics, indicating "universal acclaim". Audiences polled by CinemaScore gave the film an average grade of "A" on an A+ to F scale, while PostTrak reported 88% of audience members gave it a positive score, with 67% saying they would definitely recommend it.

Monica Castillo of TheWrap wrote: "Like Crazy Rich Asians, not everyone is going to feel represented when they watch In the Heights. That's an impossible task for any movie. Yet In the Heights can represent many things for many different viewers. It can be a story about ambitious, hard-working people chasing their dreams. It can be a reflection on the immigrant experience and the struggle to find where you belong. It can also be a tribute to our parents' sacrifices." From The Hollywood Reporter, David Rooney said: "The movie glows with an abundance of love for its characters, their milieu and the pride with which they defend their cultural footprint against the encroaching forces of New York development that continually shove the marginalized further into the margins. The resilience with which the characters claim their place in the fabric of city life is exhilarating."

In his review for Variety, Peter Debruge praised Chu's direction and wrote: "Like its source, the movie is a blast, one that benefits enormously from being shot on the streets of Washington Heights." IndieWire's David Ehrlich gave the film an A−, saying: "So exuberant and full of life that it would probably convince you the movies were back even if they hadn't gone anywhere, In the Heights is the kind of electrifying theatrical experience that people have been waxing nostalgic about ever since the pandemic began — the kind that it almost seemed like we might never get to enjoy again... Seeing this massive, guileless, heartfelt piece of Hollywood entertainment on the big screen is like coming home after a long year in exile only to find that it's still there, and maybe even better than you remembered."

A. O. Scott of The New York Times gave the film a positive review, writing that "It's a piece of mainstream American entertainment in the best sense — an assertion of impatience and faith, a celebration of communal ties and individual gumption, a testimony to the power of art to turn struggles into the stuff of dreams." From The A.V. Club, Danette Chavez wrote "In The Heights' slice-of-life portraiture suggests a less ambitious undertaking than Hamilton, but it tells a story as expansive as that of a fledgling nation. Through both musicals, Miranda demonstrates how ingrained people of color are in this country's history: Before he reimagined a pivotal chapter in United States history with Black and Latino actors, the acclaimed multi-hyphenate threw a spotlight on marginalized people's fight against displacement. At the core of In The Heights, on stage or screen, is movement—as migration, as immigration, as dancing, as code-switching, as the shift from friends to lovers."

Filmmaker Adele Lim, who worked with Chu on the screenplay of Crazy Rich Asians, praised the film, saying "In a world with a seemingly limitless appetite for superhero action or meditations on personal violence, Chu’s vision is an unapologetic throwback to the joyful, large-scale musicals of Kelly, Astaire and George Sidney: a pure, dazzling celebration of the best of us."

There was slight criticism in terms of the changes to the character of Vanessa. In an article titled "The Generic Latinidad of In the Heights" from The New Yorker, author Frances Negrón-Muntaner states, "The choice to contain Vanessa implies that one does not need to flee downtown and escape one's roots to succeed. That's true enough, but in staying put Vanessa seems to give up her big dreams of crossing over, for man, child, and bodega." K. Austin Collins of Rolling Stone rated the film three and a half out of five stars. He praised the setting, music, and cast performances of the film, and also wrote that "In The Heights spins its lively, complicated tale. An aspirational immigrant story, but flows and overlaps and grows dense in unexpected ways. In both Miranda and Chu's trademark style, this is all threaded together with life spilling into the streets, musical numbers that fold reality into fantasy with an aplomb that's as pleasurable as it is overwhelming."

=== Legacy ===
In 2023, it ranked number 16 on Time Out's list of "The 40 Best Musical Movies of All Time," saying that it "radiates with love for its predominantly Dominican American characters and the pride they take in preserving their small corner of the big city." It also ranked number 17 on Screen Rant's list of "The 20 Best Musicals of All Time" and number 41 on Parade's list of the "67 Best Movie Musicals of All Time." MovieWeb ranked it at number 3 on its list of the "Best Recent Musical Movies," calling it "a great example of adapting a stage performance into a movie the right way" and that it "still captures all the necessary essence of the stage version and simultaneously breathes new life into the musical movie genre." IndieWire ranked it at number 42 on its list of "The 60 Best Movie Musicals of All Time," with David Ehrlich writing that Jon M. Chu "created a film that makes you feel like its characters are dreaming with their eyes open. And while there may be no Cassiopeia in Washington Heights, a star is born in this movie every time someone appears onscreen... nothing will ever dim the memory of the instant classic that brought them all together." It also ranked number 3 on /Film's list of "The 14 Greatest Movie Musicals of the 21st Century," describing the musical sequences as "acts of magical realism, an artistic movement that was popularized by Latin American artists in the 1950s - one that is fitting for the movie's characters, setting, and subject matter, as well as inventive for the movie musical form." In February 2025, The Washington Post ranked In the Heights at number 6 on its list of "The 25 best movie musicals of the 21st century," with Ty Burr writing "Undeservedly lost in the hosannas for Hamilton (which reached home screens as a filmed teleplay rather than a proper movie), this film adaptation of Lin-Manuel Miranda's earlier hit is a near-perfect stage-to-screen transfer, a classically structured "street scene" musical with yearning performances, soaring songs and the ethno-rhythmic stew of New York's gentrifying Washington Heights: merengue, bachata, samba, bomba and plena."

=== Accusations of colorism ===
The film's casting was accused of colorism by seeming to exclude Afro-Latino actors with darker skin tones, and hence misrepresenting the demographics of Washington Heights. Miranda publicly apologized shortly after the film's release. Appearing on The Daily Show, he stressed that while "there's so much Afro-Latinidad in the movie, the beef really was specifically dark-skinned Afro-Latinos in leading roles... and I totally understand that and I receive it and I just have to do better on the next one." Lead actor Ramos also accepted the criticism, stating in an interview with the Associated Press that "there's no debate about it."

Actress Rita Moreno defended Miranda during an interview on The Late Show with Stephen Colbert, saying: "It's like you can never do right, it seems... This is the man who literally has brought Latino-ness and Puerto Rican-ness to American [entertainment. ...] They're really attacking the wrong person." The National Association of Hispanic Journalists called Moreno's comments "unacceptable". She walked back her remarks, later stating, "I was clearly dismissive of Black lives that matter in our Latin community. It is so easy to forget how celebration for some is lament for others".

=== Accolades ===
Award	Date of ceremony	Category	Recipients	Results	Ref.
National Hispanic Media Coalition Impact Awards	November 28, 2020	Visionary Impact Award	In the Heights	Won	
Hollywood Critics Association Midseason Awards	July 1, 2021	Best Picture	In the Heights	Won	
Hollywood Critics Association Midseason Awards	July 1, 2021	Best Actor	Anthony Ramos	Won	
Hollywood Critics Association Midseason Awards	July 1, 2021	Best Actress	Melissa Barrera	Nominated	
Hollywood Critics Association Midseason Awards	July 1, 2021	Best Supporting Actor	Corey Hawkins	Nominated	
Hollywood Critics Association Midseason Awards	July 1, 2021	Best Supporting Actor	Jimmy Smits	Nominated	
Hollywood Critics Association Midseason Awards	July 1, 2021	Best Supporting Actress	Leslie Grace	Nominated	
Hollywood Critics Association Midseason Awards	July 1, 2021	Best Supporting Actress	Olga Merediz	Nominated	
Hollywood Critics Association Midseason Awards	July 1, 2021	Best Filmmaker	Jon M. Chu	Won	
Hollywood Critics Association Midseason Awards	July 1, 2021	Best Screenplay	Quiara Alegría Hudes	Nominated	
Hollywood Music in Media Awards	November 17, 2021	Best Music Themed Film – Biopic or Musical	In the Heights	Nominated	
Hollywood Music in Media Awards	November 17, 2021	Original Song – Onscreen Performance	Anthony Ramos and Leslie Grace featuring Marc Anthony – ("Home All Summer")	Nominated	
Detroit Film Critics Society Awards	December 6, 2021	Best Adapted Screenplay	Quiara Alegría Hudes	Nominated	
Detroit Film Critics Society Awards	December 6, 2021	Best Use of Music	In the Heights	Nominated	
Golden Globe Awards	January 9, 2022	Best Actor – Motion Picture Musical or Comedy	Anthony Ramos	Nominated	
Seattle Film Critics Society Awards	January 17, 2022	Best Picture	In the Heights	Nominated	
Seattle Film Critics Society Awards	January 17, 2022	Best Ensemble Cast	Bernard Telsey, Tiffany Little Canfield	Nominated	
Seattle Film Critics Society Awards	January 17, 2022	Best Action Choreography	In the Heights	Won	
Golden Tomato Awards	January 31, 2022	Best Musical & Music Movie	In the Heights	Won	
Hollywood Make-up Artist and Hair Stylist Guild Awards	February 19, 2022	Best Contemporary Hair Styling – Feature-Length Motion Picture	Betsy Reyes, Valerie Velez, Annemarie Bradley-Sherron, Dierdre Harris	Nominated	
Hollywood Critics Association Awards	February 27, 2022	Best Comedy/Musical Film	In the Heights	Nominated	
Black Reel Awards	February 28, 2022	Outstanding Breakthrough Performance, Male	Anthony Ramos	Won	
Black Reel Awards	February 28, 2022	Outstanding Screenplay, Adapted or Original	Quiara Alegría Hudes	Nominated	
Black Reel Awards	February 28, 2022	Outstanding Ensemble	Bernard Telsey, Tiffany Little Canfield	Nominated	
Black Reel Awards	February 28, 2022	Outstanding Original Score	Alex Lacamoire, Bill Sherman and Greg Wells	Nominated	
Black Reel Awards	February 28, 2022	Outstanding First Screenplay	Quiara Alegría Hudes	Nominated	
Black Reel Awards	February 28, 2022	Outstanding Cinematography	Alice Brooks	Nominated	
Black Reel Awards	February 28, 2022	Outstanding Production Design	Nelson Coates	Nominated	
ADG Excellence in Production Design Awards	March 5, 2022	Excellence in Production Design for a Contemporary Film	Nelson Coates	Nominated	
Costume Designers Guild Awards	March 10, 2022	Excellence in Contemporary Film	Mitchell Travers	Nominated	
Casting Society of America	March 23, 2022	Feature Big Budget – Comedy	Bernard Telsey, Tiffany Little Canfield, Kristian Charbonier	Nominated	
Satellite Awards	April 2, 2022	Best Motion Picture – Comedy or Musical	In the Heights	Nominated	
Satellite Awards	April 2, 2022	Best Actor – Motion Picture Comedy or Musical	Anthony Ramos	Nominated	
Satellite Awards	April 2, 2022	Best Actress – Motion Picture Comedy or Musical	Melissa Barrera	Nominated	
Grammy Awards	April 3, 2022	Best Compilation Soundtrack for Visual Media	Various artists	Nominated	
Imagen Awards	October 2, 2022	Best Feature Film	In the Heights	Nominated	
Imagen Awards	October 2, 2022	Best Actor – Feature Film	Anthony Ramos	Nominated	
Imagen Awards	October 2, 2022	Best Actress – Feature Film	Leslie Grace	Nominated	

== See also ==
- Dominican Americans
- Nuyorican
- Puerto Ricans in New York City
