= When the Sun Goes Down =

When the Sun Goes Down may refer to:

== Albums ==
- When the Sun Goes Down (Kenny Chesney album), or the title song (see below), 2004
- When the Sun Goes Down (Selena Gomez & the Scene album), or the title song, 2011
- When the Sun Goes Down, by Ernestine Anderson, 1985
- When the Sun Goes Down, or the title song, by Red 7, 1987
- When the Sun Goes Down 1934–1941, by Leroy Carr, 2011

== Songs ==
- "When the Sun Goes Down" (Arctic Monkeys song), 2006
- "When the Sun Goes Down" (Kenny Chesney song), 2004
- "When the Sun Goes Down", by DJ Fresh and Adam F from Jungle Sound: The Bassline Strikes Back!
- "When the Sun Goes Down", by Screwball from Loyalty
- "When the Sun Goes Down", from the musical In the Heights

== See also ==
- Sun Goes Down (disambiguation)
- When That Evening Sun Goes Down (disambiguation)
