= Mandy Gonzalez =

American actress and singer (born 1978)

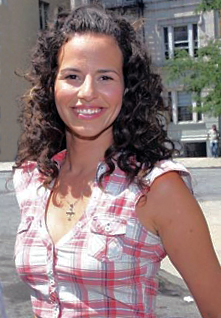
- Born: Mandy Vera Gonzalez; August 22, 1978 (age 48); Santa Clarita, California, U.S.
- Other name: The Beast
- Occupations: Actress, singer
- Years active: 2001–present
- Spouse: Douglas Melini
- Children: 1
- Website: www.mandygonzalez.com

Mandy Gonzalez (born August 22, 1978) is an American actress and singer, best known for her leading roles on Broadway. She originated the role of Nina Rosario in the Off-Broadway and Broadway productions of the musical In the Heights. In 2010 and 2011, she played Elphaba in the Broadway production of Wicked. She also played Angelica Schuyler in the Broadway cast of Hamilton for a six-year run, from 2016 to 2022. In 2024, she joined the cast as the alternate Norma Desmond in Jamie Lloyd's Broadway revival of Sunset Boulevard.

== Early life and education ==
Gonzalez was born and raised in Santa Clarita, California. Her father is Mexican and her mother is Jewish (of Polish and Romanian origin). She attended Saugus High School. She is also a 1996 YoungArts alumnus. Then, she attended the California Institute of the Arts for one year. Gonzalez then worked as a background singer for Bette Midler's The Divine Miss Millennium Tour (1999–2000). After that she moved to New York City, where she worked as a coat check attendant while attending open calls.

== Theatre career ==
Prior to her appearances on Broadway, Gonzalez appeared in the off-Broadway production of Eli's Comin', a musical which was based on the lyrics and music of songwriter Laura Nyro that ran off-Broadway in 2001. Gonzalez won an Obie Award for her performance.

In 2001, Gonzalez made her debut on Broadway in the role of Princess Amneris in the Tim Rice/Elton John musical Aida as the standby for Idina Menzel. In 2002, she played the role of Sarah in the short-lived Broadway musical Dance of the Vampires. She returned to Aida in 2003, as Amneris, opposite Toni Braxton and Will Chase.

In 2005, Gonzalez appeared in the Broadway musical Lennon, based on the life of John Lennon and Yoko Ono, She played multiple roles, including Lennon himself. The show played a limited 91 performances on Broadway.

After originating the role in the Off-Broadway production that received the Drama Desk Award for Outstanding Ensemble Performances, Gonzalez again starred as Nina Rosario in the original Broadway cast of In the Heights.

Gonzalez had previously been offered the role of Elphaba on the first national tour of Wicked, which she would have taken over from Shoshana Bean in January 2007; instead, she declined in order to star in In the Heights, with the role of Elphaba going instead to Victoria Matlock. In 2010, the opportunity finally arose for her to play Elphaba in the Broadway production of Wicked. She replaced Dee Roscioli on March 23, 2010. Not long into her run as the green witch, she won the 2010 Broadway.com Audience Award for Best Female Replacement. On January 30, 2011, she gave her final performance in the role, after which she was replaced by Teal Wicks. Gonzalez also had previously appeared in the ensemble in one of the musical's first readings.

In September 2016, Gonzalez joined the Broadway cast of Hamilton as Angelica Schuyler Church, replacing Renée Elise Goldsberry. In September 2026, she performed at the MetLife Stadium in a Hamilton medley, reprising her role of Angelica. The performance was during a New York Giants NFL halftime show to commemorate the twenty-fifth anniversary of 9/11.

In April 2019, Gonzalez appeared in the John F. Kennedy Center's production of The Who's Tommy as Mrs. Walker. The production, being part of their Broadway Center Stage series, ran a limited run roughly a week long.

In October 2024, she began performances as Nicole Scherzinger's alternate in the Broadway revival and transfer of Jamie Lloyd's production of Sunset Boulevard at the St. James Theatre.

== Film and television ==
Gonzalez appeared on television in The Good Wife, Third Watch, Guiding Light, and Madam Secretary. Her films include Across the Universe (directed by Julie Taymor), Background vocals in In the Heights, and Pieter Gaspersz' After.

In 2016, Gonzalez starred in the ABC thriller Quantico playing the recurring role of Agent Susan Coombs.

In 2021, Gonzalez had a guest appearance in season 1, episode 6 of the Hulu original series Only Murders in the Building, playing the character Mabel Mora's mother, Silvia.

In November 2023, Gonzalez appeared in Salute to Service: A Veterans Day Salute on PBS, hosted by Jon Stewart. Mandy sang a song "Fearless" based on her parents courtship, sight unseen, as pen pals writing for the year her father served in Vietnam, and her mother was a stateside 17 year old volunteer pen pal to soldiers.

== Recording career ==
Gonzalez can be heard on the original Broadway cast recording of In the Heights and in the Disney animated film Mulan II as the singing voice of Su.

She released her first solo album, Fearless, on October 20, 2017. The title song was written by Lin-Manuel Miranda, creator and star of In the Heights and Hamilton. The song "Fearless" tells the story of how her parents fell in love as pen-pals during the Vietnam War, and of the #FearlessSquad. The album's seven tracks also include songs written by Bill Sherman, Jennifer Nettles, and Tom Kitt. It includes an acoustic version of her signature In The Heights song "Breathe", a remake of the classic song "Que Sera, Sera", and "Life Is Sweet", a duet with Christopher Jackson, her In the Heights and Hamilton co-star and longtime friend.

Gonzalez debuted her solo show, also titled Fearless, at the Cafe Carlyle for two weeks from October 24 to November 4, 2017. She performed songs from her album as well as many others. Many of her In the Heights friends visited onstage, such as Karen Olivo, Janet Dacal, Priscilla Lopez and Lin-Manuel Miranda. Christopher Jackson joined her as an opening night surprise; he joined her on her final show as well.

== Theatre credits ==
Year(s)	Production	Role	Location	Category
2001–2002	Aida	Amneris (Standby)	Palace Theatre	Broadway
2002–2003	Dance of the Vampires	Sarah	Minskoff Theatre	Broadway
2003–2004	Aida	Amneris	Palace Theatre	Broadway
2005	Lennon	Mandy	Broadhurst Theatre	Broadway
2007	In the Heights	Nina Rosario	37 Arts Theatre	Off-Broadway
2008–2010	In the Heights	Nina Rosario	Richard Rodgers Theatre	Broadway
2010–2011	Wicked	Elphaba	Gershwin Theatre	Broadway
2013	In the Heights	Nina Rosario	United Palace	Reunion concert
2016–2022	Hamilton	Angelica Schuyler	Richard Rodgers Theatre	Broadway
2019	The Who's Tommy	Mrs. Walker	The John F. Kennedy Center for The Performing Arts	Regional
2024–2025	Sunset Boulevard	Norma Desmond	St. James Theatre	Broadway
2026	Basura	Monica	Alliance Theatre	Regional
