= Javier Muñoz (actor) =

American actor and singer

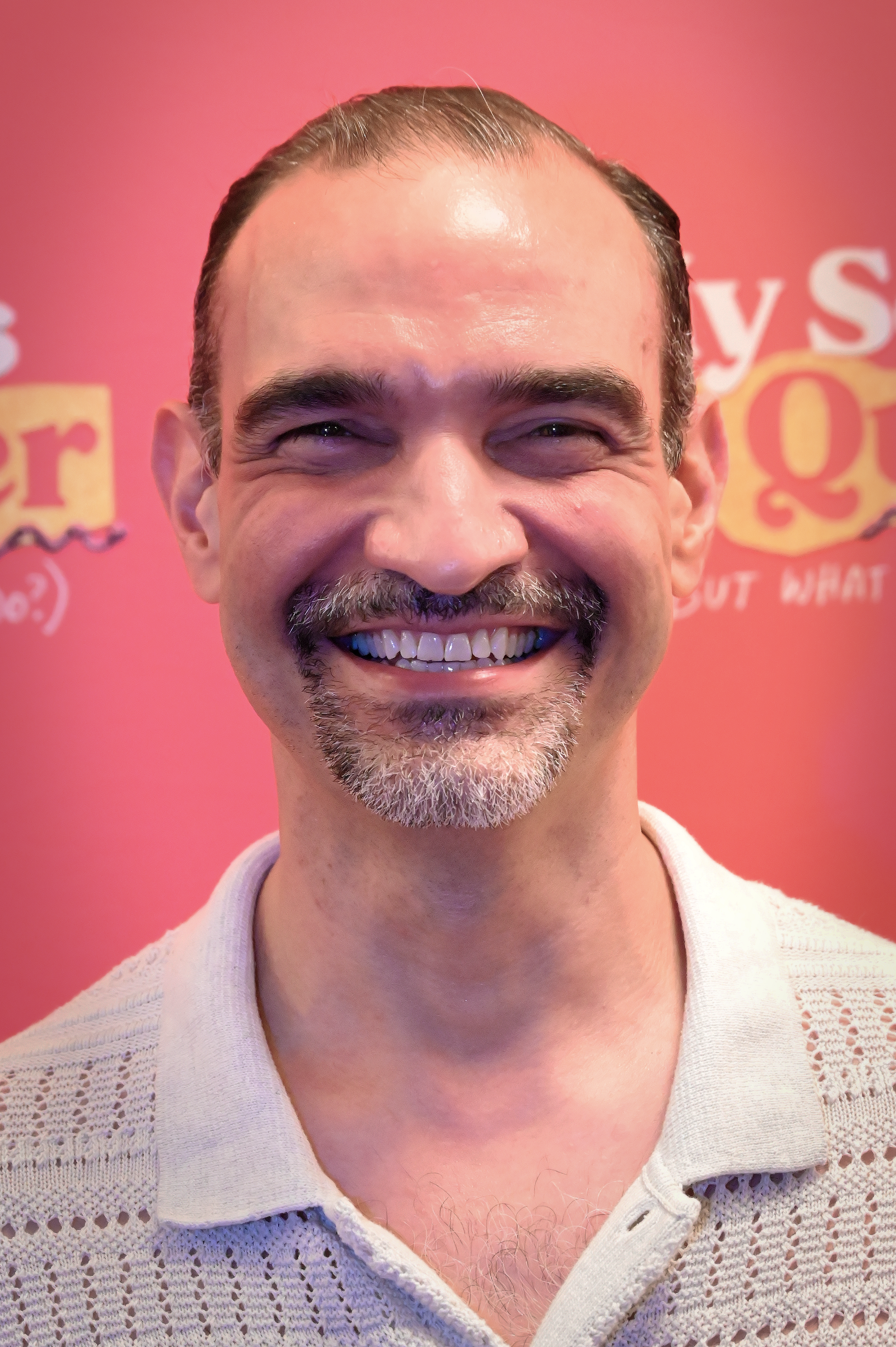
- Muñoz in 2025
- Education: New York University (BFA)
- Occupations: Actor; singer
- Known for: In the Heights; Hamilton

Javier Muñoz is an American actor and singer. He is most notable for his Broadway performances as Usnavi de la Vega in the 2008 musical In the Heights and Alexander Hamilton in the 2015 musical Hamilton, in which he played the title role from July 11, 2016, until January 14, 2018.

== Early life and education ==
Muñoz was born to a Puerto Rican family and raised in the Linden projects of East New York, Brooklyn. He was the youngest of four sons, and the only of his siblings to pursue a professional career in the arts.

He attended Edward R. Murrow High School, where he participated in the drama club known as the Players' Circle. He went on to earn his Bachelor of Fine Arts from New York University, where he participated in Collaborative Arts Project 21.

== Career ==
Muñoz's early roles include Ziad in Kari Floren's The Porch at Altered Stages in New York and other off-Broadway productions. He was in the 2006 New York Musical Theatre Festival production of All Is Love. He abandoned acting and took a full-time job as a manager at the restaurant 44 1/2 in Hell's Kitchen before he landed a role in In the Heights. His role was cut from the show during rehearsals, but he stayed on as a member of the ensemble.

On February 16, 2009, Muñoz took the male lead of Usnavi de la Vega in In the Heights. Theater critic Robert Feldberg wrote that he preferred Muñoz in the role over Lin-Manuel Miranda, stating that the romance between Usnavi and Vanessa seemed "more believable" and the performance was "emotionally persuasive".

In 2015, Muñoz began performing as an alternate for the role of Alexander Hamilton in Miranda's Broadway production of Hamilton. By spring 2016, he appeared in the role every Sunday and on select weekdays. He played the role of Hamilton the night President Barack Obama and his family attended the show. He assumed the role full-time on July 11, 2016. He was temporarily replaced by Jevon McFerrin following a February 2017 injury, and returned on March 21, 2017.

In 2017, he joined the panel of Justin Baldoni's talk show Man Enough.

On August 2, 2017, he made a guest appearance in a musical skit on Full Frontal with Samantha Bee, where he played the role of an immigrant affected by Kris Kobach's anti-immigration efforts.

In 2018, Muñoz was announced as a recurring guest star on the third season of Shadowhunters.

In 2025, Muñoz was cast as Robert Baker in Wonderful Town at New York City Center as part of their Encores! series.

From December 2025 to February 2026, Muñoz portrayed Nate in Wonder the Musical, based on the novel Wonder by R. J. Palacio.

== Personal life ==
Muñoz is a gay man, a cancer survivor, and has been living with HIV since 2002.

On October 15, 2017, Muñoz became part of the MeToo movement, sharing that he had been a victim multiple times.

In March 2018, Muñoz received backlash following tweets where he lashed out, seemingly unprovoked, at fans. He issued a public apology in April, noting that the phrasing of a tweet caused him to recall an incident where he received anonymous hate mail at his building, leading to fear and distress.

== Filmography ==
=== Films ===
Year	Title	Role	Notes
2013	The House That Jack Built	Hector	
2013	Papa's Prince	Javier / Prince	Short film
2021	In the Heights	Washington Heights Resident	
2022	Three Months	Dr. Diaz	

=== Television ===
Year	Title	Role	Notes
2016	Odd Mom Out	Waiter	Episode: "Hamming It Up"
2017	Quantico	Gabriel Carrera	Episode: "JMPALM"
2017	Blindspot	Marc Gelman	Episode: "Draw O Caesar, Erase a Coward"
2017	Full Frontal with Samantha Bee	Becky City Man	Episode: "August 2, 2017"
2018	Elena of Avalor	Duke Cristobal (voice)	Episode: "Song of The Sirenas"
2018–2019	Shadowhunters	Lorenzo Rey	7 episodes
2022	Eureka!	Ohm (voice)	Main role; 24 episodes

== Theatre credits ==
Year	Title	Role	Notes
2001	Assassins	Giuseppe Zangara	Lesher Center for the Arts
2005	In the Heights	Usnavi de la Vega	Eugene O'Neill Theater Center
2008–2009	In the Heights	Ensemble / Usnavi de la Vega (standby)	Richard Rodgers Theatre
2009	In the Heights	Usnavi de la Vega	Richard Rodgers Theatre
2009–2010	In the Heights	Usnavi de la Vega	National tour
2013	Hamilton	John Laurens / Samuel Seabury	Vassar College, Workshop
2014	Into the Woods	The Baker	Oregon Shakespeare Festival
2015–2016	Hamilton	Alexander Hamilton (alternate)	Richard Rodgers Theatre
2016–2018	Hamilton	Alexander Hamilton	Richard Rodgers Theatre
2022	The Devil Wears Prada	Nigel Owens	James M. Nederlander Theatre
2024	Galileo	Cardinal Morosini	Berkeley Repertory Theatre
2024	Faust	The Lord	The Soraya
2025	Schmigadoon!	Doc Jorge Lopez	Kennedy Center
2025	Wonderful Town	Robert Baker	New York City Center, Encores!
2025	Wonder the Musical	Nate Pullman	American Repertory Theater
2026	Into the Woods	The Baker	Cape Playhouse
2026	Galileo	Cardinal Morosini	Shubert Theatre

== See also ==
- LGBT culture in New York City
- List of LGBT people from New York City
- NYC Pride March
