= Joseph Morales =

American actor

- Born: Joseph Alexander Morales; 1982 or 1983 (age 42–43); New Mexico, U.S.
- Occupation(s): Actor, singer
- Years active: 2003–present

Joseph Alexander Morales is an American stage and TV actor, known for starring as Alexander Hamilton in the musical Hamilton's Chicago production and second national touring production.

== Early life ==
Joseph Morales was born in New Mexico. Ethnically, Morales is half-Mexican through his biological father, one-quarter German-Irish, and one-quarter Japanese. The father who raised him, Command Sgt. Major James Blankenbecler, was killed in action in 2003 while serving in the U.S. Army during the Iraq War.

As part of a military family, Morales moved frequently during his childhood, living in Virginia, Texas, and Hawaii. He encountered the Oregon Shakespeare Festival during a high school trip to Medford, Oregon, and made a decision to study theater at Southern Oregon University. After one year, he dropped out to begin auditioning for roles in New York.

== Career ==
From October 2009 to July 2010, Morales performed with the National Tour of Lin-Manuel Miranda's musical In the Heights, as a member of the ensemble and as understudy for Usnavi, Piragua Guy, and Sonny. He was then chosen to star in the show's first national tour, as Miranda's replacement in the lead role of Usnavi, which he played from July 25, 2010, to April 3, 2011.

After touring in the cast of Bombay Dreams, Morales appeared in the national tour of If/Then from October 2015 to August 2016.

On March 10, 2017, Morales joined the Chicago company of Hamilton, as alternate in the role of Alexander Hamilton. Later that year, Hamilton producer Jeffrey Seller announced that Morales had been chosen to lead the show's second national tour in the title role, starring alongside Nik Walker as Aaron Burr. His first show as title player on the Philip Tour was February 6, 2018 in Seattle.

His television credits include Colony (2016) and Chicago Med (2017).

== Filmography ==
=== Film ===
- Indigo (2003) as Boy in cafe (uncredited)
- Eating Out 2: Sloppy Seconds (2006) as Derek

=== Television ===
| Year | Title | Role | Notes |
|---|---|---|---|
| 2009–2010 | Wiener & Wiener | Lance | 5 episodes |
| 2015 | Comedy Corner | Joe | Episode: "Ballet Resume" |
| 2015 | Rules of Engagement | Lance | Episode: "I Spy" |
| 2015 | One and Only | Charlie | Episode: "Our Final Hour" |
| 2016 | Colony | Heller | 2 episodes |
| 2017 | Chicago Med | Chad Rawls | Episode: "Ctrl Alt" |
