= Sarah Naudi =

Maltese actress and writer

Sarah Naudi is a Maltese stage, film, and television actress. She is best known for playing Vanessa in In the Heights at London's Charing Cross Theatre in 2016.

== Early and personal life ==
Naudi was born with a club foot and struggled with mobility following an operation. Naudi was interested in performing since age three, when she began ballet lessons. She studied musical theatre at Stagecoach Theatre Arts School in Malta.

Naudi is married.

== Career ==
=== Stage ===
In 2004, Naudi was a member of the Young Talent Team, a performing group of eight teenagers who represented Malta at the Junior Eurovision Song Contest in Lillehammer, Norway.

Naudi played Sanddy in Porn: The Musical when it played at the Edinburgh Festival Fringe in 2009. She joined the cast after its premiere in Malta earlier that year. She returned to the role in 2014, when the show played at the newly-opened Pjazza Teatru Rjal in Valletta.

Naudi joined the cast of the London premiere of Lin-Manuel Miranda's In the Heights in 2015. The show ran first at the Southwark Playhouse and then moved to the Charing Cross Theatre, with Naudi playing Carla at the premiere. She took over the role of Vanessa in late 2016. At the 2016 Olivier Awards, In the Heights won in three categories, Outstanding Achievement Musical Contribution, Best Choreographer for Drew McOnie and Best Supporting Actor for David Bedella.

Naudi was part of the cast of the revival of Jamie Lloyd Evita at the Open Air Theatre in Regent Park in 2019. The production was led by Samantha Pauly as Eva Perón, Frances Mayli McCann as Peron's mistress and Trent Saunders as Che.

=== Film and television ===
Naudi has appeared in a few episodes of television, including Foundation (Apple TV), Litvinenko (Channel 5), and Mood (BBC).

Naudi has worked with director Keith Tedesco since 2015, with the two having been friends for years before that. She appeared in his 2016 short film In the Name of Bjorn.

Naudi wrote the mini-series The Home Straight, which follows a young Maltese runner whose career is threatened by a foot injury. Originally written as a feature film, Naudi later retooled the script for the mini-series format. The series would be directed by Keith Tedesco, with Naudi playing the series' protagonist. Naudi and Tedesco launched a Kickstarter campaign in 2022 to fund the project, with plans to begin filming in 2023 if they reached their funding goals. The series received €94,000 from the Malta Film Commission's Creative Malta scheme in 2023. The series was in post-production as of March 2025.

== Credits ==
=== Stage ===
Year	Title	Role	Theatre	Ref
2009	Porn: The Musical	Sanddy	George 4 Theatre (Edinburgh Fringe)	
2015 - 2016	In the Heights	Carla/ Vanessa	Southwark Playhouse and Charing Cross Theatre	
2019	Evita	Ensemble	Regent's Park Open Air Theatre	

=== Film and TV ===
Year	Title	Role	Notes	Ref
2011	Presagi		TV movie	
2015	By the Sea	Grocery clerk	Movie	
2016	In the Name of Bjorn	Lore	Short	
2020	The Madame Blanc Mysteries	Sarah Newman	TV Series - 1 episode	
2021	Foundation	Maiden Zephyr	TV Series - 1 episode	
2022	Mood	Giuliana	TV mini-series, 1 episode	
2022	Litvinenko	Dr Justine Adams	TV mini-series, 2 episodes	
	The Home Straight	Serena	in post-production	
