= Douglas Melini =

- Education: CalArts
- Occupation: Painter
- Spouse: Mandy Gonzalez

Douglas Melini is a New York City and New Jersey based American painter and a CalArts alumnus.

== Career ==
Melini's paintings are combinations of patterned optical illusions and painterly abstract expression that explore the relationship between color, texture, and space. He often extends his patterns and vibrant colors across the frame, adding a third-dimension to the work. In more recent works, Melini has explored layering different textures over his signature geometric patterns with thick paint strokes. His once completely abstract work has become more pictorial in nature, referencing the landscape. Melini holds an MFA from California Institute of the Arts.

Melini's first solo show in NYC was at the historical White Columns, where the artist showed a 63 foot long painting that was hung wall to wall in one of the galleries' famous white rooms.

Melini was represented by the famous and groundbreaking gallery Feature Inc. until the death of Hudson (the gallery's owner and creator) in 2014. The artist is currently represented by VanDoren Waxter with locations on the Lower East Side and Uptown. Other shows include PS1, Long Island City, New York, The Suburban Oak Park, Illinois, Richard Heller Gallery, Los Angeles, CC Andraxt, Mallorca, Spain, The Rocket Gallery, London, The Daimler Collection, Berlin, Germany.

He has received grants from Marie Walsh Sharpe Foundation Studio Residency, NYFA Fellowship in Painting, Change Inc. Melini's work has been shown all over the country and world and it is included in numerous private and public collections such as: The Daimler Collection, Berlin, Germany, Neuberger Berman LLC, New York, NY, The Progressive Corporation, Cleveland, Ohio, The Phillip Schrager Collection, Omaha, Nebraska, Wellspring Capital Corporation, New York, NY.

Douglas Melini paintings are a fusion of various art movements like Minimalism and Pattern and Decoration. This is described as "This odd couple meets in jagged, symmetrical patchworks that reprise the Minimalist grid in patterns that resemble fabrics, specifically the checks, plaids and tattersalls of shirts, vests, handkerchiefs and jacket linings. A fastidious, distinctly physical sense of craft prevails, with a tolerance for little drips and slurps of paint that softens its slight obsessiveness." by Roberta Smith of The New York Times. Taut surfaces in his works are described as "dizzyingly intricate" which is credited to the array of pictorial references that have been built into them.

== Personal life ==
Douglas Melini is married to the actress Mandy Gonzalez.
