= Sun Goes Down =

Sun Goes Down may refer to:

- "Sun Goes Down" (David Guetta and Showtek song), 2015
- "Sun Goes Down" (David Jordan song), 2008
- "Sun Goes Down" (Lil Nas X song), 2021
- "Sun Goes Down" (Nesian Mystik song), 2010
- "Sun Goes Down" (Robin Schulz song), 2014
- "The Sun Goes Down" (Thin Lizzy song), 1983
- "The Sun Goes Down (Living It Up)", a song by Level 42, 1983
- "Sun Goes Down", a song by Deep Purple from Bananas
- "Sun Goes Down", a song by Icona Pop from Icona Pop
- "Sun Goes Down", a song by The Futureheads from The Chaos

== See also ==
- When the Sun Goes Down (disambiguation)
