= Seth Stewart =

American actor

Seth Stewart is an American actor, singer and dancer known for his roles in the musicals Hamilton (2015) and In the Heights (2008, cameo in 2021 film adaptation). Other film appearances include Music and Lyrics (2007), Britney: For the Record (2008) and Friends with Benefits (2011).

== Early life ==
Stewart is from Kent, Ohio, and of mixed ancestry. As a boy, Stewart played football and wrestled, but always wanted to act. He studied dance starting at age 10 at the James Dance and Performing Arts Center in Howland, and then with Inna Stabrova and Dmitri Tuboltsev at the Ohio Youth Ballet as a teen. He graduated from Theodore Roosevelt High School in 2002 and started the Fordham University/Alvin Ailey School BFA program, leaving prior to graduating. He attended The Ailey School of the Alvin Ailey American Dance Theater for a year and a half.

== Career ==
=== In the Heights: 2008 Broadway ===
Stewart originated the role of "Graffiti Pete" in the musical In the Heights. He appeared in the original production, which premiered Off-Broadway at 37 Arts in January 2007 in previews. The New York Times reviewer wrote of his performance: "A particular standout is Seth Stewart, playing a sweet-hearted graffiti artist, who seems to have little springboards in his sneakers." He appeared in the original Broadway production from February 14, 2008, to August 25, 2009, and then returned for a four-week engagement from June 7, 2010, to July 3, 2010.

=== Hamilton ===
In the musical, Stewart was part of the ensemble cast and was as an understudy to Daveed Diggs for the roles of Marquis de Lafayette and Thomas Jefferson. In September 2016, he assumed both roles on a permanent basis. He left the production in April 2017, when he was replaced by James Monroe Iglehart.

== Theater credits ==
Year	Title	Role	Theatre
2005	Sweet Charity	Ensemble	Al Hirschfeld Theatre
2008	In the Heights	Graffiti Pete	Richard Rogers Theatre
2015	Hamilton	Ensemble u/s Marquis de Lafayette / Thomas Jefferson	Richard Rogers Theatre
2016-17	Hamilton	Marquis de Lafayette / Thomas Jefferson	Richard Rogers Theatre

== Filmography ==
Year	Title	Role	Notes
2004	I'm Going to Tell You a Secret	himself	Documentary chronicling Madonna's Re-invention World Tour
2011	Friends with Benefits	Dancer	
2012	Smash	Dancer	TV series
2016	The Karma Club	Owen Parker	
2020	Hamilton	Ensemble	Filmed recording of the 2016 Broadway musical
2021	In the Heights	Bartender	Cameo

== Other works ==
In addition to theater and appearances in movies, Stewart has been on tour with Jennifer Lopez and Madonna. In addition to that, Stewart has starred in Paula DeAnda's music video "Walk Away (Remember Me)" as DeAnda's ex-boyfriend as well as Jay Z.

In 2025 Stewart self-published a memoir, entitled Follow Your Vision, Live Your Truth (PublishDrive, 2025).

== Awards and honors ==
In 2014 Stewart was inducted into the Kent City Schools Hall of Fame.
