= Doreen Montalvo =

American actress (1963–2020)

- Montalvo in 2020
- Born: November 15, 1963; Bronx, New York, U.S.
- Died: October 17, 2020 (aged 56); United States
- Occupation(s): Actress, singer, playwright
- Years active: 1990–2020
- Spouse: Michael Mann (m. 2010)

Doreen Montalvo (November 15, 1963 – October 17, 2020) was an American actress. She was best known for being part of the original cast of the musical In the Heights.

== Early life ==
Doreen Montalvo was born in the Bronx, on November 15, 1963, the daughter of Puerto Rican immigrants. She was also one of three children.

== Career ==
Montalvo made her broadway debut in 2008 in In the Heights.

== Personal life ==
Montalvo married stage actor Michael Mann in 2010.

=== Death ===
Montalvo died after a brief illness on October 17, 2020. She suffered a stroke weeks before.

== Stage credits ==
Year	Title	Role	Notes
2007-2011	In the Heights	Bolero Singer, Ensemble, u/s Abuela Claudia, Carla, Daniela	Off-Broadway and Broadway
2012	Giant	Lupe	
2014	Flashdance	Ensemble	National Tour
2015	On Your Feet	Nena, Lucia, Ensemble, u/s Gloria	]
2017	Curvy Widow	Heidi	
2020	Mrs. Doubtfire	Janet Lundy, Ensemble	

== Filmography ==
Year	Title	Role	Notes
2021	In the Heights	Neighborhood Lady	Posthumous release
2021	West Side Story	Demonstrator	Posthumous release
	Fosse/Verdon		
2017–2019	Madam Secretary	FBI Agent #2	Episodes: "Persona Non Grata" and "Daisy"
2006	Law & Order	Marita	Episode: "Heart of Darkness"
	The Good Wife		
	Smash		
	One Life to Live		
	Elementary		
