= Janet Dacal =

American actress

- Born: Los Angeles, California, U.S.
- Education: Florida International University
- Occupations: Actress, singer, performer
- Years active: 2004–present
- Known for: Carla, In the Heights (2007); Alice, Wonderland (2011)
- Awards: Drama Desk Award (In the Heights, 2007)
- Website: www.janetdacal.com

Janet Dacal (/dəˈkɔːl/ də-CAWL;) born in Los Angeles, California) is an American actress, singer, and performer in musical theatre. She received the Drama Desk Award for her performance in the Broadway musical In the Heights.

== Early life ==
Dacal's parents are from the La Vibora neighborhood of Havana, Cuba, though she was born and grew up in Los Angeles. In an interview, Dacal said, "My mom says that when I was four, I would grab a brush and pretend to sing songs into a microphone . . . I was the little girl of the family, and they loved to see me dance around and make people laugh." In Los Angeles, Dacal attended a performing arts middle school and high school. Dacal moved to Miami when she was 17, where she continued to be involved in the arts. After graduating from Coral Park High School, she attend Florida International University, initially pursuing a theater degree but later switching to a communications degree. In college, she worked in the recording studios of Emilio and Gloria Estefan and eventually other Latin pop stars. She discovered her passion for theater after she performed in the Miami production of Four Guys Named Jose…and Una Mujer Named Maria.

== Career ==
In 2004, Dacal made her Broadway debut in the original cast of Good Vibrations. She then originated the role of beauty salon worker Carla in the 2007 off-Broadway musical In the Heights, for which she won a Drama Desk Award. Dacal reprised this role for the musical's 2008 Broadway transfer. In addition to playing Carla, she understudied Karen Olivo as Vanessa and Mandy Gonzalez as Nina and had gone on for both roles.

She has appeared in a Musicals Tonight! concert in New York City, and also performed with the cast of In the Heights at the "Broadway in Bryant Park" festival in July 2009. She returned to In the Heights on February 19, 2010, as Nina Rosario, playing her last performance in August 2010.

Dacal appeared in the Off-Broadway production of Byzantium. Regionally, she has appeared in a South Florida production of Five Course Love, for which she received a Carbonell Award nomination.

At the 2011 Outback Bowl, held on January 1, 2011, in Tampa, Florida, Dacal performed "The Star-Spangled Banner". She participated in the Young People's Chorus fundraising gala, titled Dreamer, at the Frederick P. Rose Hall in the Lincoln Center for the Performing Arts on March 7, 2011.

Dacal then starred in several out-of-town tryouts of the musical Wonderland, for which she received encouraging reviews. The Sarasota Herald-Tribune wrote that she had "a strong voice and presence." Dacal reprised her role as Alice in the Broadway production of the musical at the Marquis Theatre, which began performances in March 2011. However, after negative reviews and bad ticket sales, the production closed on May 15, 2011.

From July to November 2017, Dacal starred in the limited-run musical Prince of Broadway where she was a leading performer.

From January 3, 2020, until the March 2020 coronavirus shutdown, Dacal played Dina in the national tour of The Band's Visit. She resumed playing Dina when the tour restarted in autumn 2021.

== Recordings ==
In 2007, she provided background vocals for the album Mi tiempo by Chayanne. Dacal can also be heard on the cast recordings of In the Heights (2008), Wonderland (2011), and Prince of Broadway (2018). In an interview, she stated that she hopes to collaborate on a solo album with Wonderland composer Frank Wildhorn, although no official plan has been made.
