= When That Evening Sun Goes Down =

When That Evening Sun Goes Down or When the Evening Sun Goes Down may refer to:

- "When That Evening Sun Goes Down", a song by Van Morrison on the 1971 album Tupelo Honey
- "When the Evening Sun Goes Down", a song by Half Man Half Biscuit on the 2002 album Cammell Laird Social Club
- "When the evening sun goes down", a key line from "Night Life" (Willie Nelson song) of 1960
