= In the Heights =

2005 musical by Lin-Manuel Miranda

- Broadway promotional poster
- Music: Lin-Manuel Miranda
- Lyrics: Lin-Manuel Miranda
- Book: Quiara Alegría Hudes
- Concept: Lin-Manuel Miranda
- Premiere: July 23, 2005: Eugene O'Neill Theater Center, Waterford, Connecticut
- Productions: 2005 Waterford; 2007 Off-Broadway; 2008 Broadway; 2009 US tour 2015 London
- Awards: Tony Award for Best Musical; Tony Award for Best Original Score; Grammy Award for Best Musical Show Album; Laurence Olivier Award for Outstanding Achievement in Music; Obie Award

In the Heights is a musical with concept, music, and lyrics by Lin-Manuel Miranda and a book by Quiara Alegría Hudes. The story is a romance as well as a celebration of community, culture, and aspirations. It is set over the course of three days, involving characters in the largely Hispanic and Latino neighborhood of Washington Heights in Upper Manhattan, New York City. The score blends hip-hop, salsa, merengue, and soul.

After a 2005 tryout in Waterford, Connecticut and a 2007 Off-Broadway run, the show opened on Broadway in March 2008. It was nominated for thirteen Tony Awards and won four, including Best Musical. A film adaptation of the musical was released in June 2021.

== Synopsis ==
=== Act 1 ===
As the sun rises on the hottest day of the summer, Usnavi de la Vega, the owner of a small bodega in Washington Heights, chases away a small-time vandal, Graffiti Pete, before introducing the audience to the corner he lives on and some of its many residents: Abuela Claudia, an elderly Cuban immigrant who raised Usnavi after the death of his parents; Sonny, Usnavi's younger cousin who works in the bodega; Daniela and Carla, who own the local salon; Kevin and Camila Rosario, a married couple who own the cab company; Benny, Usnavi's longtime best friend and an employee at the cab company; and Vanessa, an employee at the salon and aspiring fashion designer ("In the Heights").

As the day begins, the Rosarios' daughter, Nina, arrives home from her first year at Stanford University. Often considered the "one who made it out" and the pride of the corner, Nina dreads telling her parents and neighbors the truth of her return home: that she dropped out of Stanford because she had to work two jobs to maintain her tuition, leading to her getting poor grades and losing her scholarship ("Breathe"). As she tries to find her parents to tell them the news, she runs into Benny. Clearly harboring latent romantic feelings for one another, Benny and Nina reconnect ("Benny's Dispatch").

Elsewhere, Vanessa dreams of one day leaving the corner and getting an apartment in the West Village ("It Won't Be Long Now"). While she is on a break at the salon, Sonny asks her out on a date on Usnavi's behalf, and she accepts; Usnavi rejoices at his success, as he has been in love with Vanessa for years. However, he worries that Vanessa may forget about him and the rest of the community when she moves.

Nina reunites with her parents and is ultimately forced to reveal that she dropped out. Her parents are stunned at this revelation, as well as her dishonesty. Kevin grows devastated that he has been unable to provide for his family, fearing that he has continued the cycle started by his father, a poor tenant farmer ("Inútil"). Nina goes to the salon to seek comfort from Vanessa, but Daniela and Carla insist on giving Nina a makeover and subjecting her to their gossip about the happenings in the neighborhood, specifically regarding Benny and Usnavi. Daniela, Carla, and Vanessa then praise Nina and her successes. Nina reluctantly reveals to them that she dropped out, then leaves exasperatedly. ("No Me Diga").

As Usnavi closes up shop, he, Benny, Sonny, and Graffiti Pete discover that the bodega has sold a winning lottery ticket worth $96,000. The news gets out and the entire block begins to fantasize about what they would do if they had that much money ("96,000"). After the excitement dissipates, Abuela Claudia sits down to feed the birds and reminisces about her childhood in Cuba and her life in relative poverty, and the events that have led her to where she is today. She reveals that she holds the winning lottery ticket, and expresses gratitude for her patience and faith ("Paciencia y Fe").

Benny comforts Nina by walking with her and discussing their memories of growing up in the neighborhood. Nina expresses her doubts about her own self-worth to Benny, but he reassures her that she is destined for greatness ("When You're Home"). As they head to Nina's house for dinner, the local piragua merchant (referred to in the script as "Piragua Guy") pushes his food cart through the neighborhood, but all of his prospective customers would rather buy frozen treats from a nearby Mister Softee truck ("Piragua").

Kevin and Camila host Nina, Benny, Usnavi, Vanessa, and Abuela Claudia for dinner, where Kevin announces that he has sold the car service to pay for Nina's tuition. Nina and Camila are shocked. Benny, who had been dreaming of eventually managing the car service, is outraged and confronts Kevin over his decision. Kevin insists that Rosario's is a family business, and he does not consider Benny to be part of his family. Benny is furious and abruptly leaves. Nina, refusing to accept Kevin's money, follows Benny.

Usnavi soon arrives at a local nightclub for his date with Vanessa, but is overly nervous and aloof. Vanessa begins dancing with other men, aiming to make Usnavi jealous. In response, Usnavi dances with another woman as an attempt to make Vanessa jealous. Nina follows Benny to the club to apologize for Kevin's decision. Benny, already drunk, angrily brushes her off. Tensions rise in the club as the two couples cope with their own jealousy, culminating in Benny punching a man dancing with Nina, causing a fight to break out ("The Club"). Suddenly, the power goes out throughout the city as a result of the intense heat and humidity. The neighborhood descends into chaos as Usnavi and Vanessa, as well as Benny and Nina, desperately try to find their way back to one another. Sonny and Graffiti Pete, fearing looters, set off fireworks to distract potential robbers as well as to light everyone else's way home. Usnavi reunites with Abuela Claudia, who reveals her lottery ticket to him. Benny and Nina find each other amid the chaos, and despite initially arguing, they finally kiss ("Blackout").

=== Act 2 ===
Kevin spends the night searching for Nina, who is spending the night with Benny in Benny's apartment. Benny worries about whether Kevin will approve of him dating Nina, but is happy to spend time with Nina regardless ("Sunrise"). Usnavi's bodega has been robbed. Usnavi convenes with Abuela Claudia to discuss what will happen with the money. Abuela Claudia decides to give Sonny and Usnavi each a third of the money and urges Usnavi to use his money to achieve his lifelong dream of returning to his home in the Dominican Republic. While Usnavi shares some doubts, he eventually decides to go ("Hundreds of Stories"). Nina eventually returns home, and discovers her parents have been frantically searching for her. Kevin grows furious when he learns Nina was with Benny and disapproves of their relationship, partially because he wants Nina to date a Latino man, which Benny is not. Nina and Kevin loudly argue before Camila intervenes, criticizing Kevin for throwing Benny out and Nina for not coming home. She urges them to come together and work things out as a family ("Enough").

As the neighborhood copes with their frustration over the heat and blackout, Daniela urges them to dispel the negativity and muster up enough energy for a neighborhood celebration. Daniela leads the crowd in playfully teasing Vanessa for not realizing Usnavi's feelings for her, and Benny for his tryst with Nina the previous night. Usnavi arrives and announces that Abuela Claudia had won the lottery, and that he has booked a flight for the Dominican Republic, which will leave the following day. Vanessa is visibly upset by the news of Usnavi's impending departure. Sonny is upset by that news and the news of Nina's relationship with Benny, as Sonny had a crush on Nina himself. Usnavi calms Sonny down by revealing that he and Abuela Claudia are giving him third of the lottery winnings. Usnavi encourages the neighborhood residents to celebrate before everything changes ("Carnaval del Barrio").

During the celebration, Nina arrives and pulls Usnavi offstage. Kevin makes an announcement over the dispatch: Abuela Claudia has suddenly died ("Atención"). Usnavi holds an impromptu memorial for Abuela Claudia, revealing that she died of "a combination of the stress and heat," and Nina leads the entire block in mourning Abuela Claudia ("Alabanza"). Afterward, Usnavi and Nina go through Abuela's old photographs to reminisce. Nina begins to remember the central role Abuela Claudia played in her education and motivation, and in memory of Abuela, she resolves to accept her parents' money and give college another try, returning to Stanford at the end of the summer ("Everything I Know"). As Vanessa prepares to move out, Daniela gives her a final piece of news: Usnavi convinced Daniela to cosign Vanessa's lease for her new apartment ("No Me Diga (Reprise)"). As the blackout continues, many neighborhood residents patronize the Piragua Guy, partially because the Mister Softee truck broke down; the Piragua Guy is overjoyed to finally have good business ("Piragua (Reprise)").

Overwhelmed by his kind act, Vanessa visits Usnavi as he cleans up the bodega. She flirts with him and offers him a bottle of champagne. She quietly suggests to him that he should stay in the neighborhood, saying that if he leaves, she will never see him again. Usnavi, overwhelmed, firmly decides to leave. Vanessa kisses him, lamenting that she was too late in realizing her feelings for him ("Champagne"). As Nina tells Benny of her decision, they agree to spend the summer together before pursuing a long-distance relationship when she returns to school; Benny reaffirms his faith in her, and they promise to keep contacting each other ("When The Sun Goes Down"). Benny confronts Kevin for a final time, insisting that he was always there for him while Kevin never did the same. As the night winds down, Sonny approaches Graffiti Pete with a secret proposition, which Pete accepts.

The next morning, the neighborhood has visibly changed: the car service sign over the Rosarios' building has been removed, and the grate in front of the bodega is still open. As Usnavi listens to Abuela Claudia's old records, he accepts that the neighborhood has changed and wonders if any of his neighbors in Washington Heights will miss him after he leaves. Sonny approaches Usnavi and, having fixed the bodega's grate, pulls it down, revealing a graffiti mural of Abuela Claudia painted by Pete. Seeing the mural, Usnavi has an epiphany and tells Sonny and Pete to inform the neighborhood that he is not leaving. As he reflects on his role as the neighborhood's storyteller, Usnavi ponders a potential future with Vanessa, declares he will commit himself to protecting the legacy of his family (as well as Abuela Claudia), and accepts Washington Heights as his true home ("Finale").

== Musical numbers ==
Act I

- "In the Heights" – Usnavi, Kevin, Camila, Daniela, Carla, Sonny, Benny, Vanessa, Piragua Guy, Abuela Claudia and Company
- "Breathe" – Nina, Piragua Guy, Cuca, and Company
- "Benny's Dispatch" – Benny and Nina
- "It Won't Be Long Now" – Vanessa, Usnavi, and Sonny
- "Inútil (Useless)" – Kevin
- "No Me Diga (You Don't Say)" – Daniela, Carla, Vanessa, and Nina
- "96,000" – Usnavi, Benny, Sonny, Graffiti Pete, Daniela, Carla, Vanessa, and Company
- "Paciencia y Fe (Patience and Faith)" – Abuela Claudia and Company
- "When You're Home" – Nina, Benny, and Company
- "Piragua" – Piragua Guy
- "Siempre (Always)" – Camila and Bolero Singer †
- "The Club" – Usnavi, Vanessa, Benny, Nina, and Company
- "Blackout" – Usnavi, Benny, Sonny, Kevin, Vanessa, Nina, Graffiti Pete, Daniela, Carla, Abuela Claudia, and Company

Act II

- "Sunrise" – Nina, Benny, and Company
- "Hundreds of Stories" – Abuela Claudia and Usnavi
- "Enough" – Camila
- "Carnaval del Barrio" – Daniela, Carla, Piragua Guy, Vanessa, Usnavi, Benny, Sonny, and Company
- "Atención" – Kevin
- "Alabanza"(Praise) – Usnavi, Nina, and Company
- "Everything I Know" – Nina
- "No Me Diga (Reprise)" – Daniela, Carla, and Vanessa †
- "Piragua (Reprise)" – Piragua Guy
- "Champagne" – Vanessa and Usnavi
- "When the Sun Goes Down" – Nina and Benny
- "Finale" – Usnavi, Bolero Singer, Daniela, Carla, Piragua Guy, Kevin, Camila, Vanessa, and Company

† Designates number not included on the original cast recording

== Characters ==
- Usnavi de la Vega is the narrator of the musical's exposition and a major character throughout; he is the owner of a small bodega in Washington Heights called De La Vega Bodega. He was originally played by Lin-Manuel Miranda, songwriter of the musical. He was named after one of the first sights his parents saw when they arrived in America, a ship with the sign "US Navy" on it. Abuela Claudia, the neighborhood matriarch, "practically raised" him when his parents both died during his early childhood. He dreams of moving to the Dominican Republic. He is in love with Vanessa.
- Nina Rosario is an intelligent girl, the first in her family to go to college (Stanford University), and everyone in the barrio admires her as the "one who made it out." However, she returns home from school for the summer to reluctantly tell her parents that she has become overburdened and dropped out. She is the typical "good girl" and always got along with her parents. Upon arriving back home, though, she loses patience constantly over her father's overprotectiveness and his refusal to accept Benny, with whom she gets into a romantic relationship.
- Benny works at the dispatch of Nina's father, Kevin. The only character in the play who does not speak Spanish, Benny falls in love with Nina. He dreams of opening his own business.
- Vanessa García is Usnavi's love interest who works at Daniela's salon. She is stunningly beautiful and catches the eye of every guy in the Heights; however, she takes interest in Usnavi. She lives with an alcoholic mother and dreams of getting out of the barrio and getting an apartment downtown but cannot yet afford it.
- Abuela Claudia (“abuela" means "grandmother" in Spanish) is the loving matriarch of the barrio who is like a grandmother to all. She is the one who looked after Usnavi when his parents died. She and her mother moved from Cuba to New York in 1943 while she was a child. She worked as a maid for several years but never earned the money for her and her mother to travel home.
- Sonny de la Vega is Usnavi's younger cousin who works with Usnavi in the bodega. He is a jokester, and has an intelligent and thoughtful side that yearns for social justice.
- Daniela is the owner of the salon where the neighborhood girls come to gossip. She is very bold and loud and loves to banter.
- Carla works at Daniela's salon along with Vanessa, and is Daniela's close friend; young and pretty, but a little slow to get the others' jokes and innuendos, she is of Chilean, Cuban, Dominican, and Puerto Rican descent.
- Kevin Rosario is Nina's overprotective father, who, coming from a long line of farmers, has worked hard to resist following in his own father's footsteps. He now owns his own taxi cab service: Rosario's.
- Camila Rosario is Nina's strong-willed mother, who wants what is best for Nina. She is typically tolerant of Kevin's control issues, but in the course of the show, reveals her real feelings.
- Piragua Guy (Piragüero) is the owner of a small piragua stand that competes with Mister Softee.
- Graffiti Pete is a graffiti artist. He is good friends with Sonny and is one of the few characters who acknowledge Sonny's dreams. Usnavi believes Pete is a trouble-making vandal (constantly referring to him as a 'punk'), until Pete reveals his amazing skills as an artist.
- Cuca is a bold, fashionable, and full of attitude Washington Heights resident. She most notably has a small solo in the song "Breathe". The character was originally an unnamed background ensemble member, until Book writer Quiara Alegría Hudes gave her a name in honor of her original actress Doreen Montalvo's involvement and commitment to the show both on and off-Broadway from 2007–2011.

== Cast and characters ==
Character	Connecticut	Off-Broadway	Broadway	First US tour	West End	Kennedy Center
Character	2005	2007	2008	2009	2015	2018
Usnavi De La Vega	Javier Muñoz	Lin-Manuel Miranda	Lin-Manuel Miranda	Kyle Beltran	Sam Mackay	Anthony Ramos
Nina Rosario	Natalie Cortez	Mandy Gonzalez	Mandy Gonzalez	Arielle Jacobs	Lily Frazer	Ana Villafañe
Benny	Christopher Jackson	Christopher Jackson	Christopher Jackson	Rogelio Douglas Jr.	Joe Aaron Reid	J. Quinton Johnson
Vanessa	Sheena Marie Ortiz	Karen Olivo	Karen Olivo	Yvette González-Nacer	Jade Ewen	Vanessa Hudgens
Abuela Claudia	Doreen Montalvo	Olga Merediz	Olga Merediz	Elise Santora	Eve Polycarpou	Saundra Santiago
Kevin Rosario	Rick Negron	John Herrera	Carlos Gómez	Danny Bolero	David Bedella	Rick Negron
Camila Rosario	Nancy Ticotin	Priscilla Lopez	Priscilla Lopez	Natalie Toro	Josie Benson	Blanca Camacho
Sonny	Robin de Jesús	Robin de Jesús	Robin de Jesús	Shaun Taylor-Corbett	Cleve September	Mateo Ferro
Daniela	Monica Salazar	Andréa Burns	Andréa Burns	Isabel Santiago	Victoria Hamilton-Barritt	Eden Espinosa
Carla	Janet Dacal	Janet Dacal	Janet Dacal	Genny Lis Padilla	Sarah Naudi	Arianna Rosario
Graffiti Pete	Matt Saldivar	Seth Stewart	Seth Stewart	Jose-Luis Lopez	Antoine Murray-Straughan	Virgil Gadson
Piragua Guy (Piragüero)	Matt Saldivar	Eliseo Román	Eliseo Román	David Baida	Vas Constanti	Eliseo Roman

=== Notable Broadway replacements ===
- Usnavi – Javier Muñoz, Corbin Bleu
- Nina – Janet Dacal, Jordin Sparks, Arielle Jacobs
- Vanessa – Marcy Harriell
- Daniela – Justina Machado, Bianca Marroquín
- Sonny – David Del Rio, Jon Rua
- Carla – Gabrielle Ruiz
- Graffiti Pete – Jon Rua

=== Notable US tour replacements ===
- Usnavi – Lin-Manuel Miranda, Joseph Morales
- Benny – Nicholas Christopher
- Vanessa – Lexi Lawson

=== Notable West End replacements ===
- Vanessa – Christine Allado
- Daniela – Aimie Atkinson

== Background ==
Miranda wrote the earliest draft of In the Heights in 1999 during his sophomore year of college. After the show was accepted by Wesleyan University's student theater company Second Stage, Miranda added "freestyle rap ... bodegas, and salsa numbers." It played from April 27 to 29, 2000, as an 80-minute, one-act show that reportedly sounded like "A hip-hop version of Rent". After seeing the play, two Wesleyan seniors and two alumni, John Buffalo Mailer, Neil Patrick Stewart, Anthony Veneziale and Thomas Kail, approached Miranda and asked if the play could be expanded with a view to a Broadway production. Miranda started working with director Kail in 2002 and wrote five separate drafts of In the Heights. Book writer Quiara Alegría Hudes joined the team in 2004.

== Productions ==
=== Connecticut (2005) and off-Broadway (2007) tryouts ===
A new version of In the Heights was presented at the National Music Theater Conference at the Eugene O'Neill Theater Center in Waterford, Connecticut between July 23 and July 31, 2005, directed by Thomas Kail and with music director Alex Lacamoire. The cast featured Natalie Cortez, Janet Dacal, Robin de Jesús, Huey Dunbar, Christopher Jackson, Doreen Montalvo, Javier Muñoz, Rick Negron, Sheena Marie Ortiz, Matt Saldivar, Monica Salazar, and Nancy Ticotin

The musical then opened at the 37 Arts Theater off-Broadway, running from February 8, 2007, through July 15, 2007. Directed by Thomas Kail, with choreography by Andy Blankenbuehler and music direction by Alex Lacamoire, it was produced by Jill Furman, Kevin McCollum, Jeffrey Seller and Sander Jacobs. The off-Broadway production was nominated for nine Drama Desk Awards, winning two, as well as winning the Outer Critics' Circle Award for Outstanding Musical.

=== Broadway (2008–2011) ===
The musical premiered on Broadway, starting in previews on February 14, 2008, with an official opening on March 9, 2008, at the Richard Rodgers Theatre. The Broadway production was again directed and choreographed by Kail and Blankenbuehler, with most of the off-Broadway principals reprising their roles. The creative team included set design by Anna Louizos, costume design by Paul Tazewell, lighting design by Howell Binkley, sound design by Acme Sound Partners, arrangements and orchestrations by Alex Lacamoire and Bill Sherman, and music coordination by Michael Keller.

The producers announced on January 8, 2009, that the show had recouped its $10 million investment after 10 months. The cast recording was released on June 3, 2008, by Ghostlight Records and won the Grammy Award for Best Musical Show Album, beating the recordings of The Little Mermaid, Young Frankenstein, and the revivals of Gypsy and South Pacific. The Broadway production celebrated its 1000th performance on August 2, 2010.

The Broadway production closed on January 9, 2011, after 29 previews and 1,184 regular performances. The final cast included Lin-Manuel Miranda, Arielle Jacobs, Marcy Harriell, Shaun Taylor-Corbett, Olga Merediz, Andréa Burns, Christopher Jackson, Tony Chriroldes, Priscilla Lopez, and Jon Rua (understudy for the roles of Usnavi and Sonny for most of 2010).

=== North American tour (2009–2011) ===
The first national tour of In the Heights began on October 27, 2009, in Tampa, Florida. The musical ran in San Juan, Puerto Rico in November 2010, the first time an Equity tour has played in the city. Librettist Hudes and songwriter-star Miranda are both of Puerto Rican descent. Miranda played this engagement. The tour closed on April 3, 2011, at the Adrienne Arsht Center for the Performing Arts in Miami, Florida. At the time of its closing, the tour starred Joseph Morales as Usnavi.

=== Manila, Philippines (2011) ===
The international premiere ran in Manila, Philippines, from September 2 to 18, 2011. The new production was directed by Bobby Garcia and starred Nyoy Volante as Usnavi, Ima Castro as Vanessa, K-La Rivera as Nina Rosario, Felix Rivera as Benny, Calvin Millado as Kevin Rosario, Jackie Lou Blanco as Camila Rosario, Tex Ordoñez as Daniela, Tanya Manalang as Carla, Bibo Reyes as Sonny, and Jay Glorioso as Abuela Claudia. The show had a repeat run in March 2012.

=== Non-Equity US tour (2011–2012) ===
A non-Equity United States national tour of In the Heights ran from October 17, 2011, until June 2012. The tour played in Chicago in January 2012, with Virginia Cavaliere as Nina, Presilah Nunez as Vanessa, Kyle Carter as Benny, and Perry Young as Usnavi.

=== Panama City, Panama (2013) and São Paulo, Brazil (2014) ===
In Panama, In The Heights was performed by Instituto Alberto Einstein's student body from June 20 to June 25, notable performances by Valerie Cohen, Isidoro Cherem and Alegrita Angel, acting was made entirely in Spanish and songs sang in their original lyrics. Carnaval del Barrio (In the Heights) was staged at the famed Teatro en Círculo, from the October 3 to 31, 2013, produced by Top Line Events and directed by Aaron Zebede, who also adapted the book and songs to Spanglish. Jose "Pepe" Casis was the musical director, who also played the part of Piragua Guy.

The Brazilian premiere of Nas Alturas was staged at Teatro Bradesco from April 17 until May 25, 2014. The cast featured Myra Ruiz (Nina), Ricardo Marques (Benny), Mauro Gorini (Kevin), Germana Guilherme (Camila), Renata Brás (Daniela), Milena Martines (Carla), Lola Fanucchi (Vanessa), Thiago Vianna (Graffiti) and Rafael Dantas (Piragua Guy).

=== Off-West End, United Kingdom (2014) ===
The UK premiere of In The Heights was staged at Southwark Playhouse from 9 May until June 7, 2014. The cast featured Sam Mackay as Usnavi, Christina Modestou as Nina, Emma Kingston as Vanessa, David Bedella as Kevin Rosario and Victoria Hamilton-Barritt as Daniela, with direction by Luke Sheppard and costumes by Gabriella Slade.

=== Tokyo, Japan (2014) ===
The Japanese premiere played in Bunkamura's Theatre Cocoon from April 9 until April 20, 2014, and featured Yuya Matsushita, Ayaka Umeda, Chihiro Otsuka, and Motomu Azaki, among others.

=== Melbourne, Australia (2015) ===
The Australian premiere of In The Heights, produced by StageArt, opened at Chapel Off Chapel on Feb 20 and ran for a short season of 21 shows, closing on March 8. Directed by James Cutler, Musical Direction by Cameron Thomas and choreographed by Yvette Lee, Starring Stephen Lopez in the lead role of Usnavi. The show received overwhelming critical acclaim.

=== London return (2015–2017) ===
Poster for the 2015 London production

In the Heights transferred to the King's Cross theatre, London on October 3, 2015. The production was directed by Luke Sheppard, choreographed by Drew McOnie with musical supervision by Tom Deering. The production was nominated for four awards at the 2016 Olivier Awards: Best New Musical, Best Theatre Choreographer (Drew McOnie), Outstanding Achievement in Music and Best Actor in a Supporting Role in a Musical (David Bedella). The performance of the production at the Olivier Awards was introduced by Jonathan Groff, in character as King George from Miranda's musical Hamilton. Following the end of his run in Hamilton, composer Lin-Manuel Miranda made a surprise visit to the production on September 4, 2016, while he was in London working on Mary Poppins Returns. The production closed on January 8, 2017, after a hugely successful run; with several extensions from its initial 4 month limited run. The final show was concluded with speeches by actor Sam Mackay and producer Paul Taylor Mills, and a surprise appearance by Lin-Manuel Miranda.

=== Vancouver, Canada and Seoul, South Korea (2015) ===
The Canadian premiere of In the Heights, produced by The Arts Club, opened at the Stanley Industrial Alliance Stage on May 6, 2015. Directed by Bill Millerd with co-direction and choreography by Lisa Stevens and musical direction by Ken Cormier. The cast featured Luc Roderique as Usnavi, Elena Juatco as Vanessa, Kate Blackburn as Nina, Chris Sams as Benny, Sharon Crandall as Abuela Claudia, Caleb Di Pomponio as Sonny, Francisco Trujillo as Kevin, Caitriona Murphy as Camila, Irene Karas Loeper as Daniela, Julia Harnett as Carla, Michael Culp as Graffiti Pete and Michael Antonakos as Piragua Guy.

The South Korean production opened in the Samsung Card Hall, Blue Square, Seoul on September 4, 2015. The production was scheduled to star numerous K-pop and hip-hop musicians including Jeong Won-young, Yang Dong-geun, Jang Dongwoo of Infinite, and Key from Shinee as Usnavi, Seo Kyeong-su, Kim Sung-kyu of Infinite, and Chen from EXO as Benny, and Kim Bo-kyeong, Luna of f(x) as Nina.

=== Lima, Peru (2016) ===
Los Productores presented In the Heights during the first months of 2016. The premiere took place on January 20, 2016, at Luigi Pirandello Theater. The composition of the cast does not match those characteristics that the original work proposed. While the original work proposed racial diversity as an essential feature, the Peruvian version has a cast composed mainly of actors with white ancestry and not one single actor with Indigenous background. Gisela Ponce de León, a member of the cast, said, "Peruvians are experts in self-managed racism."

=== Lohne, Germany (2016) ===
The first ever German performance took place in May and June 2016 in Lohne and was an amateur production by the local high school. The musical was translated by Laura Friedrich Tejero and directed by Rainer Eschner and Stefan Middendorf.

=== US Spanish Premiere (2017) ===
Directed and choreographed by Luis Salgado, a member of the original Broadway Cast, and Assistant Latin Choreographer to Mr. Blankenbuehler, and presented by GALA Hispanic Theater, In The Heights had its Spanish Premiere in the US in April 2017. While Spanish-language versions of In the Heights have been produced in Latin America, this production is distinctive for several reasons: It is the first Spanish version of the show in the United States, it is the first Spanish translation sanctioned and approved by Lin-Manuel Miranda, and it is directed and choreographed by Luis Salgado, Assistant Latin Choreographer on the original Broadway production of In the Heights. The production included lyrics and scenes in Spanish, with elements from the original English, as well as an English anchor through the character of Benny. The production offered English and Spanish subtitles.

The production combined a varied Spanish speaking cast from countries including the Dominican Republic, Venezuela, Spain, Colombia, Peru, Mexico, Puerto Rico, Switzerland and the USA. It starred Juan Luis Espinal (Usnavi), Verónica Álvarez Robles (Vanessa), Laura Lebrón (Nina), Vaugh Midder (Benny), Scheherazade Quiroga (Daniela), Shadia Fairuz (Camila), Rafael Beato (Sonny), Michelle Ríos (Abuela Claudia), José Fernando Capellán (Kevin), Gabriella Pérez (Carla), Myriam Gadri (Graffity Pete) and Felix Marchany (Piragua Guy). The ensemble included: Ximena Salgado, Melinette Pallares, Natalia Raigosa, Amaya Perea, Aaron Cobos, José Ozuna and Hector Flores. The production garnered 18 nominations to the 2018 Helen Hayes Awards (the DC equivalent to the Tony Awards), more than any other DC production in the season, including Best Musical, Best Ensemble, Best Director, Best Choreography, Best Actor, Best Actress, Best Supporting Actress and Best Supporting Actor among others.

=== Nyborg, Denmark (2018) ===
The first ever Nordic performance took place in January and February 2018 at Bastionen theatre in Nyborg, Denmark. It was an amateur production by the Musical Talent School of Nyborg. It was translated into Danish and directed by Jesper Nielsen.

=== Saltillo, Mexico (2019) ===
The musical premiered in May 2019, in Teatro Fernando Soler. It was a semi-professional production in Spanish directed by Saul Martínez and produced by Cuarta Pared Teatro.

=== New Orleans, Louisiana, U.S.A., Regional Premiere (October 7–16, 2022) ===
Produced by the Jefferson Performing Arts Society, directed and choreographed by Michelle Pietri with Assistant Choreographer AJ Hernandez, In The Heights had its Regional Premiere in The Jefferson Performing Arts Center on October 7, 2022. Maestro Dennis Assaf conducted The Jefferson Performing Arts Society Pit Orchestra.

The Scenic Designer was Eric Porter, the Lighting Designer was Jonathan Michael Gonzales and the Sound Designer was Kage Laney. The Wigs and Makeup Designer was Amanda Bravender, the Costume Designer was Arturo Hernandez Jr., and the Props Designer was Olivia Winter. Mona Naswari was the Stage Manager.

The production combined a varied Spanish speaking cast from countries including the Dominican Republic, Venezuela, Colombia, Peru, Mexico, Puerto Rico, and Cuba. It starred Alcee Jones (Usnavi), Gia Martinez (Vanessa), Kelly Laines (Nina), Neal Eli (Benny), Skylar Broussard (Daniela), Elizabeth Lowry (Camila), Claudio Venancio (Sonny), Elana Polin (Abuela Claudia), Paul Bello (Kevin), Rachel Carter (Carla), Clarence Smith (Graffity Pete) and Adriel Aviles (Piragua Guy). The ensemble included: Gabriella Vazquez Harlamert (Dance Captain), Aubry Snipes, Graciela Gonzales, Aaliyah Thompson, Alejandra Dollis, Shiquita Brooks, Yorkel Ballesteros, David Hidalgo, Cal Desmith, Fransheska Peña, Joshua "Juice" Hernandez, AJ Hernandez, Aleyla Ybarra, Sophia Christilles and Stefan Armando Hernandez-San Martin.

=== Koszalin, Poland (2022) ===
The first ever Polish performance directed by Kacper Wojcieszek took place on 24 September 2022 in Koszalin's Musical Theater "Adria" (Teatr Muzyczny Adria).

=== Australian return (2024–2025) ===
A production of In The Heights performed at the Sydney Opera House in July 2024, starring Ryan González (Usnavi) and Olivia Vásquez (Vanessa).

The musical returned to Melbourne in August 2025, at the Comedy Theatre, Melbourne. In addition to Olivia Vásquez and Ryan González. The show's cast included Ngali Shaw (Benny), Maria Gonzalez (Nina), Steve Costi (Sonny), and Lena Cruz (Abuela Claudia).

This cast took the show to Gold Coast, Queensland in September 2025, performing at HOTA, Home Of The Arts.

=== Off-Broadway revival (2026) ===
New York City Center staged a revival of the show from October 28 to November 15, 2026, as part of its Off-Broadway Gala series. David Mendizábal directed.

== Awards and nominations ==
=== Original Off-Broadway production ===
Year	Award Ceremony	Category	Nominee	Result
2007	Drama Desk Award	Outstanding Musical		Nominated
2007	Drama Desk Award	Outstanding Ensemble Performance		Won
2007	Drama Desk Award	Outstanding Director of a Musical	Thomas Kail	Nominated
2007	Drama Desk Award	Outstanding Choreography	Andy Blankenbuehler	Won
2007	Drama Desk Award	Outstanding Music	Lin-Manuel Miranda	Nominated
2007	Drama Desk Award	Outstanding Lyrics	Lin-Manuel Miranda	Nominated
2007	Drama Desk Award	Outstanding Orchestrations	Alex Lacamoire and Bill Sherman	Nominated
2007	Drama Desk Award	Outstanding Set Design	Anna Louizos	Nominated
2007	Drama Desk Award	Outstanding Sound Design	Acme Sound Partners	Nominated
2007	Clarence Derwent Award	Most Promising Male Performer	Lin-Manuel Miranda	Won

=== Original Broadway production ===
Year	Award Ceremony	Category	Nominee	Result
2008	Tony Award	Best Musical		Won
2008	Tony Award	Best Book of a Musical	Quiara Alegría Hudes	Nominated
2008	Tony Award	Best Original Score	Lin-Manuel Miranda	Won
2008	Tony Award	Best Actor in a Musical	Lin-Manuel Miranda	Nominated
2008	Tony Award	Best Featured Actor in a Musical	Robin de Jesús	Nominated
2008	Tony Award	Best Featured Actress in a Musical	Olga Merediz	Nominated
2008	Tony Award	Best Direction of a Musical	Thomas Kail	Nominated
2008	Tony Award	Best Choreography	Andy Blankenbuehler	Won
2008	Tony Award	Best Orchestrations	Alex Lacamoire and Bill Sherman	Won
2008	Tony Award	Best Scenic Design	Anna Louizos	Nominated
2008	Tony Award	Best Costume Design	Paul Tazewell	Nominated
2008	Tony Award	Best Lighting Design	Howell Binkley	Nominated
2008	Tony Award	Best Sound Design	Acme Sound Partners	Nominated
2008	Grammy Award	Best Musical Show Album		Won
2009	Pulitzer Prize for Drama			Finalist

=== Original West End production ===
Year	Award Ceremony	Category	Nominee	Result
2016	Laurence Olivier Awards	Best New Musical		Nominated
2016	Laurence Olivier Awards	Best Actor in a Supporting Role in a Musical	David Bedella	Won
2016	Laurence Olivier Awards	Best Theatre Choreographer	Drew McOnie	Won
2016	Laurence Olivier Awards	Outstanding Achievement in Music	Lin-Manuel Miranda	Won
2016	WhatsOnStage Awards	Best New Musical		Nominated
2016	WhatsOnStage Awards	Best Actor in a Musical	Sam Mackay	Nominated
2016	WhatsOnStage Awards	Best Actress in a Musical	Lily Frazer	Nominated
2016	WhatsOnStage Awards	Best Supporting Actor in a Musical	David Bedella	Won
2016	WhatsOnStage Awards	Best Supporting Actress in a Musical	Victoria Hamilton-Barritt	Nominated
2016	WhatsOnStage Awards	Best Direction	Luke Sheppard	Nominated
2016	WhatsOnStage Awards	Best Choreography	Drew McOnie	Nominated
2016	WhatsOnStage Awards	Best Set Design	Takis	Nominated
2016	WhatsOnStage Awards	Best Lighting Design	Howard Hudson	Nominated

== Reception ==
The reviews for the show were positive to mixed (the median grade of 9 major reviews was "B+"). Charles Isherwood's review in The New York Times said that "when this musical erupts in one of its expressions of collective joy, the energy it gives off could light up the George Washington Bridge for a year or two." Heather Bing of The Cleveland Plain Dealer wrote, "Although I was sometimes struggling to keep up with the hip-hop and Spanish-infused lyrics, the exciting set and choreography paired with excellent acting held my interest in the storyline." David Rooney's Variety review said, "That depth of feeling, together with the wit of Miranda's lyrics, the playful dexterity of his rhymes, his dynamic score and a bunch of truly winning performances, make the show an uncalculated charmer."

Hudes' book received mixed reviews. Charles McNulty's The Los Angeles Times review mentioned that "the downside to In the Heights is the book...which is overstuffed and oversimplified." The New York Post's Clive Barnes also gave negative comments about the book, saying that "Hudes' work is droopily sentimental and untruthful." Joe Dziemianowicz of the NY Daily News also disliked the book, but added that "what it lacks in story and believability it makes up for in a vibrant rap- and salsa-flavored score, spirited dances, and great-looking design."

== Documentary ==
On May 27, 2009, PBS' Great Performances aired an episode entitled In the Heights: Chasing Broadway Dreams. It documents the journey taken by the cast and crew to bring the show to Broadway and to later win the Tony Award for Best Musical. Producer Andrew Fried and director Paul Bozymowski captured footage of the cast and creative team for over two years, from the off-Broadway production to their Tony Award wins. The special previewed at the Paley Center for Media in New York on May 4, 2009.

== Film adaptation ==
In November 2008, Universal Pictures announced that they had acquired the rights to adapt the musical as a feature film for release in 2011. Kenny Ortega was set to direct it, and Quiara Alegría Hudes would write the screenplay. However, Universal opted not to develop the film, and the project was canceled. In January 2012, Lin-Manuel Miranda said the adaptation was back under discussion.

In May 2016, it was announced that The Weinstein Company would distribute the film. The following month, it was reported that Jon M. Chu was in talks to direct. In September 2016, Chu was confirmed as director, with production potentially beginning in spring 2017. Lin-Manuel Miranda said he would not return as Usnavi, the role he originated, but could return in another role.

In October 2017, Hudes revealed that she had asked The Weinstein Company to permit her to take the production elsewhere, in light of the Harvey Weinstein sexual abuse allegations. In April 2018, the film rights reverted to Miranda and Hudes. In May 2018, Warner Bros. Pictures acquired the film rights in a $50 million deal after a bidding war with several other studios. Warner Bros. originally set a release date of June 26, 2020. In October 2018, Anthony Ramos was cast as Usnavi. In January 2019, Corey Hawkins was cast as Benny. In April 2019, Jimmy Smits was cast as Kevin, Leslie Grace as Nina, Melissa Barrera as Vanessa, Stephanie Beatriz as Carla, Olga Merediz as Abuela Claudia (reprising her Tony nominated role from the original Broadway cast), Gregory Diaz IV as Sonny, Daphne Rubin-Vega (who did one of the radio voices in the original Broadway production) as Daniela, Lin-Manuel Miranda as Piragua Guy, and Dascha Polanco as Cuca.

Filming began on June 3, 2019, in New York. A teaser trailer was released on December 11, 2019, followed by a full trailer the next day. The film was scheduled to be released on June 26, 2020, in the United States, and on August 7, 2020, in the United Kingdom. However, it was delayed to June 10, 2021, due to the COVID-19 pandemic. The film had an opening weekend box office of $11.5 million worldwide.

== See also ==
- Dominican Americans
- Nuyorican
- Puerto Ricans in New York City
