= Andréa Burns =

American actress

- Born: Miami Beach, Florida, U.S.
- Occupations: Actress, singer, performer
- Years active: 1992–present
- Spouse: Peter Flynn
- Children: 1

Andréa Burns is an American actress and singer best known for her portrayal of the hairdresser Daniela in Lin-Manuel Miranda's musical In the Heights, as Carmen in Douglas Carter Beane's The Nance, and as Mrs. Spamboni in The Electric Company.

== Early life ==
Burns was born in Miami Beach, Florida to a Jewish father and a Venezuelan mother. She has described herself as "a Venezuelan Jewess from Miami who grew up loving Broadway."

== Career ==
Burns began her career touring the opera houses of Europe as Maria in West Side Story when she was 18 years old. She has appeared on Broadway as Belle in Disney’s Beauty and the Beast, as Vicki Nichols in The Full Monty, as Carmen in The Nance, as Daniela in In the Heights, and as Googie Gomez in The Ritz, and she has sung concerts at Carnegie Hall. Burns appeared in the original company of Jason Robert Brown’s critically acclaimed Songs for a New World. Burns portrayed Lucille Frank in the national tour of Brown's Parade, for which she received a Touring Broadway Awards nomination for Best Actress. She was also created the role of Celeste in Saturday Night, by Stephen Sondheim, at Second Stage Theatre.

Her début solo album A Deeper Shade of Red was described by Playbill as "superb on all counts!" In 2006, "100 Stories", a single she co-wrote with her brother, music producer Mike Burns, rose to the No. 2 spot on the 2006 Billboard Hot Dance Club Play charts.

Television credits include Marvel Comics's Jessica Jones, Kevin Can Wait, Sky Dancers, Law & Order: SVU, Rescue Me, Blue Bloods, The Electric Company (2009 TV series), and Wonder Pets. She can also be heard on the original cast recordings of In The Heights, Songs for a New World, This Ordinary Thursday – The Songs of Georgia Stitt, Saturday Night, It's Only Life, Dear Edwina, Shine!, Broadway Bound, and Broadway Musicals of 1953.

Burns starred as Lenora in the 2015 film Akron, an official selection of the Out on Film Festival 2015, and played Fausta in Steven Spielberg's 2021 film West Side Story.

== Stage credits ==
Year	Title	Role	Venue	Ref.
1994	Beauty and the Beast	Belle (Understudy), Ensemble	Broadway, Palace Theatre	
1995	Songs for a New World	Performer	Off-Broadway, WPA Theatre	
1999	Parade	Lucille Frank	U.S. National Tour	
1999	Sail Away	Nancy Foyle	New York Concert, Carnegie Hall	
2000	The Full Monty	Vicki Nichols	Broadway, Eugene O'Neill Theatre	
2000	Saturday Night	Celeste	Off-Broadway, Second Stage Theatre	
2001	The Full Monty	Vicki Nichols	U.S. National Tour	
2003	Sunday in the Park with George	Dot	Regional, Chicago Shakespeare Theatre	
2006	The Pirate	Manuela	Regional, Prince Music Theater	
2006	In This House	Performer	Staged Reading	
2007	The Ritz	Googie Gomez (standby)	Broadway, Studio 54	
2007	In the Heights	Daniela	Off-Broadway, The Public Theater	
2008	In the Heights	Daniela	Broadway, Richard Rodgers Theatre	
2011	Bye Bye Birdie	Rose Alvarez	Regional, The Muny	
2012	Next to Normal	Diana	Ithaca, Hangar Theatre	
2012	Ever So Humble	Performer	Ithaca, Hangar Theatre	
2013	The Nance	Carmen	Broadway, Lyceum Theatre	
2014	Smart Blonde	Judy Holliday	Regional, City Theatre	
2015	On Your Feet!	Gloria Fajardo	Regional, City Theatre	
2015	On Your Feet!	Gloria Fajardo	Broadway, Marquis Theatre	
2018	Pamela’s First Musical	Mary Ethel Bernadette	Regional, Two River Theater	
2019	The Rose Tattoo	Peppina / Serafina Delle Rose	Broadway, American Airlines Theatre	
2019	Working: A Musical	Performer	Off-Broadway, New York City Center (Encores!)	
2019	Smart Blonde	Performer	Off-Broadway, 59E59 Theaters	
2019	Carmelina	Carmelina	Off-Broadway, York Theatre Company	
2022	The Notebook	Nurse Lori / Mother	Regional, Chicago Shakespeare Theater	
2023	The Gardens of Anuncia	Aunt Lucia	Off-Broadway, Lincoln Center	
2023	The Light in the Piazza	Signora Naccarelli	Off-Broadway, New York City Center (Encores!)	
2024	The Notebook	Nurse Lori / Mother	Broadway, Gerald Schoenfeld Theatre	

== Recording credits ==
- West Side Story (2021 film) as Fausta

[Motion Picture Soundtrack, 2021]

- In The Heights

[Studio Cast, 2008] Performer

- Shade Of Red

[Solo album, 2007]

- This Ordinary Thursday

[The Songs of Georgia Stitt, 2007] Performer

- It's Only Life

[John Bucchino, 2006] Performer

- Fine and Dandy

[Studio Cast, 2004] Performer

- The Last Five Years

[Demo Recording, 2002] Performer

- 100 Stories"-

[Studio Recording, 2002] Performer

- Saturday Night as Celeste

[Original Off-Broadway Cast Album, 2000]

- Songs for a New World

[Original Off-Broadway Cast Album, 1995] Performer

== Awards and nominations ==
Year	Award	Category	Work	Result	Ref.
2001	Touring Broadway Awards	Best Actress in a Musical	Parade	Nominated	
2003	Joseph Jefferson Award	Actress in a Principal Role – Musical	Sunday in the Park with George	Nominated	
2007	Drama Desk Award	Outstanding Ensemble Performance	In the Heights	Won	
2016	Outer Critics Circle Award	Outstanding Featured Actress in a Musical	On Your Feet!	Nominated	
