= Bill Sherman =

American composer, producer, arranger

- Born: William Sherman; New York
- Education: Wesleyan University
- Era: Contemporary

Bill Sherman is an American composer, producer, arranger, and orchestrator. He is known for his work on In the Heights, Hamilton, and Sesame Street. Sherman is also a member of Team Supreme that co-hosts the Questlove Supreme podcast.

== Biography ==
Sherman was born in New York to Susan B. Sherman and Dr. Fredrick T. Sherman. Sherman graduated from Wesleyan University in Middletown, Connecticut in 2002. In 2003, he joined his roommate Lin-Manuel Miranda to form the freestyle rap group Freestyle Love Supreme, while also working with Miranda to orchestrate and arrange the music for In the Heights. His work on In the Heights won him the 2008 Tony Award for Best Orchestrations and the 2008 Grammy Award for Best Musical Show Album. He collaborated again with Miranda to produce the Hamilton album, for which he won the 2015 Grammy Award for Best Musical Theater Album.

Sherman is the musical director for several Sesame Workshop shows, including Sesame Street, for which he has written over 3000 songs. He has won three Daytime Entertainment Creative Arts Emmy Awards for "Outstanding Original Song – Children’s and Animation" for his work on Sesame street: "What I Am" in 2011, "The Power of Yet" in 2015, and "A Song About Songs" in 2018.

== Stage ==
Year	Title	Role	Venue	Ref.
2008	In the Heights	Orchestrator, arranger	Broadway, Richard Rodgers Theatre	
2019	Freestyle Love Supreme	Musical Supervisor	Broadway, Booth Theatre	
2021	Freestyle Love Supreme	Musical Supervisor	Broadway, Booth Theatre	
2022	& Juliet	Orchestrator, arranger	Broadway, Stephen Sondheim Theatre	

== Awards and nominations ==
Year	Award	Category	Work	Result	Ref.
2007	Drama Desk Awards	Outstanding Orchestrations	In the Heights	Nominated	
2008	Tony Awards	Best Orchestrations	In the Heights	Won	
2011	Daytime Emmy Awards	Outstanding Original Song – Children’s and Animation	"What I Am" from Sesame Street	Won	
2015	Daytime Emmy Awards	Outstanding Original Song – Children’s and Animation	"The Power of Yet" from Sesame Street	Won	
2015	Grammy Awards	Best Musical Theater Album	Hamilton as producer	Won	
2018	Daytime Emmy Awards	Outstanding Original Song – Children’s and Animation	"A Song About Songs" from Sesame Street	Won	
2023	Tony Awards	Best Orchestrations	& Juliet	Nominated	
2023	Outer Critics Circle Awards	Outstanding Orchestrations	& Juliet	Nominated	
