= Karen Olivo =

American musical theatre actor (born 1976)

KO
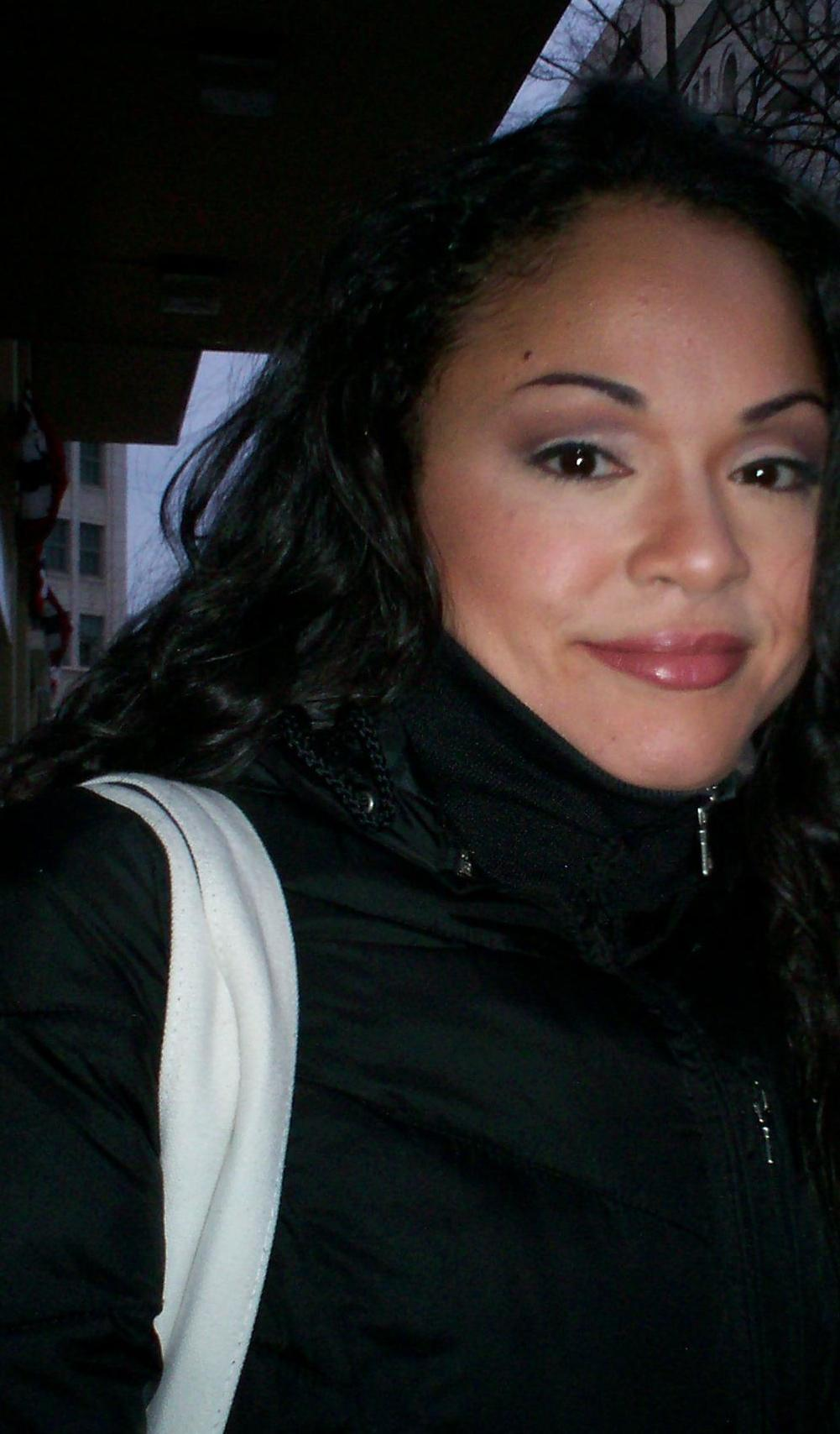
- KO in 2009
- Born: August 7, 1976 (age 50); New York City, U.S.
- Education: University of Cincinnati (BFA)
- Occupations: Actor, theatre educator, singer
- Years active: 1997–present
- Spouses: Matt Caplan (m. 2006; div. 2012) James Uphoff (m. 2014)

KO (born August 7, 1976), formerly known as Karen Olivo, is an American stage and television actor, theater educator, and singer.

In 2008, KO originated the role of Vanessa in In the Heights on Broadway. The following year, they won the 2009 Tony Award for Best Featured Actress in a Musical for their performance as Anita in a revival of West Side Story. KO is the first and only actor to win a Tony Award for a performance in West Side Story. From 2016 to 2017, KO portrayed the role of Angelica Schuyler in the Chicago production of Hamilton. In 2019, KO originated the leading role of Satine in the Broadway adaptation of Moulin Rouge! and was nominated for a Tony Award for Best Actress in a Musical. Since 2022, when they stepped back from acting, KO is an associate professor, and head of music theatre, at Northwestern University.

== Early life ==
KO was born on August 7, 1976, in the South Bronx, New York City. KO's father is of Puerto Rican and Native American descent, and their mother is of Dominican and Chinese descent. They were raised in Bartow, Florida and attended the Lois Cowles Harrison Center for the Visual and Performing Arts in nearby Lakeland, Florida, and later the University of Cincinnati – College-Conservatory of Music. They left school before their final year to join the original Broadway production of Rent.

== Career ==
=== 1997–2006: Early career and Broadway debut ===
KO began their professional career in 1997 when they joined the original Broadway production of Rent. They joined as a replacement swing, also understudying the roles of Mimi and Maureen. The following year they joined the first national tour of Rent, dubbed the "Angel Tour", as a replacement swing once again. In late 1998, KO began playing Mimi on the tour, and they continued in the role until leaving the show in January 1999. They moved back to New York City in 1999 but did not receive any roles outside of a small part in As the World Turns before joining the regional try-out of the musical Brooklyn in 2003. Before Brooklyn transferred to Broadway the following Fall, KO took part of a regional staging of Children of Eden and filmed guest roles for All My Children and Law & Order. The musical Brooklyn open on Broadway in October 2004 and closed in June 2005. Following its closure, KO joined the cast of the Brazilian-themed off-Broadway musical Miracle Brothers, which closed in October 2005. The following year they had small roles in NBC's Conviction and the independent film Adrift in Manhattan, which premiered at the Sundance Film Festival in 2007.

=== 2007–2012: Prominence on Broadway ===
==== In the Heights ====
In 2008, In the Heights opened on Broadway. KO starred as Vanessa, opposite Lin-Manuel Miranda.

==== West Side Story ====
In 2009, KO won a Tony Award for their performance as Anita in the Broadway revival of West Side Story. They were also nominated for both a Drama Desk and an Outer Critic's Circle Award for their critically acclaimed performance as Anita. They earned their second Astaire Award nomination for Best Female Dancer for their performance in West Side Story, after previously winning the same award in 2008 for their performance in In the Heights. They were contracted with West Side Story at the Palace through 2010. During the May 8, 2010, matinee performance of West Side Story, KO broke their foot. Anita standby Natalie Cortez performed the role until the show's closure.

KO then took part in the world premiere of By the Way, Meet Vera Stark at off-Broadway's Second Stage Theater. Written by Pulitzer Prize-winning playwright Lynn Nottage, the play "draws upon the screwball films of the 1930s to take a funny and irreverent look at racial stereotypes in Hollywood."

==== Film and television ====
KO had a recurring role in The Good Wife on CBS. They played wealthy law student Giada Cabrini, a potential love interest of firm partner Will Gardner (Josh Charles). KO was a series regular in the second season of NBC's Harry's Law, playing "hot shot lawyer" Cassie Reynolds hired by Kathy Bates' character.

KO also appeared as Isabelle Perez, a woman who was unknowingly sterilized in the Law & Order episode "Birthright". They also appear in the spin-off series Law & Order: Special Victims Unit as Jennifer Benitez in an episode titled "Loophole". They later appeared in Law & Order: Special Victims Unit as Yelina Muñoz in an episode titled "October Surprise".

KO has had several roles in movies, including Make Yourself at Home, The New Twenty, Shanghai Hotel, and The Orphan Killer.

=== 2013–2021: Break from acting and return to theater ===
On March 18, 2013, KO announced on their website that they were taking a break from acting, saying "with this knowledge I start a new chapter. I leave behind the actor and I start learning how to be me." During this period, they moved to Madison, Wisconsin, where they taught classes for the UW–Madison theater department and became involved in the local theater scene, which included opening a private studio to coach young performers.

They returned to professional acting the following year with New York City Center's Encores! production of the Jonathan Larson musical tick, tick... BOOM! alongside fellow Hamilton alumni Lin-Manuel Miranda and Leslie Odom Jr. in June 2014 off-Broadway.

On July 13, 2016, it was announced that KO would star as Angelica Schuyler in the Chicago production of Hamilton. They were part of the cast from October 19, 2016, until August 6, 2017. They stated they intended to pursue teaching after leaving the production, stating that "I'm leaving the spotlight to make sure others find theirs". In February 2018, KO played Florence Vassy in the Kennedy Center's revival of the musical Chess.

On July 25, 2019, KO starred in the premiere of the Broadway production of the jukebox musical Moulin Rouge! in New York City. They continued to perform their role in the show at the Al Hirschfeld Theatre for an open-ended run. On October 15, 2020, KO was nominated for a Tony Award for Best Leading Actress in a Musical. On April 14, 2021, KO announced they would not return to the show once it reopens as a protest of the industry's silence on the allegations against producer Scott Rudin. In an Instagram video, KO stated, "Social justice is more important than being the sparkling diamond."

On July 18, 2021, KO appeared on a podcast titled Noah's Corner, previously Rye's Little Corner, on episode 19, titled "Dreams Come True Bitches". On the episode, KO was interviewed by co-hosts Noah Grace and Nellie. They spoke about their time in In the Heights and Moulin Rouge! as well as their album, Leave. In December 2021, KO joined We Won't Sleep, a bio-musical based on the life of Jeannette Rankin. Industry readings of the production took place on December 17 and 18, 2021 in New York City. The world premiere was set to open in May 2022 at Signature Theatre in Arlington, Virginia, but was cancelled due to the COVID-19 pandemic.

=== 2022–present: Educator at Northwestern University ===
In 2020, KO started teaching theatre, and in 2022 relocated to Evanston, Illinois when they became an associate professor and the Donald G. Robertson Director of Music Theatre in the School of Communication at Northwestern University.

== Personal life ==
KO is married to Jim Uphoff, with whom they have two step-children. KO and Uphoff, a marketing manager and former New York theater sound technician, married in September 2014. Until 2012, KO was married to Broadway actor Matt Caplan.

In 2013, while taking a break from acting, KO moved to Madison, Wisconsin, where they and Uphoff share a home they call their "home base". Both KO and their husband have family in Madison. KO has previously lived in Hell's Kitchen, Manhattan, Brooklyn, and Los Angeles.

In 2021, KO announced via Instagram that they are non-binary and use they/them pronouns.

== Theatre credits ==
Year(s)	Production	Role	Location	Category
1997–99	Rent	Swing	Nederlander Theatre: August 1997 – March 1998	Broadway replacement
1997–99	Rent	Swing	US national tour: April – November 1998	First national tour replacement
1997–99	Rent	Mimi	US national tour: November 1998 – January 1999	First national tour replacement
2003–05	Brooklyn	Faith	The New Denver Civic Center: May – June 2003	Original Denver production (pre-Broadway tryout)
2003–05	Brooklyn	Faith	Plymouth Theatre: September 2004 – June 2005	Original Broadway production
2004	Children of Eden	Yonah	Ford's Theatre: March – June 2004	Washington, D.C. revival
2005	Miracle Brothers	Jeca	Vineyard Theatre: August – October 2005	Original Off-Broadway production
2007–08	In the Heights	Vanessa	37 Arts Theatre: January – July 2007	Original Off-Broadway production
2007–08	In the Heights	Vanessa	Richard Rodgers Theatre: February – November 2008	Original Broadway production
2007	Hair	Sheila	Delacorte Theater	40th Anniversary Concert
2009–10	West Side Story	Anita	Palace Theatre: February 2009 – May 2010	Broadway revival
2011	By the Way, Meet Vera Stark	Anna Mae/Afua Assata Ejobo	Second Stage Theatre: April – June 2011	Original Off-Broadway production
2012	Murder Ballad	Sara	City Center - Stage II: October – December 2012	Original Off-Broadway production
2013	In the Heights	Vanessa	United Palace	Reunion concert
2014	tick, tick... BOOM!	Susan/Karessa	New York City Center: June 2014	Off-Broadway/Concert Staging
2015	Public Works: The Odyssey	Penelope	Delacorte Theater: September 2015	Concert Staging
2016	West Side Story	Anita	Hollywood Bowl: July 2016	Concert Staging
2016–17	Hamilton	Angelica Schuyler	PrivateBank Theatre: September 2016 – August 2017	Regional Chicago production
2018	Chess	Florence	JFK Center for the Performing Arts: February 2018	Concert Staging
2018	Moulin Rouge!	Satine	Emerson Colonial Theatre: June – August 2018	Original Boston production (Pre-Broadway tryout)
2018	Fun Home	Alison Bechdel	Forward Theater: November 2018	Regional Madison production
2019–20	Moulin Rouge!	Satine	Al Hirschfeld Theatre: July 2019 – March 2020	Original Broadway production
2023	Siluetas	Dinora	Power Street Theatre: November 2023	Concert
2024	Siluetas	Dinora	Power Street Theatre: May - June 2024	Regional

== Awards and nominations ==
Year	Award	Category	Work	Result	Ref
2007	Drama Desk Award	Outstanding Ensemble Performance	In the Heights	Won	
2008	Fred and Adele Astaire Award	Best Female Dancer	In the Heights	Won	
2009	Tony Award	Best Featured Actress in a Musical	West Side Story	Won	
2009	Drama Desk Award	Outstanding Featured Actress in a Musical	West Side Story	Nominated	
2009	Drama League Award	Distinguished Performance	West Side Story	Nominated	
2009	Outer Critics Circle Award	Outstanding Featured Actress in a Musical	West Side Story	Nominated	
2009	Fred and Adele Astaire Award	Best Female Dancer	West Side Story	Nominated	
2019	IRNE Awards	Best Actress in a Musical	Moulin Rouge!	Nominated	
2020	Tony Award	Best Actress in a Musical	Moulin Rouge!	Nominated	
2020	Drama League Award	Distinguished Performance	Moulin Rouge!	Nominated	
2020	Outer Critics Circle Award	Outstanding Actress in a Musical	Moulin Rouge!	Honoree	
2020	Grammy Award	Best Musical Theater Album	Moulin Rouge!	Nominated	
