= List of Rapunzel's Tangled Adventure episodes =

Rapunzel's Tangled Adventure (also known as Tangled: The Series in its first season) is an American animated television series developed by Chris Sonnenburg and Shane Prigmore and produced by Disney Television Animation that premiered on Disney Channel as a Disney Channel Original Movie titled Tangled: Before Ever After on March 10, 2017, with regular episodes premiering on March 24, 2017. The series is based on the 2010 film Tangled and features the returning voices of Mandy Moore and Zachary Levi, alongside Eden Espinosa, Clancy Brown, Julie Bowen, James Monroe Iglehart, Jeff Ross, Paul F. Tompkins, and Jeremy Jordan.

In May 2018, ahead of the premiere of the series' second season, it was announced that the series has been renewed for a third and final season, which premiered on October 7, 2019.

During the course of the series, 60 episodes of Rapunzel's Tangled Adventure aired over three seasons.

== Series overview ==
Season	Episodes	Originally released	
Season	Episodes	First released	Last released
Film		March 10, 2017	
1	21	March 24, 2017	January 13, 2018
2	21	June 24, 2018	April 14, 2019
3	17	October 7, 2019	March 1, 2020

== Episodes ==
=== Film (2017) ===
No.	Title	Directed by	Written by	Storyboard by	Original release date	U.S. viewers (millions)
1	Tangled: Before Ever After	Tom Caulfield and Stephen Sandoval	Jase Ricci	David Au, Sean Bishop, Heidi Jo Gilbert, Joe Oh, Kaitlyn Ritter and Wendy Sullivan	March 10, 2017	2.87
Six months after the events of Tangled, Rapunzel is settling into life as princess of Corona, but is unable to enjoy it with the constant protection of her father's guards. When she and her lady-in-waiting, Cassandra, sneak out of the castle, they come upon some black rock spikes that magically bring back her long blonde hair. Though Eugene, Pascal and Maximus also find out about the hair, Rapunzel decides not to tell them about how she got it back. Rapunzel manages to hide her hair from her parents but becomes nervous because of her coronation day. A female rogue, Lady Caine, appears at Rapunzel's coronation with supporters and a hatred of King Frederic. With no other choice, Rapunzel reveals her new hair and defeats the thugs together with her friends. Later, Rapunzel admits to her father that she had snuck out of the castle, so he forbids Rapunzel from leaving the walls of Corona. Rapunzel feels trapped, but with her mother's encouragement, she decides to take her relationships and role in Corona one day at a time. A little while later, a mysterious individual comes across the site of the magical flower that cured Rapunzel's mother. In its place are more mysterious black rock spikes.

=== Season 1: Tangled: the series (2017–18) ===
No. overall	No. in season	Title	Directed by	Written by	Storyboard by	Original release date	Prod. code	U.S. viewers (millions)
2	1	"What the Hair!?"	Tom Caulfield	Dave Schiff	David Au and Kaitlyn Ritter	March 24, 2017	101	1.30
3	2	"Rapunzel's Enemy"	Stephen Sandoval	Story by : Dave Schiff and ND Stevenson; Written by : Katie Mattila	Ken Boyer and Mark John Howard	March 31, 2017	102	1.05
4	3	"Fitzherbert P.I."	Joe Oh	Story by : Ricky Roxburgh and Suzanne Weber; Written by : Jase Ricci	Heidi Jo Gilbert and Wendy Sullivan	April 7, 2017	103	1.02
5	4	"Challenge of the Brave"	Tom Caulfield	Ricky Roxburgh	Bosook Coburn and Dana Terrace	April 14, 2017	104	0.96
6	5	"Cassandra v. Eugene"	Joe Oh	Katie Mattila	Ken Boyer and Mark John Howard	April 21, 2017	105	0.97
7	6	"The Return of Strongbow"	Tom Caulfield	Dave Schiff	Wendy Sullivan and Shane Zalvin	April 28, 2017	106	1.01
8	7	"In Like Flynn"	Stephen Sandoval	Han-Yee Ling	Hillary Bradfield and Bosook Coburn	July 23, 2017	107	0.94
9	8	"Great Expotations"	Joe Oh	Ricky Roxburgh	David Au, Kaitlyn Ritter and James Suhr	July 30, 2017	108	0.99
10	9	"Under Raps"	Tom Caulfield	Kelly Hannon	Ken Boyer and Jean-Sebastien Dulcos	August 6, 2017	109	0.87
11	10	"One Angry Princess"	Stephen Sandoval	Story by : Katie Mattila and Jase Ricci; Written by : Jase Ricci	Wendy Sullivan and Shane Zalvin	August 13, 2017	110	1.13
12	11	"Pascal's Story"	Tom Caulfield	Ricky Roxburgh	Wendy Sullivan and Shane Zalvin	August 20, 2017	114	0.93
13	12	"Big Brothers of Corona"	Joe Oh	Han-Yee Ling	Hillary Bradfield and Bosook Coburn	October 1, 2017	115	1.06
14	13	"The Wrath of Ruthless Ruth"	Tom Caulfield	Kelly Hannon	David Au and Jean-Sebastien Dulcos	October 8, 2017	117	0.83
15	14	"Max's Enemy"	Joe Oh	Story by : Katie Mattila; Written by : Dave Schiff	Wendy Sullivan and Shane Zalvin	October 15, 2017	118	0.85
16	15	"The Way of the Willow"	Stephen Sandoval	Katie Mattila	Bosook Coburn and Cat Harman-Mitchell	October 22, 2017	119	0.94
17	16	"Queen for a Day"	Joe Oh	Jase Ricci	Hillary Bradfield, Tom Caulfield, Bosook Coburn, Kaitlyn Ritter and James Suhr	November 19, 2017	111–112	1.22
18	17	"Painter's Block"	Stephen Sandoval	Dave Schiff	David Au, Benjamin Balistreri, Jean-Sebastien Dulcos and Stephen Sandoval	November 25, 2017	113	0.99
19	18	"Not in the Mood"	Stephen Sandoval	Kelly Hannon	Kaitlyn Ritter and James Suhr	December 2, 2017	116	0.95
20	19	"The Quest for Varian"	Tom Caulfield	Ricky Roxburgh	Bosook Coburn, Cat Harman-Mitchell, Kaitlyn Ritter and James Suhr	December 9, 2017	120	1.06
21	20	"The Alchemist Returns"	Joe Oh	Dave Schiff	David Au, Tom Caulfield, Jean-Sebastien Dulcos, Wendy Sullivan and Shane Zalvin	December 16, 2017	121	0.96
22	21	"Secret of the Sun Drop"	Stephen Sandoval	Story by : Jase Ricci; Written by : Kelly Hannon, Jase Ricci, Ricky Roxburgh, Dave Schiff, and Jeremy Shipp	Tom Caulfield, Bosook Coburn, Cat Harman-Mitchell, Wendy Sullivan and Shane Zalvin	January 13, 2018	122–123	0.96

=== Season 2: Rapunzel's Tangled Adventure (2018–19) ===
No. overall	No. in season	Title	Directed by	Written by	Storyboard by	Original release date	Prod. code	U.S. viewers (millions)
23	1	"Beyond the Corona Walls"	Joe Oh	Jase Ricci	Juston Gordon-Montgomery, David Pimentel, Kaitlyn Ritter, Wendy Sullivan and Shane Zalvin	June 24, 2018	201–202	0.67
24	2	"The Return of Quaid"	Tom Caulfield	Jeremy Shipp	Gaelle Beerens, Casey Coffey and Anna Lencioni	July 1, 2018	203	0.61
25	3	"Goodbye and Goodwill"	Stephen Sandoval	Story by : Ricky Roxburgh; Written by : Dave Schiff	Bosook Coburn and Cat Harman-Mitchell	July 8, 2018	204	0.59
26	4	"Forest of No Return"	Joe Oh	Kelly Hannon	Juston Gordon-Montgomery and Kaitlyn Ritter	July 15, 2018	205	0.53
27	5	"Freebird"	Tom Caulfield	Dave Schiff	Wendy Sullivan and Shane Zalvin	July 22, 2018	206	0.57
28	6	"Vigor the Visionary"	Stephan Sandoval	Ricky Roxburgh	Anna Lencioni and Stephen Sandoval	July 29, 2018	207	0.52
29	7	"Keeper of the Spire"	Bosook Coburn	Jase Ricci and Jeremy Shipp	Bosook Coburn and Cat Harman-Mitchell	August 5, 2018	208	0.64
30	8	"King Pascal"	Tom Caulfield	Kelly Hannon	Gaelle Beerens, Juston Gordon-Montgomery and Kaitlyn Ritter	August 12, 2018	209	0.60
31	9	"There's Something About Hook Foot"	Stephan Sandoval	Jeremy Shipp	Wendy Sullivan and Shane Zalvin	August 19, 2018	210	0.60
32	10	"Happiness Is…"	Joe Oh	Ricky Roxburgh	Morin Halperin, Todd Kurosawa and Anna Lencioni	August 26, 2018	211	0.50
33	11	"Max and Eugene in Peril on the High Seas"	Tom Caulfield	Dave Schiff	Bosook Coburn and Cat Harman-Mitchell	March 3, 2019	212	0.37
34	12	"Curses!"	Stephen Sandoval	Kelly Hannon	Juston Gordon-Montgomery and Kaitlyn Ritter	March 10, 2019	213	0.36
35	13	"The Eye of Pincosta"	Joe Oh	Jeremy Shipp	Wendy Sullivan and Shane Zalvin	March 10, 2019	214	0.38
36	14	"Rapunzel and the Great Tree"	Tom Caulfield and Stephen Sandoval	Jase Ricci	Bosook Coburn, Cat Harman-Mitchell, Todd Kurosawa and Anna Lencioni	March 17, 2019	215–216	0.37
37	15	"The Brothers Hook"	Tom Caulfield	Ricky Roxburgh	Wendy Sullivan and Shane Zalvin	March 24, 2019	218	0.28
38	16	"Rapunzel: Day One"	Stephen Sandoval	Leanna Dindal	Todd Kurosawa and Anna Lencioni	March 24, 2019	217	0.30
39	17	"Mirror, Mirror"	Joe Oh	Dave Schiff	Juston Gordon-Montgomery and Kaitlyn Ritter	March 31, 2019	219	0.31
40	18	"You're Kidding Me!"	Joe Oh	Kelly Hannon	Bosook Coburn, Cat Harman-Mitchell, Diana Kidlaeid and Todd Kurosawa	March 31, 2019	220	0.33
41	19	"Rapunzeltopia"	Tom Caulfield	Ricky Roxburgh	Giovanny F. Cardenas, Juston Gordon-Montgomery, Kaitlyn Ritter and Yonatan Tal	April 7, 2019	221	0.35
42	20	"Lost and Found"	Shane Zalvin	Jeremy Shipp	Diana Kidlaeid and Wendy Sullivan	April 7, 2019	222	0.35
43	21	"Destinies Collide"	Tom Caulfield & Joe Oh	Jase Ricci, Leanna Dindal, Kelly Hannon, Ricky Roxburgh, Dave Schiff, & Jeremy Shipp	Bosook Coburn, Cat Harman-Mitchell, Diana Kidlaeid, Todd Kurosawa, Anna Lencioni, Kaitlyn Ritter and Wendy Sullivan	April 14, 2019	223–224	0.35

=== Season 3: Rapunzel's Tangled Adventure (2019–20) ===
No. overall	No. in season	Title	Directed by	Written by	Storyboard by	Original release date	Prod. code	U.S. viewers (millions)
44	1	"Rapunzel's Return"	Tom Caulfield & Shane Zalvin	Ricky Roxburgh	Isabelle Gedigk, Diana Kidlaeid, Todd Kurosawa, Anna Lencioni, Kaitlyn Ritter, Wendy Sullivan and Kataneh Vahdani	October 7, 2019	301-302	0.29
45	2	"Return of the King"	Philip Pignotti	Jeremy Shipp	Adrian Barrios, Eric Elrod, James Fuji, Diana Kidlaeid and Jenessa Warren	October 8, 2019	303	0.34
46	3	"Who's Afraid of the Big, Bad Wolf?"	Shane Zalvin	Story by : Kelly Hannon and Jase Ricci; Written by : Jase Ricci	Jerry Yu Ching and Antony Mazzotta	October 9, 2019	304	0.24
47	4	"The Lost Treasure of Herz Der Sonne"	Tom Caulfield	Dave Schiff	Sam Hood, Kaitlyn Ritter and Wendy Sullivan	October 10, 2019	305	0.30
48	5	"No Time Like the Past"	Philip Pignotti	Kelly Hannon	Todd Kurosawa and Anna Lencioni	October 11, 2019	306	0.31
49	6	"Beginnings"	Shane Zalvin	Leanna Dindal	Sam Hood, Diana Kidlaeid and Jenessa Warren	October 15, 2019	307	0.16
50	7	"The King and Queen of Hearts"	Tom Caulfield	Ricky Roxburgh	Jerry Yu Ching and Antony Mazzotta	October 16, 2019	308	0.23
51	8	"Day of the Animals"	Tom Caulfield	Kelly Hannon	Adrian Barrios, David Prince and Jenessa Warren	October 17, 2019	309	0.23
52	9	"Be Very Afraid!"	Philip Pignotti	Jeremy Shipp	Kaitlyn Ritter and Wendy Sullivan	October 18, 2019	311	0.33
53	10	"Pascal's Dragon"	Shane Zalvin	Dave Schiff	Todd Kurosawa, Anna Lencioni and Dave Prince	January 12, 2020	310	0.27
54	11	"Islands Apart"	Philip Pignotti	Leanna Dindal	Jerry Yu Ching, Ben Choi and Antony Mazzotta	January 19, 2020	312	0.30
55	12	"Cassandra's Revenge"	Tom Caulfield & Shane Zalvin	Ricky Roxburgh	Anna Lencioni, Kaitlyn Ritter, Wendy Sullivan and Kuni Tomita	January 26, 2020	313–314	0.35
56	13	"Race to the Spire"	Philip Pignotti	Jeremy Shipp	Adrian Barrios, Isabelle Gedigk and Jenessa Warren	February 2, 2020	315	0.33
57	14	"A Tale of Two Sisters"	Shane Zalvin	Dave Schiff & Jeremy Shipp	Jerry Yu Ching and Antony Mazzotta	February 9, 2020	316	0.41
58	15	"Flynnpostor"	Tom Caulfield	Ricky Roxburgh	Kaitlyn Ritter and Wendy Sullivan	February 16, 2020	317	0.40
59	16	"Once a Handmaiden…"	Philip Pignotti	Leanna Dindal	Adrian Barrios, Anna Lencioni and Kuni Tomita	February 23, 2020	318	0.37
60	17	"Plus Est En Vous"	Benjamin Balistreri, Phillip Pignotti, & Shane Zalvin	Jase Ricci	Anna Lencioni, Antony Mazzotta, Kaitlyn Ritter, Wendy Sullivan and Jenessa Warren	March 1, 2020	319-321	0.47

== Shorts ==
=== Tangled: Short Cuts ===
A series of shorts were released that focused on Rapunzel and her friends' activities in Corona. While the second half of the shorts aired during season 2, they chronologically take place during the first season as the setting is still in Corona.

No.	Title	Release date
1	"Checkmate"	May 5, 2017
Pascal wants to play chess with Maximus, but he is on guard duty.
2	"Prison Bake"	May 12, 2017
Attila explains how he came up with his signature baked goods.
3	"Make Me Smile"	May 19, 2017
Rapunzel will not rest until Old Lady Crowley smiles for her.
4	"Hare Peace"	May 26, 2017
Feldspar asks Rapunzel to look after his cabbages, but ends up protecting a rabbit.
5	"Night Bite"	June 25, 2018
While Rapunzel, Eugene and Pascal sleep under the stars, Maximus tries to protect them from a mosquito.
6	"Hiccup Fever"	July 7, 2018
All of Corona tries to cure Rapunzel's hiccups.
7	"Snowball"	August 4, 2018
Rapunzel and Pascal get involved in some snowball trouble.
8	"Hairdon't"	August 20, 2018
Rapunzel gives Eugene a haircut that gets everyone's attention.
9	"Unicorny"	August 23, 2018
In the style of a detective noir, Rapunzel attempts to look for Vladimir's missing ceramic unicorn.

=== Disney Theme Song Takeover ===
As part of a promotional campaign, Disney Channel began airing the Disney Theme Song Takeover wherein supporting characters from different shows performed the theme song to the series they were in.

No.	Title	Release date
1	"Shorty Theme Song Takeover"	March 20, 2020
While Rapunzel goes searching for her missing diary, Shorty unknowingly uses it to do his take on the theme called "Wind in My Beard".

=== Chibi Tiny Tales (2021) ===
Disney began releasing new shorts titled Chibi Tiny Tales as a loose follow-up to Big Chibi 6 The Shorts. The shorts started airing almost a year after the series ended.

No.	Title	Original release date
1	"Goatee Don't"	April 18, 2021
Flynn's goatee is on the run and it's up to Rapunzel and Pascal to catch it!
2	"Lunar Lunacy"	April 25, 2021
It's lunar lunacy! When the moon covers the sun, Rapunzel turns into a mischievous prankster!
3	"Hairpocalypse"	May 2, 2021
Everyone in town grows Rapunzel's long mane of golden hair after smelling the magic flower!
