= List of programs broadcast by Disney Channel (Latin America) =

The List of programs broadcast by Disney Channel (Latin America) lists various series and shows that are broadcast, have been broadcast or are about to be broadcast by Disney Channel in Latin America. The entire TV program is broadcast in Spanish. For this purpose, foreign-language series and shows receive a Spanish dubbing.

== Programming ==
=== Current programming ===
==== Series (from Disney Latin America) ====
Title	Spanish title
Art Attack: Challenge Mode	Art Attack: Modo Desafío
Once	O11CE
Soy Luna	Soy Luna

==== Series (from Disney Brazil) ====
Title	Spanish title
Diário de Pilar	Las aventuras de Pilar

==== Series (from Disney US) ====
Title	Spanish title
Amphibia	Amphibia
Austin & Ally	Austin & Ally
Big City Greens	Los vecinos Green
Bunk'd	Acampados
Big Hero 6: The Series	Grandes Héroes: La serie
Chibiverse	Chibiverso
Coven Academy	Coven Academy: El secreto de las Brujas
Dave, the Barbarian	Dave, el bárbaro
Dragon Striker	Dragon Striker
DuckTales	Patoaventuras
Electric Bloom	Electric Bloom: La mejor banda del mundo
Fish Hooks	Pecezuelos
Future-Worm!	Gusano del Futuro
Gravity Falls	Gravity Falls: Un verano de misterios
Good Luck Charlie	¡Buena suerte, Charlie!
Girl Meets World	El Mundo de Riley
Hannah Montana	Hannah Montana
Hamster & Gretel	Hamster & Gretel
Hercules: The Animated Series	Hércules: La serie animada
The Ghost and Molly McGee	El fantasma y Molly McGee
American Dragon: Jake Long	Jake Long: El Dragón Occidental
Jessie	Jessie
Jonas	Jonas
Kiff	Kiff
Kick Buttowski: Surburban Daredevil	Kick Buttowski: Medio doble de riesgo
Liv and Maddie	Liv and Maddie
Mickey Mouse	Mickey Mouse
Phineas and Ferb	Phineas y Ferb
Pickle and Peanut	Pickle y Maní
Moon Girl and Devil Dinosaur	Moon Girl y Devil, el dinosaurio
Motorcity	Motorcity
Milo Murphy's Law	La Ley de Milo Murphy
The Emperor's New School	Las nuevas locuras del Emperador
The Owl House	La casa Búho
Randy Cunningham: 9th Grade Ninja	Randy Cunningham: Ninja Total
Secrets of Sulphur Springs	Secretos en Sulphur Springs
Star vs. the Forces of Evil	Star vs. las fuerzas del mal
StuGo	StuGo: Campamento de verano
Tangled: The Series	Enredados otra vez: la serie
Vampirina: Teenage Vampire	Vampirina: Una vampirina adolescente
Wander Over Yonder	Galaxia Wander
Wizards of Waverly Place	Los hechiceros de Waverly Place
Wizards Beyond Waverly Place	Los hechiceros más allá de Waverly Place
Zombies: The Re-Animated Series	Zombies: La serie re-animada

==== Acquired series ====
Title	Spanish title
Miraculous Ladybug	Miraculous: Las aventuras de Ladybug
Tara Duncan	Tara Duncan

=== Former programming ===
==== Series (from Disney Latin America) ====
Title	Spanish title
Art Attack	Art Attack
Bia	Bia
Champeta: El ritmo de la Tierra	Champeta: El ritmo de la Tierra
As the Bell Rings	Cuando toca la campana
Jake & Blake	Jake & Blake
High School Musical: The Selection	High School Musical: la selección
Highway: Rolling Adventure	Highway: Rodando la Aventura
Interwined	Entrelazados
Los MacAnimals	Los MacAnimals
Lucha: Despierta tu Naturaleza	Lucha: Despierta tu Naturaleza
Journey to the Center of the Earth	Viaje al Centro de la Tierra
Pijama Party	Pijama Party
Selenkay	Selenkay
STM	Se tú misma
Slime Chef	Slime Chef
The U-Mix Show	The U-Mix Show
Violetta	Violetta
20.000 Leagues Under the Sea	20.000 Leguas de Viaje Submarino
Zapping Zone	Zapping Zone

==== Series (from Disney Brazil) ====
Title	Spanish title
Juacas	Juacas
Que Talento!	¡Qué talento!

==== Series (from Disney EMEA) ====
Title	Spanish title
Alex & Co.	Alex & Co.
Evermoor	Evermoor
The Evermoor Chronicles	Las crónicas de Evermoor
The Lodge	The Lodge: Música y secretos
Mère et Fille	Madre e hija
Summer Break Stories	Diario de amigas

==== Series (from Disney US) ====
Title	Spanish title
101 Dalmatian Street	Calle Dálmatas 101
101 Dalmatians: The Series	Los 101 dálmatas: La serie
Aladdin	Aladdin
Andi Mack	Andi Mack
A.N.T. Farm	Programa de Talentos
As the Bell Rings	Mientras toca la campana
Best Friends Whenever	Amigas cuando sea
Bizaardvark	Bizaardvark
Boy Meets World	Aprendiendo a vivir
Brandy & Mr. Whiskers	Las aventuras de Brandy y el Sr. Bigotes
Brotherly Love	Amor fraternal
Bug Juice: My Adventures at Camp	Bug Juice: Aventuras de Campamento
Buzz Lightyear of Star Command	Buzz Lightyear del Comando Estelar
The Buzz on Maggie	Maggie, una mosca con onda
Code: 9	Código 9: Cámara oculta
Coop & Cami Ask the World	Coop y Cami
Cory in the House	Cory en la casa blanca
Disney's Magic Bake-Off	Disney Magic Bake-Off
Disney's Doug	Doug de Disney
Dog with a Blog	Stan, el perro bloguero
DuckTales	Patoaventuras
Even Stevens	Mano a mano
Fast Layne	Fast Layne
Gabby Duran & the Unsittables	Gabby Duran: Niñera de Aliens
Gargoyles	Gárgolas
Goof Troop	La tropa Goofy
Hailey's On It	¡Hailey está en ello!
Honey, I Shrunk the Kids: The TV Show	Querida, encogí a los niños
High School Musical: The Musical: The Series	High School Musical: El musical: la serie
Home Improvement	Mejorando la casa
House of Mouse	El show del ratón
I Didn't Do It	Yo no lo hice
Just Roll with It	Sigue la corriente
Kim Possible	Kim Possible
K.C. Undercover	Agente K.C.
The Legend of Tarzan	La leyenda de Tarzán
Lilo & Stitch: The Series	Lilo & Stitch: La serie
Lizzie McGuire	Lizzie McGuire
Lloyd in Space	Lloyd del Espacio
Mickey Mouse Works	Mickeymanía
The Mysterious Benedict Society	La misteriosa sociedad Benedict
Pepper Ann	Pepper Ann
Phil of the Future	Phil del futuro
PrankStars	PrankStars
Pretty Freekin Scary	Pretty Freekin Scary
Quack Pack	Quack Pack
Raven's Home	La casa de Raven
Recess	Recreo
The Replacements	Los sustitutos
Saturdays	Saturdays: Sobre ruedas
Shake It Up	A Todo Ritmo
Smart Guy	Chico listo
Sonny with a Chance	Sunny entre estrellas
So Random!	¡Que onda!
So Weird	Qué raro
Stuck in the Middle	Atrapada en el medio
Sydney to the Max	Sydney como Max
Teacher's Pet	La mascota de la clase
Teen Angel	Ángel adolescente
That's so Raven	Es tan Raven
The Little Mermaid	La sirenita
The Proud Family	La Familia Proud
Timon & Pumbaa	Las aventuras de Timón y Pumba
The 7D	Los 7E
The Suite Life of Zack & Cody	Zack y Cody: Gemelos en acción
The Suite Life on Deck	Zack y Cody: Gemelos a bordo
Ultra Violet & Black Scorpion	Ultra Violeta y el Escorpión Negro
Win, Lose or Draw	Ganes o pierdas, ¡dibuja!
The Weekenders	La pandilla del fin de semana

==== Acquired series ====
Title	Spanish title
A Kind of Magic	Mi familia mágica
Bill Nye the Science Guy	Bill, el científico
Backstage	Backstage
Caitlin's Way	Toda Caitlin
Camp Lakebottom	Campamento Lakebottom
Casi ángeles	Casi ángeles
Chiquititas	Chiquititas
Crash Zone	Crash Zone
Dino Dana	Dino Dana
The Fairly OddParents	Los padrinos mágicos
Find Me in Paris	Encuéntrame en París
Fat Dog Mendoza	El Gordo Mendoza
Floricienta	Floricienta
Gadget Boy	El Inspector Truquitos
Glitter Model	Glitter Model
Go Away, Unicorn!	¡Vete ya, Unicornio!
Holly Hobbie	Holly Hobbie
Hotel Transylvania: The Series	Hotel Transylvania: La serie
Kampung Boy	Kampung Boy
Life with Derek	Mi vida con Derek
Mortified	¿Por qué a mi?
Naturally, Sadie	Adolescente por naturaleza
The Next Step	The Next Step: Academia de danza
The Wayne Manifesto	El Manifiesto de Wayne
Paradise Café	Paradise Café
Patito Feo	Patito Feo
Rolling with the Ronks!	Flash y los Ronks
Trollhunters: Tales of Arcadia	Trollhunters: Relatos de Arcadia
Tromba Trem	Trompa Tren
Zip Zip	Zip Zip
