= Amber Iman =

American actress and singer

- Born: March 16, 1986 (age 40); Atlanta, Georgia, United States
- Education: Howard University (BFA)
- Occupations: Actress, singer

Amber Iman is an American actress and singer. She made her Broadway debut in 2013 as Nina Simone in Soul Doctor and appeared in the Broadway musical Shuffle Along in 2016 and in the first national tour of Hamilton. In 2024 she originated the role of Rafaela in the Broadway musical Lempicka, for which she was nominated for the Tony Award for Best Featured Actress in a Musical. She is a co-founder of the Broadway Advocacy Coalition and of Black Women on Broadway.

== Early life ==
Iman was born in Atlanta, Georgia, the daughter of the actress Margo Moorer. She graduated from Howard University with a BFA in musical theatre and began her career in regional theatre in Atlanta.

Iman studied at the Cap21 Summer Intensive at NYU in 2007. After graduating magna cum laude, with a full academic scholarship from Howard University in 2008, (BFA in musical theatre), she began her career in regional theatre in her hometown of Atlanta. Her credits included The Rabbit in Goodnight Moon and Lucinda in Into the Woods (Alliance Theatre), Woman #1 in The Colored Museum, produced by Kenny Leon's True Colors Theatre Company., Daughter in Shakin’ the Mess Outta Misery (Horizon Theatre), and Erzulie in Once on this Island (Aurora Theatre).

== Career ==
Iman toured as a background vocalist for Lauryn Hill before moving to New York City, where she appeared Off-Broadway in Rent at New World Stages and in A Civil War Christmas at the New York Theatre Workshop.

Iman made her Broadway debut in 2013 as Nina Simone in Soul Doctor and was nominated for the Clive Barnes Award. She played Aldonza in Man of La Mancha at the Shakespeare Theatre Company in Washington, D.C., and was nominated for a Helen Hayes Award for Outstanding Lead Actress in a Musical.[8] In 2016 she appeared in the Broadway musical Shuffle Along, which received ten Tony Award nominations. In 2017 she played Peggy Schuyler and Maria Reynolds in the first national tour of Hamilton. In 2018 she played Crystal in Little Shop of Horrors at the Kennedy Center.

In 2022 Iman performed the one-woman show An Evening with Amber Iman at the Minetta Lane Theatre; Audible released a recording. That year she also played Nadira in the world premiere of Goddess at Berkeley Repertory Theatre and Rafaela in Lempicka at La Jolla Playhouse. In 2023 she played Pam Brown in Hippest Trip: The Soul Train Musical at American Conservatory Theater.

In 2024 Iman originated the role of Rafaela on Broadway in Lempicka at the Longacre Theatre, which closed in May of that year. She was nominated for the Tony Award for Best Featured Actress in a Musical and for a Drama League Award for Distinguished Performance. The same year she played Anita Hill in The Ford/Hill Project at the Public Theater. In 2025 she reprised the role of Nadira in Goddess Off-Broadway at the Public Theater. She joined the Broadway cast of Hadestown as Persephone on 1 September 2026.

Iman is a co-founder of the Broadway Advocacy Coalition, which received a special Tony Award in 2021, and of Black Women on Broadway.

== Stage credits ==
Year	Show	Role	Theatre	Notes
2013	Soul Doctor	Nina	Circle in the Square Theatre, Broadway	
2016	Shuffle Along...	Ensemble	Music Box Theatre, Broadway	
2018	Hamilton	Peggy Schuyler, Maria Reynolds	U.S. National Tour	
2018	Little Shop of Horrors	Crystal	Kennedy Center, Regional	
2022	Goddess	Nadira	Berkeley Rep, Regional	
2023	Hippest Trip—The Soul Train Musical	Pam Brown	American Conservatory Theater, Regional	
2024	Lempicka	Rafaela	Longacre Theatre, Broadway	
2024	The Ford/Hill Project	Anita Hill	The Public Theater, Off-Broadway	
2025	Goddess	Nadira	The Public Theater, Off-Broadway	
2026	Black Swan	Leroy	American Repertory Theater, Regional	
2026	Hadestown	Persephone	Walter Kerr Theatre, Broadway	

== Awards and nominations ==
Year	Award	Category	Work	Result	Notes
2024	Tony Awards	Best Featured Actress in a Musical	Lempicka	Nominated	
2024	Drama League Awards	Distinguished Performance	Lempicka	Nominated	
2026	Outer Critics Circle Award	Outstanding Lead Performer in an Off-Broadway Musical	Goddess	Nominated	
2026	Drama Desk Award	Outstanding Lead Performance in a Musical	Goddess	Nominated	
