= Carson Kreitzer =

American playwright

- Education: Yale University (BA); University of Texas, Austin (MFA)
- Occupation: Playwright
- Website: Official website

Carson Kreitzer is an American playwright currently based in Minneapolis, Minnesota. She graduated magna cum laude from Yale University in 1991 with a B.A. in theatre and literature and an M.F.A. from the Michener Center for Writers at the University of Texas, Austin.

Kreitizer is an associated artist with Clubbed Thumb, New Georges, the Fire Department, and Park Square Theatre, and was a resident playwright with New Dramatists from 2006-2013. She is a member of the Workhaus Collective, the Dramatists Guild, and The Playwrights' Center where, in 2013, she became a board member. Her plays The Love Song of J. Robert Oppenheimer and Self Defense, or death of some salesmen are published in the Smith and Kraus collections Women Playwrights: Best Plays of 2004 and 2002 respectively., and the plays Self Defense, Oppenheimer, 1:23, and Slither are available in one volume from NoPassport Press (2011).

== Full-length plays ==
- Heroin/e (Keep Us Quiet) (1995) is the first play in Kreitzer's Women Who Kill triptych featuring intertwined monologues spoken by two characters: Anna, the older sister of Sigmund Freud's famous patient, the Wolf Man, who committed suicide by drinking mercury in 1906 and Ellie Nesler, a woman who shot her son's accused molester as he was testifying in court. NYC premiere by Tiny Mythic Theatre.
- The Slow Drag (1996) a "jazz cabaret" with a live band onstage, which features the character, Johnny Christmas, performing the story of his life, a story that reflects that of American jazz musician Billy Tipton, whose successful career as a male crooner made headlines upon his death when it was revealed he was actually a woman.
- Freakshow (1999) published in the Playscripts anthology Funny, Strange, Provocative: Seven Plays From Clubbed Thumb
- Valerie Shoots Andy (2001) is the second Women Who Kill play and takes a close look at Valerie Solanas, author of the S.C.U.M. Manifesto and best known for shooting artist Andy Warhol in 1968. NYC Premiere by Reverie Productions at the Present Company Theatorium in NYC. Earlier version workshopped in 1993 at American Place Theatre by 40 Feet Under.
- Self Defense, or death of some salesmen (2002) is the final play of Women Who Kill, recounting the story of Aileen Wuornos, who was convicted of shooting six men along Florida's interstate highways in the early 1990s. It depicts the media frenzy surrounding her identification, capture and conviction but with a sympathetic eye towards Wuornos' claims of self-defense at the hands of violent clients she serviced as a prostitute. NYC Premiere by Reverie Productions with New Georges at HERE Arts Center.
- The Love Song of J. Robert Oppenheimer (2003) was nominated for the Pulitzer Prize in Drama and won the 2003 Lois and Richard Rosenthal New Play Prize, the American Theatre Critics’ Steinberg Citation, and the Barrie Stavis Award. Notable productions Actor's Express (Atlanta, GA) April 2005.
- Slither (2003) chronicles five generations of women, from Eve to a contemporary Christian snake-cult member, linked together through their relationship with snakes. 2003 premiere produced by Eye of the Storm Theatre at Minneapolis Theatre Garage (Minneapolis, MN). Received its West coast premiere in 2012 by Chalk Repertory with a staging at the Masonic Lodge inside Hollywood Forever Cemetery.
- Caravaggista traces the early life of the baroque artist Artemisia Gentileschi and focuses on the events surrounding the rape trial brought by her father against Agostino Tassi, another artist he had hired to teach his daughter Perspective. Throughout the play Artemisia is guided by the spirit of Caravaggio as she develops her masterwork Judith Slaying Holofernes. This play was workshopped at The Public Theater in New York.
- Flesh and the Desert (2005) originally commissioned by Clubbed Thumb with a premiere as part of the 2005 David Mark Cohen New Works Festival, this play is a kaleidoscopic portrait of Las Vegas featuring showgirls, gangsters, Siegfried and Roy, Elvis, Liberace, nuclear testing, Orson Welles, and the intertwined stories of three couples. Produced in 2012 by the Workhaus Collective and performed at The Playwright's Center in Minneapolis, MN making the Top 10 of 2012 list by the Star Tribune theater critics.
- 1:23 (2007) a "theatrical collage" about infamous cases of contemporary infanticide and the public's obsession with women who kill. The play uses characters from the annals of true crime, specifically Susan Smith, Andrea Yates, and the lesser-known Juana Leija. Premiered at Cincinnati Playhouse in the Park's Thompson Shelterhouse theater space in Feb. 2007, directed by Mark Wing-Davey. Notable productions at Synchronicity Performance Group (Atlanta, GA) in May 2009, Perishable Theatre (Providence, RI) in May 2011.
- Enchantment (2009)
- Behind the Eye (2011) chronicles the career and private life of surrealist muse/model and WWII combat photographer Lee Miller. Premiered at Cincinnati Playhouse in Apr. 2011, directed by Mark Wing-Davey and the production was nominated for 8 Acclaim Awards from the League of Cincinnati Theatres for its direction, acting, and design. Notable productions at Gas & Electric Arts (Philadelphia, PA) in Oct. 2012, Park Square Theatre (St. Paul, MN) in May 2014.
- Lasso of Truth (2014) commissioned by the National New Play Network for a rolling premiere in the 2014-15 season. This "multimedia theatrical event explores the history of Wonder Woman – from her creation as a comic book superhero character to her lasting influence in American pop culture". Workshop reading at National Play Festival (Australia) Feb. 2013. Premiered February. 2014 at Marin Theatre (Mill Valley, CA), November 2014 at Synchronicity Performance Group (Atlanta, GA), and January 2015 at the Unicorn Theatre (Kansas City) in Missouri.

== Awards and grants ==
- 2001-2002 McKnight Advancement Grant, Playwright's Center (Minneapolis, MN).
- 2003-2004 Susan Smith Blackburn Prize in playwriting.
- 2007 Playwrights Of New York (PONY) Fellowship at the Lark Play Development Center.
- 2008 "Core Writers" award from The Ruth Easton Lab at The Playwright's Center (Minneapolis).
- 2014 Joe Dowling Annaghmakerrig Fellowship through Guthrie Theatre and the Tyrone Guthrie Center at Annaghmakerrig, Ireland.
- 2016 Jonathan Larson Grant from the American Theatre Wing
- 2017 MacDowell Colony Fellowship

== Reviews ==
- Lasso of Truth from San Francisco Gate: The women are potent and the guys like it like that in Carson Kreitzer's Lasso of Truth, and that seems fitting for a play about Wonder Woman. Not that the world's premier female superhero makes any direct appearances in the world premiere that opened Tuesday at Marin Theatre Company, but aspects of her infuse the generations of feminists who inspired and were inspired by her in an idea-packed and brilliantly cartoon-enhanced play.
- Behind the Eye from City Beat Cincinnati: According to Carson Kreitzer's new script, Behind the Eye, premiering at the Cincinnati Playhouse, Lee Miller 'reflects light so well it seems that she herself is the source.' Miller, you see, is a forgotten but real historical figure, a photographer's model in Vogue in the 1920s, a photographer herself in the 1930s and a fearless photojournalist across Europe during World War II. By any standards she was promiscuous and willful, a free spirit for whom happiness was just beyond her grasp. She is the fascinating focal point for Kreitzer's compelling new play [...], perhaps the best piece of theater at the Playhouse this season.
- 1:23 from Atlanta's Creative Loafing: Playwright Carson Kreitzer's drama draws on elements of police procedurals like Law & Order in its investigation of the crimes of Susan Smith and two other notorious mothers who killed their children. In 1:23, we know whodunit, so the more pressing question becomes, 'Why did they do it?' Kreitzer's script finds clues in official records, urban legends and Latin-American folklore, placing the killings in complex, almost baffling cultural and psychological contexts. [...] Few themes prove as big or challenging as the ones raised in 1:23. If anything, the play's ambition nearly overleaps itself in its attempt to address too many ideas in too limited a time. 1:23 serves as a harrowing thematic symphony that can be overly pretentious and opaque, yet also builds to some genuine revelations.
- Valerie Shoots Andy from The New York Times: Ms. Kreitzer offers an assessment of how Solanas's play (Up Your Ass) and a diatribe she wrote shortly before the shooting called the SCUM manifesto evolved into gunshots. It is a bleak but fascinating piece that plays with Warhol's notions of repetition, returning to the shooting and its immediate aftermath again and again as it fleshes out the portrait of Solanas, who died in 1988.

== In development ==
- Runway 69 a new musical, "a provocative story of one of the raunchiest strip clubs in mid-1990s Times Square, and the lives of the men and women who work there." Workshopped at the 2013 The Ground Floor summer residency lab at Berkeley Rep. Book and lyrics by Krietzer; Music, Lyrics, and original concept by Erin Kamler.
- Lempicka a new musical inspired by "the tempestuous life of Art Deco artist Tamara de Lempicka." Commissioned by Yale Rep and New Dramatists. Book by Matt Gould and Kreitzer from an original concept by Kreitzer; lyrics by Krietzer; music Gould.
