= List of programmes broadcast by Disney Channel (Southeast Asia) =

This is a list of final and former television programs on Disney Channel in Southeast Asia and Bangladesh.

== Former programming ==
=== Disney Channel Originals ===
==== Animated ====
Title	Premiere date	Finale date	Note(s)
Timon & Pumbaa	2000	2009	
The New Adventures of Winnie the Pooh	2000	2005	Part of Playhouse Disney block
Hercules	2000	2008	
Doug	2000	2002	
Gargoyles	2001	2005	
Pepper Ann	2001	2008	
Recess	2001	2009	
Buzz Lightyear Of Star Command	2001	August 17, 2007	
Adventures of the Gummi Bears	2001	2008	
Mickey Mouse & Friends	2001	2013	
PB&J Otter	2001	2006	Part of Playhouse Disney block
Quack Pack	2001	2004	
Mickey Mouseworks	2001	2009	
The Little Mermaid	2001	December 31, 2007	
House of Mouse	2001	2010	
The Legend of Tarzan	January 26, 2002	2013	
The Weekenders	2002	2009	
Teacher's Pet	2002	2007	
Teamo Supremo	2002	2009	
Stanley	2002	2007	Part of Playhouse Disney block
Kim Possible	December 2002	2020	
101 Dalmatians	2003	2008	
The Proud Family	July 2003	2007	
Aladdin	2003	2008	
Goof Troop	2004	2007	
Lilo & Stitch: The Series	2004	2019	
Dave the Barbarian	September 4, 2004	2009	
American Dragon: Jake Long	February 12, 2005	2020	
Jojo's Circus	2005	July 6, 2007	Part of Playhouse Disney block
Brandy & Mr. Whiskers	2006	Unknown	
Chip N Dale's Rescue Rangers	2006	2017	
DuckTales	2006	Unknown	
The Buzz on Maggie	2006	2008	
Mickey Mouse Clubhouse	May 6, 2006	2016	Part of Playhouse Disney block
The Emperor's New School	2006	2020	
Higglytown Heroes	2007	July 4, 2007	Part of Playhouse Disney block
Little Einsteins	2007	2014	
The Replacements	March 17, 2007	2011	
The Replacements	2013	2020	
Donald Duck Presents	2007	2008	
Good Morning, Mickey!	2007	2010	
Fillmore!	2007	2008	
Phineas and Ferb	January 1, 2008	September 30, 2021	Moved to SKTV Edu (Vietnam)
My Friends Tigger & Pooh	January 5, 2008	2016	
Super Robot Monkey Team Hyperforce Go	January 15, 2010	2011	
Supa Strikes	April 24, 2010	September 30, 2021	
Fish Hooks	January 2011	September 30, 2020	
Doc McStuffins	2012	2017	
Handy Manny	2012	2014	
Have A Laugh!	2012	2012	
Jake and the Never Land Pirates	2013	2017	
Sofia the First	July 20, 2013	December 23, 2020	
Henry Hugglemonster	2014	2015	
Sheriff Callie's Wild West	2014	2016	
Star vs. the Forces of Evil	November 8, 2015	September 30, 2021	(Note: New episodes of season 1 - 3 premiered on Disney Channel prior to Disney XD) Moved to SKTV Edu (Vietnam)
The Lion Guard	March 20, 2016	July 31, 2018	
Miles from Tomorrowland	2016	2017	
Elena of Avalor	November 13, 2016	2018	
Elena of Avalor	December 16, 2020		
Goldie & Bear	2016		
Rapunzel's Tangled Adventure	May 21, 2017	September 30, 2021	
Mickey and the Roadster Racers	2017	July 31, 2018	
Big City Greens	August 6, 2018	September 30, 2021	
Amphibia	September 9, 2019	September 30, 2021	
The Owl House	March 20, 2020	September 26, 2021	
Disney Channel Japan
Stitch!	December 19, 2009	September 30, 2020	
Lucasfilm Animation
Star Wars Rebels	November 29, 2014	December 2018	
Star Wars Resistance	October 13, 2018	March 5, 2020	
Disney Channel UK
101 Dalmatian Street	October 5, 2019	July 26, 2020	(Note: The series moved to Disney XD on September 7, 2020.)
Shorts
Mickey Mouse	November 18, 2013	2021	
Descendants: Wicked World	2017	2021	
Tangled Short Cuts	2017	2021	
Star Wars Forces of Destiny	2017	2021	
Tsum Tsum	2017	2021	
Mickey Go Local	2019	2021	

==== Live-action ====
Title	Premiere date	Finale date	Note(s)
Flash Forward	2000	2000	
Bear In The Big Blue House	2000	2003	Part of Playhouse Disney block
The Famous Jett Jackson	2000	2002	
So Weird	2000	2005	
The Book of Pooh	2001	2003	Part of Playhouse Disney block
Lizzie McGuire	2001	2008	
That's So Raven	July 2003	June 2009	
Even Stevens	2004	August 28, 2007	Previously on Nickelodeon
Phil of the Future	November 13, 2004	December 2006	
Suite Life of Zack and Cody	October 2005	2011	
Hannah Montana	September 23, 2006	December 31, 2012	
Hannah Montana	2017		
Cory In The House	April 27, 2007	2009	
Wizards of Waverly Place	March 9, 2008	September 27, 2020	
The Suite Life on Deck	2008	December 31, 2012	
The Suite Life on Deck	2017		
Jonas	August 9, 2009	2011	
Sonny with a Chance	October 2009	December 31, 2012	
Good Luck Charlie	August 14, 2010	2019	
Shake It Up	March 12, 2011	2015	
Shake It Up	January 4, 2020	May 30, 2020	
A.N.T. Farm	October 2011	2014	(Note: Exclusively aired in Singapore)
Jessie	December 17, 2011	December 26, 2019	
Austin & Ally	March 3, 2012	2019	
Code: 9	2013		
Dog with a Blog	March 2, 2013	2016	
Liv and Maddie	January 10, 2014	May 3, 2020	
Win, Lose or Draw	May 30, 2014	September 2014	
Girl Meets World	November 14, 2014	December 2019	
I Didn't Do It	May 30, 2014	2016	
Best Friends Whenever	2015	December 25, 2019	
Best Friends Whenever	May 6, 2020	May 27, 2020	
Bunk'd	January 17, 2016	September 30, 2021	Moved to SKTV Life (Vietnam)
Bizaardvark	August 19, 2016	December 24, 2019	
Bizaardvark	May 5, 2020	May 26, 2020	
Stuck in the Middle	2016	2019	
Raven's Home	October 27, 2017	August 15, 2021	Moved to SKTV Life (Vietnam)
Coop and Cami Ask the World	January 5, 2019	February 28, 2021	
Coop and Cami Ask the World	July 3, 2021	July 31, 2021	
Fast Layne	April 5, 2019	April 26, 2019	
Sydney to the Max	July 5, 2019	August 27, 2021	Moved to SKTV Life (Vietnam)
Just Roll with It	September 16, 2019 (Singapore); October 16, 2020 (main feed)	May 10, 2020 (Singapore); August 14, 2021 (main feed)	
Gabby Duran & the Unsittables	December 13, 2019	June 20, 2021	
Disney Fam Jam	May 15, 2020 (Singapore)	May 31, 2020 (Singapore)	(Note: Currently on hiatus)
Disney Fam Jam	December 25, 2020 (Asia)		(Note: Currently on hiatus)
Secrets of Sulphur Springs	March 26, 2021	September 24, 2021	
Disney Channel Southeast Asia
As the Bell Rings (Singapore)	February 20, 2007	August 12, 2007	(Note: Singaporean version of As the Bell Rings)
Waktu Rehat	August 31, 2010	July 21, 2012	(Note: Malaysian version of As the Bell Rings)
Club Mickey Mouse (Malaysia)	September 15, 2017	2021	Moved to SKTV Kids (Vietnam)
Wizards of Warna Walk	August 30, 2019	September 2020	(Note: Malaysian version of Wizards of Waverly Place) (Note: The series premiered simultaneously on Disney Channel and Disney XD, new episodes premieres on Disney Channel.)
Disney Channel Latin America
Violetta	March 3, 2014 (Singapore); May 5, 2014 (Philippines)	Unknown	
O11CE	March 15, 2021	July 29, 2021	

=== Disney XD Originals ===
==== Animated ====
Title	Premiere date	Finale date	Note(s)
Kick Buttowski: Suburban Daredevil	May 28, 2010	June 30, 2020	
Gravity Falls	October 27, 2012	September 30, 2021	(Note: Beginning with season 2, new episodes premiered on Disney Channel prior to Disney XD)
Wander Over Yonder	2013	October 1, 2016	
The 7D	September 7, 2014	December 25, 2019	
Penn Zero: Part-Time Hero	April 13, 2015	March 2, 2018	
Randy Cunningham: 9th Grade Ninja	2015	September 30, 2020	
Milo Murphy's Law	February 10, 2017	September 26, 2021	
DuckTales (2017)	January 21, 2018	September 30, 2021	(Note: Beginning with episode 2, new episodes premiered on Disney Channel prior to Disney XD until episode 9. Once again, beginning with season 3, new episodes premieres on Disney Channel prior to Disney XD.)
Big Hero 6: The Series	May 13, 2018	September 30, 2021	(Note: Beginning with season 2 episode 19, new episodes premieres on Disney Channel prior to Disney XD)
Marvel Animation
Marvel's Spider-Man (2017)	October 14, 2017	September 30, 2021	
Shorts
Gravity Falls Shorts	October 2015	2021	

==== Live-action ====
Title	Premiere date	Finale date	Note(s)
Aaron Stone	May 29, 2009	2011	
Zeke and Luther	January 17, 2010	2011	
I'm in the Band	April 10, 2010	2011	
Pair of Kings	December 19, 2010	2014	
Lab Rats	2012	March 23, 2020	
Mighty Med	March 7, 2014	2014	
Kickin' It	2012	2014	
Player Select	March 19, 2021	2021	

=== Acquired programming ===
==== Animated ====
Title	Premiere date	Finale date	Original network	Note(s)
Gadget Boy & Heather	2001	2003	M6; The History Channel	
Sabrina: The Animated Series	2001	2008	UPN; ABC	Moved to Boomerang
Kipper	2001	2002	ITV	Part of Playhouse Disney block
Little Hippo	2001	2002	France 3	Part of Playhouse Disney block
Rolie Polie Olie	2001	Unknown	CBC Television; France 5	Part of Playhouse Disney block
Percy the Park Keeper	2001	2001	ITV	Part of Playhouse Disney block
The Adventures of Paddington Bear	2001	2002	Teletoon; Canal J	Part of Playhouse Disney block
Sheeep	2001	2002	CBBC	
Poochini	2001	2002	The WB	
Mummies Alive!	2001	2001	Syndication	
Transylvania Pet Shop	2001	2001	TF1; ITV	
Archie's Weird Mysteries	2001	2004	PAX; M6	
Bubu Chacha	2001	2004	Unknown	
Dinosaucers	2001	2003	Syndication	
Tales from the Cryptkeeper	2001	2008	YTV; ABC	
Arthur	2001	2003	PBS Kids	
Donkey Kong Country	2001	2002	Teletoon; France 2 Canal+	
The Lampies	2001	2002	CBBC	
Wheel Squad	2001	2004	M6; Rai Uno	
Inspector Gadget's Field Trip	2001	2001	The History Channel	
Esper Mami	2001	2001	TV Asahi	
Aesop World	2001	2004	TV Tokyo	
Wolves, Witches and Giants	2001	2002	CITV	
Robocop	2001	2001	Syndication	
Jumanji	2001	2003	UPN; Bohbot Kids Network	
Animal Crackers	December 2001	2002	Teletoon; La Cinquieme	
The All-New Dennis the Menace	December 2001	2002	CBS	
Ned's Newt	2002	2002	Teletoon	
Madeline	2002	2006	The Family Channel	Part of Playhouse Disney block; Moved to Boomerang
Pirate Family	2002	2002	France 3 KiKa	
Marsupilami	2002	2002	Canal J France 3	
Avenger Penguins	2002	2002	ITV	
Men in Black: The Series	2002	2003	Kids' WB	
Sagwa	2002	March 30, 2007	PBS Kids	
Adventures of Sonic the Hedgehog	2002	2003	Syndication	
Committed	2002	2004	CTV	
Student Bodies	2002	2003	YTV	
Totally Spies!	2002	2010	TF1; Teletoon	Moved to Nickelodeon
Tracey McBean	2002	2008	ABC Kids	
Tiny Planets	2002	July 6, 2007	Noggin	
Super Duper Sumos	2002	2004	Nickelodeon	
Untalkative Bunny	2002	2008	Teletoon	
Generation O!	December 2002	2004	Kids' WB	
Sonic the Hedgehog	2002	2003	ABC	
Super Dave	2002	2003	Fox Kids	
Evolution	January 2003	2003	Fox Kids	
Mr. Bean: The Animated Series	January 2003	2015	CITV	Moved to Cartoon Network and Yey! (Philippines)
Jackie Chan Adventures	February 1, 2003	2008	Kids' WB	
Extreme Ghostbusters	March 2003	2004	Bohbot Kids Network	Formerly on Cartoon Network
Sonic Underground	2003	2004	TF1	
Sabrina's Secret Life	2004	February 27, 2007	CBS	Moved to Boomerang
Potatoes and Dragons	2004	March 31, 2007	Canal J France 3 Teletoon	
The Big Knights	2004	2005	CBBC	
Martin Mystery	2004	2009	YTV; Canal J M6	
Clifford, The Big Red Dog	2005	2008	PBS Kids	Part of Playhouse Disney block
The Adventures of Little Brown Bear	2005	2005	France 5	Part of Playhouse Disney block
Strawberry Shortcake	May 2006	2008	HBO; DIC Kids Network	Moved to Boomerang
Tutenstein	2006	2008	Discovery Kids	
The Gnoufs	2006	2007	France 3	
Monster Allergy	2006	2010	Rai 2 Kika; M6	
Clifford's Puppy Days	2006	July 6, 2007	PBS Kids	Part of Playhouse Disney block
Save-Ums!	2006	July 6, 2007	Discovery Kids	Part of Playhouse Disney block
Shuriken School	2007	2010	France 3 Jetix	
Shaun the Sheep	April 2, 2007	2013	CBBC	Moved to Cartoon Network
Horseland	2007	2008	CBS	Moved to Boomerang
Maya & Miguel	2007	2008	PBS Kids Go!	
Shaolin Wuzang	November 16, 2007	2010	France 3 Jetix	
Bola Kampung	November 19, 2007	2010	TV2	
George Of The Jungle	November 19, 2007	2010	Teletoon; Cartoon Network	
Famous 5: On the Case	2008	2011	France 3 Super RTL	
W.I.T.C.H.	2008	2009	France 3 Jetix	
Monster Buster Club	2008	March 2009	TF1; YTV	
Pucca	2008	2021	Jetix; Netflix	Moved to K+ Kids (Vietnam)
A Kind of Magic	2008	2009	France 3	
Eliot Kid	2009	2009	TF1; CBBC	
The Amazing Spiez!	March 15, 2009	2010	TF1; Canal J Teletoon	
The Twisted Whiskers Show	May 8, 2009	2010	The Hub	
Yin Yang Yo!	June 18, 2009	2010	Jetix	
MetaJets	June 28, 2009	2010	Teletoon	
Oggy and the Cockroaches	August 1, 2009	December 31, 2013	France 3 Canal+ Gulli	Also on Cartoon Network, Boomerang and Nickelodeon
Jibber Jabber	September 11, 2009	2010	YTV	
Upin & Ipin	September 15, 2009	September 30, 2021	Originally aired	Moved to MNCTV (Indonesia) and SKTV Edu (Vietnam)
Get Ed	October 19, 2009	2010	Jetix	
Animal Mechanicals	2010	2010	CBC Television	
Dibo the Gift Dragon	2010	2014	EBS TV	(Note: Exclusively aired in the Philippines)
My Life Me	August 21, 2010	2010	Teletoon; France 2 Canal J	
Sally Bollywood: Super Detective	November 5, 2010	2011	France 3 Seven Network	
The Jungle Book	November 19, 2010	2013	TF1; ZDF	
Zig & Sharko	February 14, 2011	November 30, 2018	Canal+ TF1; Gulli	
Jackie Chan's Fantasia	June 4, 2011	2011	CCTV-1	
Boboiboy	June 11, 2011	June 2021	Originally aired	Moved to RTV (Indonesia)
Oscar's Oasis	2011	2012	Canal+ Family	
Dennis and GNasher	2011	2011	CBBC; Nine Network	
Scaredy Squirrel	July 17, 2011	2014	YTV	
Dreamkix	December 3, 2011	2012	Originally aired	
Rated A for Awesome	2012	2012	YTV	
Canimals	2012	2013	CITV	
Chimpui	November 14, 2012	2013	TV Asahi	
Dude, That's My Ghost!	June 2013	2014	BBC Kids	
Camp Lakebottom	November 16, 2013	2015	Teletoon; Disney XD	
Hello Jadoo	2013	2014	Tooniverse	
Ninja Hattori-kun	May 19, 2014	2016	TV Asahi	
The Pink Panther Show	July 14, 2014	2015	NBC; ABC	
Perman	2014	2017	Unknown	
Pac-Man and the Ghostly Adventures	2014	2016	Disney XD	
Chuggington	2014	2014	CBeebies	
Boyster	November 14, 2014	June 24, 2016	Disney XD; France 4	
Line Town	April 6, 2015	2017	TV Tokyo	
Zip Zip	July 13, 2015	2016	France 3	
Chuck Chicken	August 24, 2015	2021	Originally aired	
Harry & Bunnie	May 20, 2016	2020	Originally aired	
Oddbods	2016	2021	Originally aired	Moved to Mentari TV (Indonesia)
Kid vs. Kat	December 5, 2016	2017	YTV; Disney XD	Previously on Nickelodeon
The Owl & Co	2017		France 3	
Rolling with the Ronks!	2017		France 3	
Pokémon the Series: Black & White	April 3, 2017	2020	TV Tokyo; Disney XD (Southeast Asia)	Formerly on Cartoon Network
PJ Masks	April 3, 2017	2017	Disney Junior; France 5	
Slugterra	July 3, 2017	2017	Family CHRGD	(Note: Not aired in Singapore.)
Boboiboy Galaxy	July 7, 2017	2021	Originally aired	
Hotel Transylvania: The Series	October 2, 2017	September 30, 2021	Disney Channel; Teletoon	
Ejen Ali	December 15, 2017	2021	Originally aired	Moved to Disney+ (Philippines and Singapore) and Disney+ Hotstar (Indonesia, Malaysia and Thailand).
Beyblade	April 14, 2018	September 30, 2021	Disney XD (Southeast Asia)	Moved to SKTV Edu (Vietnam)
Miraculous: Tales of Ladybug & Cat Noir	November 6, 2018	September 30, 2021	Disney Channel	
Oswaldo	February 2, 2019	September 30, 2021	Cartoon Network (Brazil)	
Banzi's Secret Diary	2019	September 30, 2021	KBS1; KBS2	
Rabbids Invasion	July 8, 2019 (Season 4 only)	September 30, 2021	Netflix	(Note: Season 1 - 3 still aired on Nickelodeon, only Season 4 aired on Disney Channel)
Pokémon The Series: Sun & Moon	2019	September 30, 2021	Disney XD	
The Strange Chores	February 21, 2020	2021	ABC Me	
Kaitou Joker	May 23, 2020	2021	Disney XD (Southeast Asia)	
Cupcake & Dino: General Services	May 25, 2020	September 30, 2021	Netflix	
Shorts
Zombiedumb	October 2016	2021	KBS1	
Disney Toonmax's Stoney & Rocky	February 2018	2021	Toonmax	

==== Live-action ====
Title	Premiere date	Finale date	Original network	Note(s)
Crash Zone	2000	2000	Seven Network	
Dinosaurs	2000	2008	ABC	
Brotherly Love	2000	2000	NBC; The WB	
Thunderstone	2001	2002	Network Ten	
Boy Meets World	2001	2002	ABC	
Are You Afraid of the Dark?	2001	2003	YTV; Nickelodeon	Also on Nickelodeon
Caitlin's Way	2001	2002	Nickelodeon	Also on Nickelodeon
Art Attack	2001	2016	CITV	
Teen Angel	2001	2001	ABC	
Bill Nye the Science Guy	2001	2002	KCTS-TV; PTV Park	
Spellbinder	2001	2003	Nine Network	
Chuck Finn	2001	2003	Seven Network	
The Mystery Files of Shelby Woo	2001	2002	Nickelodeon	Also on Nickelodeon
100 Deeds for Eddie McDowd	2001	2004	Nickelodeon	Also on Nickelodeon
The Zack Files	2001	2008	YTV	
The Wonder Years	2002	2003	ABC	
Home Improvement	2002	2003	ABC	
Short Cuts	2002	2004	Seven Network	
America's Funniest Home Videos	2002	2009	ABC	
Bananas in Pyjamas	2002	2005	ABC (Australia)	Part of Playhouse Disney block
So Little Time	January 2003	February 2003	Fox Family	
S Club 7 in Hollywood	January 2003	2003	CBBC	
Viva S Club	August 31, 2003	2004	CBBC	
The Sleepover Club	2004	2008	Nine Network	
According to Jim	2005	2008	ABC	
My Wife and Kids	2005	2005	ABC	
Wicked Science	2005	July 2008	Network Ten	
Mortified	2006	2008	Nine Network	
Black Hole High	2007	2008	Global; Discovery Kids	
Mr. Bean	2007	2016	ITV	(Note: Moved to Kapamilya Channel, Jeepney TV, and A2Z (Philippines).)
Globo Loco	November 23, 2009	2010	ITV	
Just for Laughs Gags Asia	July 10, 2010	2010	Originally aired	
Just for Laughs Gags	2010	2013	TVA	
Hole in the Wall	November 9, 2012	2013	Fox; Cartoon Network	
Wipeout	2014		ABC	Also on AXN
Hi-5	March 1, 2014	December 2014	Nine Network	Series 13 only. Formerly on Nickelodeon
