= Lempicka (musical) =

2018 musical

- Broadway Promotional Poster
- Music: Matt Gould
- Lyrics: Carson Kreitzer
- Book: Matt Gould; Carson Kreitzer
- Setting: Paris, France
- Basis: The life of Tamara de Lempicka
- Premiere: July 20, 2018: Williamstown Theatre Festival
- Productions: 2018 Williamstown; 2022 La Jolla Playhouse; 2024 Broadway

Lempicka is a stage musical based on the life of Polish painter Tamara de Lempicka (1898–1980). In the musical, Lempicka must establish a new life for herself and her family in Paris after escaping the 1917 Russian Revolution. The musical features music by Matt Gould, lyrics by Carson Kreitzer, with a book by Gould and Kreitzer from an original concept by Kreitzer.

The show opened on Broadway at the Longacre Theatre on April 14, 2024 and closed on May 19, 2024 following 41 performances.

== Premise ==
The musical follows the life of Tamara de Lempicka as she flees the Russian Revolution to Paris, France with her husband, Tadeusz, and daughter, Kizette. Facing the rise of fascism, Tamara takes to painting to survive, and when she meets the free-spirited Rafaela, a prostitute on the fringes of Parisian society, she's torn between the life she cherishes with her husband and the passion, ambition, and possibility awoken in her by her new muse.

== Production history ==
=== Williamstown (2018) ===
The musical was originally commissioned by Yale Repertory Theatre and New Dramatists. Between 2011 and 2017, the musical underwent a series of labs and workshops. The musical premiered at the Williamstown Theatre Festival on July 20, 2018, running through August 1, 2018. The show is choreographed by Raja Feather Kelly and directed by Rachel Chavkin.

=== San Diego (2022) ===
The production made its West Coast premiere on June 14, 2022 at La Jolla Playhouse, running until July 24.

=== Broadway (2024) ===
The musical began previews on Broadway on March 19, 2024 at the Longacre Theatre and opened on April 14, 2024. The production team includes most of the team from La Jolla including Chavkin as director and Raja Feather Kelly as choreographer. Costumes were by Paloma Young and scene design by Riccardo Hernandez. It closed on May 19, 2024, after 27 previews and 41 regular performances, and following low box office grosses and a mostly negative critical reception. Despite this, the production received three nominations at the 77th Tony Awards, including Best Actress in a Musical (Eden Espinosa) and Best Featured Actress in a Musical (Amber Iman).

== Musical numbers ==
Act I

- ”Overture” - Orchestra
- "Unseen" - Tamara
- "Our Time" - Company
- "Starting Over" - Tamara, Tadeusz
- "Paris" - Tamara, Tadeusz, Company
- "Plan and Design" - Marinetti, Tamara
- "Don't Bet Your Heart" - Rafaela, Suzy, Company
- "I Will Paint Her" - Tamara
- "Perfection" - Marinetti, Company
- "Wake Up" - Tadeusz
- "Mama Look At Me" - Kizette, Tamara
- "The Most Beautiful Bracelet" - Rafaela
- "Woman Is" - Tamara

Act II

- "Pari Will Always Be Pari" - Marinetti, Company
- "The New Woman" - Tamara, Tadueusz
- "Women" - Suzy, Company
- "Stay" - Rafaela
- "What She Sees" - Rafaela, Taduesz
- "Here It Comes" - Tamara, Company
- "Speed" - Tamara, Rafaela, Tadeusz, Marinetti, Company
- "Just This Way" - Baroness, Tamara
- "In The Blasted California Sun" - Tamara
- "Finale" - Company

== Synopsis ==
=== Act 1 ===
Lempicka opens with an older version of Tamara de Lempicka muttering to herself while painting in 1970s California. She describes her woes of loving two people at once and reminisces on her life, asking "How did I wind up here?" The screen behind Tamara opens up and she changes to become a younger version of herself (Poland, 1918) ("Unseen"). Tamara is in a wedding dress, painting, as we are introduced to her mother and then Tadeusz Lempicki, a Polish aristocrat and the man she will be marrying. Tadeusz’s father mentions his distaste for Tamara, whose late father was Jewish.

After the wedding, Tadeusz is arrested for plotting with the Tsar as the Russian Revolution is underway. Tamara is able to convince two guards to let her through to her husband by paying them with expensive jewelry, but the third guard is not moved and insists that Tamara give him her body to use for the night. Tamara gives in and frees Tadeusz ("Our Time"). Now, Tamara and Tadeusz are on a train to Paris, Tamara hopes that their daughter, Kizette, will never have to experience their hardships, as Tadeusz ponders how his wife got him out ("Starting Over").

When they arrive, Tamara comments that Paris is the "ugliest beautiful city" she's ever seen. Tadeusz continues asking how she got him out, but Tamara does not tell him. Tamara encourages her husband to get a job, because they have no remaining money, jewels, or political influence to help them survive in Paris, but Tadeusz is insulted by her suggestion that he take a bank job or, worse, that she look for work herself. Eventually, Tamara sees a painter selling his work and decides that she could make a living by painting. She attempts to create a still life painting of "Three Madeleines" before eating them all and deciding she should stick to human subjects. Tamara attempts to sell art to the Baron and the Baroness, the former of who recommends she goes to see Filippo Tommaso Marinetti to teach her art. Marinetti asks Tamara to show him something he hasn't seen before. Then, the scene switches to Tamara painting in her home, with Kizette, now a child, and Tadeusz dancing, the Baron shows up and she sells two paintings. Armistice is declared and Tamara sees her chance with painting in Paris ("Paris").

Tamara is with Marinetti in his studio as he reprimands her paintings of nude women. Tamara argues that it is her job as a painter to capture life as it is, with all its imperfections, while Marinetti argues that "a painting is not a woman... a painting is a flat surface, covered with paint," and that she, as the painter, should endeavor to paint perfection to way it cannot exist in the real world - “we do not control the world, we control one flat rectangle of canvas at a time” ("Plan and Design"). Outside, a car drives in with Rafaela, the “songbird of the streets,” on top. She sings about how love is like roulette and not worth it, and Tamara wonders who she is, before Rafaela and her friend Suzy Solidor run away when the police arrive ("Don't Bet Your Heart"). Tamara is inspired, and sets out to paint Rafaela, saying that she "won't rest 'til [she has] her.. portrait" ("I Will Paint Her").

Tamara is exhibiting at her first group show, to much criticism. where Marinetti is once again annoyed of all the repetitive art that Tamara and the other artists have created. He sings about Futurism and a distaste for humanity, claiming that only machines can acquire perfection ("Perfection"). Tamara then asks if she can paint Rafaela, promising her immortality as an image. Then, Tadeusz walks in before applying for his first job, reflecting on his new life and everything he's lost. He isn't sure how to be strong enough for his wife ("Wake Up").

Tamara returns several times to the Dead Rat Cafe in search of Rafaela. Then, she is at home painting as Kizette tries to get her mother to pay attention to her instead of her easel for once ("Mama Look at Me"). Tamara asks Kizette to call her "Chérie" instead of "Mama." The scene shifts back to the Dead Rat, where Tamara has finally found Rafaela again. Tamara discusses her vision for the painting, and they discuss their pasts; Rafaela’s as a prostitute on the fringe of society and Tamara once again thinking about how she traded her body for her husband’s life. The two share a charged moment of chemistry, when Rafaela helps Tamara smoke from her opium pipe by blowing the smoke into her mouth. Suzy warns Rafaela about being seen acting this way with Tamara in public, and fantasizes about the future when she will open her own club where they can finally be themselves. Rafaela sings a song for the patrons of the club, flirting with the men but looking only at Tamara (“The Most Beautiful Bracelet”). After leaving the club, the two kiss, and spend the night in Tamara’s studio. Tamara paints Rafaela as she sleeps (“Woman Is”).

=== Act 2 ===
Tamara shows her portrait of Rafaela to the Baron and Baroness, and signs it as “Lempicka” instead of the male version of her surname that she had previously used. Marinetti sings about Paris being immovable after World War I, that the stock market crashes will not disturb them, and that there will never be another Great War. Chilling images of World War II are projected behind him as the song becomes more frenzied and time spins forward to 1933. The Baroness worries about Adolf Hitler’s rising power and wonders if her husband, who is of Jewish origin, will be safe. Tamara, whose father was also Jewish, plans for any emergency that would require her family to need to leave the country. Meanwhile, she is said to be taking over Paris with her artwork ("Pari Will Always Be Pari").

Tadeusz returns home to see his wife painting, and they discuss not being a normal couple and the fact that they are both seeing other women. Tadeusz compares Tamara to the “New Woman,” the feminist ideal taking over Europe. He jokes that his life would be easier if he found a new woman who would act demure and do whatever he wanted, but concludes that he doesn’t need anything as long as he is with a woman who loves him, and he hopes that Tamara can still be that woman. He also mentions being offered a job in Warsaw, and asks Tamara to move back to Poland with him. ("The New Woman"). Tamara and Rafaela go to Suzy's new lesbian club, The Monocle. Suzy sings about the beauty of women, and many in the room talk to and commission Tamara due to her newfound fame ("Women").

Rafaela tells Tamara that she wants to go to one of her art shows, which Tamara forbids because she doesn't want anyone to know about them being lovers. Tamara gives Rafaela a bracelet and professes her love. Rafaela sings about her backstory and about how she might stay with a lover for once, juxtaposing her previous assertion that "love is for fools." (“Stay”). When Rafaela is alone, Kizette enters the studio and manipulates Rafaela into seeing Tamara at the International Exposition. Tamara relates herself to her painting of Adam and Eve.

Rafaela walks into the exposition, and Kizette drags Tadeusz there as well. Tadeusz and Rafaela see each other and discuss Tamara's view of both of them; Tadeusz says he is sure Tamara will stay with him, saying that “she needs me on her arm to get away with painting you,” while Rafaela says she is the only one who can make her feel alive ("What She Sees"). They both confront Tamara, and the Baron and Baroness show up, along with Marinetti — he reveals that he has joined the Italian Fascists, who have adopted Futurism as their official art movement. The Baron and Baroness leave due to this news, and Marinetti cautions Tamara about being seen in public with Rafaela, telling her that her chance at greatness will shatter if news comes out about her being queer. He says that Paris will not be Paris for long. Tamara reflects on what might happen if she has to leave, and that she wants to be able to paint what is real rather than what is perfection ("Here It Comes").

Tadeusz confronts Tamara and tells her to choose between him and Rafaela. Tamara says she has always fought for everything but he hasn’t. Tadeusz says that she doesn't think about what he wants, and mentions that he met a woman named Irene. Tamara breaks down and tells him what she did to rescue him from the Russian prison. The scene changes to Rafaela, who attempts to give her bracelet back to Tamara. She says that she doesn't want to be hidden from the world, and asks Tamara to leave Tadeusz to be with her, but Tamara refuses, so Rafaela leaves. Tamara goes back to Tadeusz, but he says it's too late. Marinetti and the Blackshirts arrest Suzy and everybody in The Monocle, and the club is destroyed ("Speed").

The Baroness visits Tamara in her studio, where she finds that a devastated Tamara has injured herself by cutting her wrist. The Baroness says that she has just been diagnosed with a terminal illness, and doctors have told her she has two more months left to live. She asks that Tamara go to live with the Baron, and commissions a portrait of herself so that the Baron may always remember her ("Just This Way"). Tamara, Kizette, and the Baron move to Los Angeles, California. Tamara once again reminisces about her new life where she doesn't paint and doesn't exhibit anymore, and nobody seems to know who she is. She mentions how she has outlived everyone, mentioning both the Baron’s passing ("In The Blasted California Sun").

Tamara imagines a vision of Rafaela, who tells her she will never know what truly happened to her after their relationship ended. When she asks Rafaela what her life was for with everything and everyone she loved now gone, Rafaela says that the "sleek, powerful" women Tamara painted long ago are now "taking over the world." Some time later, her artwork is rediscovered in Paris, celebrated, and auctioned off for millions of dollars. The myriad women Tamara painted pass her by, and she realizes that by representing them as unique and diverse, she has fulfilled her vision of the future. Tamara looks out towards the audience, singing that "We do not control the world. We control one flat rectangle of canvas at a time" ("Finale").

== Characters and original casts ==
Character	Williamstown	San Diego	Broadway
Character	2018	2022	2024
Tamara de Lempicka	Eden Espinosa	Eden Espinosa	Eden Espinosa
Tadeusz Lempicki	Andrew Samonsky	Andrew Samonsky	Andrew Samonsky
Rafaela	Carmen Cusack	Amber Iman	Amber Iman
Filippo Tommaso Marinetti	Steven Rattazzi	George Abud	George Abud
Kizette	Alexandra Templer	Jordan Tyson	Zoe Glick
Raoul Kuffner de Diószegh (The Baron)	Nathaniel Stampley	Victor E. Chan	Nathaniel Stampley
Cara Carolina Kuffner de Diószegh (The Baroness)	Rachel Tucker	Jacquelyn Ritz	Beth Leavel
Suzy Solidor	Natalie Joy Johnson	Natalie Joy Johnson	Natalie Joy Johnson

== Awards and nominations ==
=== 2024 Broadway production ===
Year	Award	Category	Nominee	Result
2024	Drama League Awards	Outstanding Production of a Musical		Nominated
2024	Drama League Awards	Distinguished Performance	Eden Espinosa	Nominated
2024	Drama League Awards	Distinguished Performance	Amber Iman	Nominated
2024	Tony Awards	Best Actress in a Musical	Eden Espinosa	Nominated
2024	Tony Awards	Best Featured Actress in a Musical	Amber Iman	Nominated
2024	Tony Awards	Best Scenic Design in a Musical	Ricardo Hernández and Peter Nigrini	Nominated
2024	Dorian Awards	Outstanding Broadway Musical		Nominated
2025	GLAAD Media Awards	Outstanding Broadway Production		Won
