= Emojiland =

Off-Broadway musical

- A textistential new musical
- Logo for the 2022 Garrick Theatre Production
- Music: Keith Harrison Dworkin
- Lyrics: Keith Harrison Dworkin; Laura Schein
- Book: Keith Harrison Dworkin; Laura Schein
- Productions: 2018 Acorn Theater at Theater Row, New York Musical Theatre Festival; 2020 The Duke on 42nd Street, Off-Broadway; 2022 Palace Theatre, Columbus, Ohio; 2022 Garrick Theatre; 2026 St. Luke’s Rotunda Theater

Emojiland is a pop musical written by Keith Harrison Dworkin and Laura Schein. It premiered off-Broadway on January 19, 2020, at the Duke on 42nd Street. It centers around a group of emojis living in the world of a smartphone on the eve of a software update.

== Background ==
"Emojiland is an electric ensemble piece about a diverse community of archetypes who take one another at face value: a smiling face dealing with depression; a princess who doesn’t want a prince; a skull dying for deletion; a nerd face too smart for his own good; a face with sunglasses who can’t see past his own reflection; and a police officer and construction worker who just want to work together. When a software update threatens to destroy life as they know it, Emojiland faces the most fundamental questions a society – and a heart – can face: Who are we? And who matters?"

== Productions ==
Emojiland was first performed live in concert in Los Angeles.

Emojiland was first presented in New York City on July 22, 2018, as part of the New York Musical Theatre Festival. It was staged at the Acorn Theater at Theater Row.

=== Off-Broadway ===
After its success as part of the New York Musical Theatre Festival, the show premiered Off-Broadway on January 19, 2020, at The Duke on 42nd Street.

It starred Lesli Margherita as Princess, Josh Lamon as Prince, George Abud as Nerd Face, Laura Schein as Smiling Face with Smiling Eyes aka Smize, Lucas Steele as Skull, and Ann Harada as Pile of Poo.

The production was directed by Thomas Caruso and choreographed by Kenny Ingram, with musical direction by Lena Gabrielle. It featured scenic design by David Goldstein, costume and make-up design by Vanessa Leuck, lighting design by Jamie Roderick, sound design by Ken Goodwin, hair and wig design by Bobbie Zlotnik, and projection design by Lisa Renkel and Possible Productions.

The musical was a Critic's Pick from The New York Times and played a total of 11 Previews and 59 Performances before the COVID-19 shutdown.

In May 2022, the show announced a non-union national tour beginning in June 2022, but was subsequently cancelled after its first stop in Columbus, Ohio. Though it ended early, the tour production was captured live in Columbus with plans for it to be released, though no more news has been heard as of August 2024.

=== West End Concert ===
In October 2022 a one-off concert version of the show was held at the Garrick Theatre in heart of London’s West End. It featured a star-studded British cast including Olly Dobson as Skull, Louise Dearman as Princess, Hannah Lowther as Kissyface and Natalie Paris as Construction Worker.

=== 3Below Theaters Production ===
In October 2024, a new condensed version of the show will run from October 17 - November 24, 2024 at the 3Below Theater in San Jose. The condensed version cut the two ensemble roles of People Dancing, introduced one new role ("Angry Face") and doubled characters to trim the cast from fourteen to eight people.

=== Tapestry Players ===
In January 2026, the community theatre Tapestry Players ran a production of Emojiland from January 22 to February 1 at St. Luke's United Methodist Church in Houston, Texas, directed by David Gow. Most of the original script was intact, except that "Princess is a Bitch" being changed to "Princess is the Worst". This production added a scene involving Father Christmas at the top of Act 2 before "Firewall Ball."

== Synopsis ==
=== Act 1 ===
Inside a smartphone, emojis of all shapes and sizes go about their daily lives, exclaiming "It's Just So Great to Be Alive". Of them, we are introduced to Information Desk Person, informing everyone of the upcoming update for version 5.0; Smiling Face with Smiling Eyes and Smiling Face with Sunglasses (respectively called Smize and Sunny), who have been a couple since version 1.0; the not-so-benevolent ruler Princess, her loyal Guardsman, and greedy Man in Business Suit Levitating; Construction Worker and Police Officer, partners in work and love; and a death-obsessed Skull, who reflects on his contrary feelings toward being alive.

Smize, alone for a moment, reveals that despite her happy expression, she is secretly "Sad on the Inside". She hides this from everyone by self-medicating through smelling a pink hibiscus emoji. Meanwhile, Princess acknowledges that she enjoys being a self-described "bitch", and forces her subjects to dance for her amusement ("Princess Is a Bitch").

All of the emojis gather together at "The Progress Bar" as it counts up to 100 percent, celebrating the arrival of update 5.0 and the new emojis that will come with it. Included in the new faces are Nerd Face and Prince.

Nerd Face is instantly enamoured with his surroundings and nature of his existence. His first interaction is with Smize, and to her surprise, he immediately recognises her deceptively happy guise. Ever the optimist, he tells her about how their whole world is made up of binary code, and how their and their surroundings' existence is miraculous, to which she eventually agrees ("Zeroes & Ones"). After this, Sunny comes along and, jealous, bullies Nerd Face and forces Smize to leave with him. At this moment, Skull comes across a lonely Nerd Face, and, knowing his kindness and knowledge of the phone's code, asks if he can help him delete himself, to which Nerd Face, wanting to be a good friend, reluctantly agrees ("Cross My Bones").

At the castle, Princess is horrified to discover the new Prince emoji making himself at home, claiming he has the same royalty status as her ("New Crown in Town"). The two bicker for awhile before being interrupted by Man in Business Suit Levitating, who warns them that their situation could get worse if another crown-wearing emoji—like a King or Queen—gets installed in a later update, suggesting that they combat this by building a firewall, stopping all future updates and keeping out any new emojis. The royals agree to commission the firewall and throw a ball to appease their subjects.

At their home, Construction Worker and Police Officer enjoy breakfast and each other's company ("Work Together"). However, their cozy morning is interrupted by Man in Business Suit Levitating commanding Construction Worker begin building the firewall. Construction Worker opposes the order, believing that blocking out the updates isn't in the interest of a majority of emojis, including herself ("Stand For"). Princess, outraged by the refusal, demands Police Officer enforces the construction, and despite her personal feelings, Police Officer does so.

Nerd Face creates a virus for Skull, intending it to only be used for his self-deletion, but when Skull gets his hands on it, he threatens to release it to all of Emojiland, believing that every emoji would be better off deleted ("Thank Me Now"). During this, Police Officer enforces Construction Worker's building of the firewall, and the act ends with the firewall built and the virus released.

=== Act 2 ===
Act 2 begins with emojis singing and dancing at the "Firewall Ball", which has mostly succeeded in distracting everyone from the reality of future updates being blocked. At the ball, Smize catches Sunny cheating on her with Kissy Face, and she runs to a bathroom. As she cries, the Pile of Poo emoji finds Smize and offers her some words of wisdom and perspective ("Pile of Poo").

Working in the desert, Construction Worker calls Police Officer to say that she's freezing, exhibiting the first symptoms of Skull's released "Virus". Information Desk Person reports additional cases, and warns listeners that infected emojis may be deleted, panicking emojis everywhere. Princess, unaware of Skull's wrongdoings, asks Man in Business Suit Levitating how the virus got in with the firewall up, to which he insists it was spread by new emojis from the most recent update. Princess immediately calls for the arrest of Prince emoji, and Information Desk Person warns old emojis to stay away from new emojis and those infected, before crashing herself. Smize goes to Sunny's place to take her things back, but finds an infected Sunny who confesses he's been cheating on her with Kissy Face since version 3.0.

Construction Worker and Police Officer reunite and share a tearful goodbye, where Construction Worker gives Police Officer a firewall encryption key before crashing and disappearing in her arms. Police Officer, devastated, sings that she doesn't want anything more than "A Thousand More Words" with her partner.

Smize and Nerd Face reunite, and a defeated and hopeless Nerd Face admits to creating the virus and regrets not creating an antidote. Smize, infected and starting to crash, encourages him to be the hero and save the day ("Anyway"). Inspired by her words, Nerd Face collects the encryption key from Police Officer and breaks through the firewall to try and find the factory reset button, undoing the virus's damage. As he reaches to press it, Skull appears to stop him, saying that even with a reset, every emoji still has its flaws, history is doomed to repeat itself, and nothing matters. Nerd Face insists that love is what matters, and if they avoid deletion now, they can "Start Again". Eventually, Skull gives in, but as he does, the two begin to crash and freeze. Together, they use their combined strength to push the reset button.

After the factory reset, all of the emojis go about their lives as they did at the beginning of the show, having no memory of the events that just occurred. This time, however, Sunny and Kissy Face wind up together from the start, Princess and Prince coexist as rulers, Construction Worker and Police Officer are alive and well, and Smize and Nerd Face share a moment ("It's Just So Great to Be Alive (Reprise)").

== Musical numbers ==
Act 1

- "Overture" – Orchestra
- "It’s Just So Great To Be Alive" – Company
- "Sad On The Inside" – Smize
- "Princess Is a Bitch" – Princess
- "The Progress Bar" – Company
- "Zeros & Ones" – Nerd Face, Smize
- "Cross My Bones" - Skull, Nerd Face
- "New Crown In Town" – Prince
- "Work Together" – Police Officer, Construction Worker
- "Stand For" – Construction Worker
- "Thank Me Now" – Skull

Act 2

- "Entr’acte" – Orchestra
- "Firewall Ball" – Prince, Princess, Sunny, Company
- "Pile Of Poo" – Pile of Poo
- "Virus" – Company
- "A Thousand More Words" – Police Officer
- "Anyway" – Smize, Nerd Face
- "Start Again" – Nerd Face, Skull
- "It’s Just So Great To Be Alive (Reprise)" – Company

== Characters and original casts ==
Character	New York Musical Festival (2018)	Off-Broadway Premiere (2020) The Duke on 42nd Street	US Tour (2022)	West End Concert (2022)	3Below Theaters (2024)	Tapestry Players (2026)
Smize (Smiling Face)	Laura Schein	Laura Schein	Sarah Isola	Laura Baldwin	Emily Anne Goes	Margaret Lebrun
Nerd Face	Keith Harrison	George Abud	Sheridan Mirador	Blake Patrick Anderson	Tuânminh Albert Đỗ	Efren Calderon
Princess	Lesli Margherita	Lesli Margherita	Gina Morgigno	Louise Dearman	Aeriol Ascher	Alexandra Szeto-Joe
Pile of Poo	Jessie Alagna	Ann Harada	Maeghin Mueller	Hiba Elchikhe	Aeriol Ascher	Lydia Jackson
Prince	Josh Lamon	Josh Lamon	Steven Klenk	Oliver Savile	James Creer	Jake Woodson
Skull	Jordon Bolden	Lucas Steele	Michael C. Brown	Olly Dobson	Alan Palmer	James Hamrick
Person in Business Suit Levitating*	Alex Kunz	Max Crumm	Dahlya Glick	Jonny Weldon	Alan Palmer	Eric Skiles
Sunny (Sunglasses)	Cooper Howell	Jacob Dickey	Christopher Hobson	Dean John-Wilson	Frankie Mulcahy	Adam Kral
Guard	Brandon L. Armstrong	Dwelvan David	Keith Mankowski	Tim Mahendran	Frankie Mulcahy	Graham Baker
Construction Worker	Megan Kane	Natalie Weiss	Jaden Dominique Lewis	Natalie Paris	BrieAnne Alisa Martin	Staci Merritt
Angry Face					BrieAnne Alisa Martin	Travis Larsen
Information Desk Person	Chloe Fox	Heather Makalani	Oshie Mellon	Hannah Lowther	BrieAnne Alisa Martin	Kay Stuart
Kissy Face		Heather Makalani	Oshie Mellon	Hannah Lowther	Osher Fine	Lauren Lawson
Police Officer	Angela Wildflower	Felicia Boswell	Zachary A. Myers	Renee Lamb	Osher Fine	Marla Sanders
Person Dancing #1°		Tanisha Moore	Alana Walker			Juan Trujillo
Person Dancing #2°		Jordan Fife Hunt	Andrew Tufano			Juan Trujillo
Weary Face						Juan Trujillo
Father Christmas						David Bruce
Pregnant Person**						Scott D. Forsyth
Thinking Face						Andrew Stuart
Worried Face						Hayden Messamore

*The role was originally "Man In Business Suit Levitating," but was changed to "Person In Business Suit Levitating" in the US Tour and onward.

°Person Dancing #1 and #2 both were named Woman Dancing and Man Dancing, respectively, prior to the US Tour.

**The role was originally "Pregnant Woman," but was changed to "Pregnant Person" after the US Tour and onward.

== Awards and honors ==
=== Original Off-Broadway production ===
Year	Award	Category	Nominee	Result
2020	Lucille Lortel Awards	Outstanding Projection Design	Lisa Renkel and Possible	Nominated
2020	Drama Desk Awards	Outstanding Featured Actor in a Musical	George Abud	Nominated
2020	Drama Desk Awards	Outstanding Costume Design of a Musical	Vanessa Leuck	Nominated
2020	Drama Desk Awards	Outstanding Projection Design	Lisa Renkel and Possible Productions	Nominated
2020	Drama Desk Awards	Outstanding Wig and Hair Design	Bobbie Zlotnik	Nominated
2020	Outer Critics Circle Awards	Outstanding Costume Design	Vanessa Leuck	Won
2020	Outer Critics Circle Awards	Outstanding Projection Design	Lisa Renkel and Possible Productions	Won
