= Priscilla Lopez =

American singer, dancer, and actress

- Born: February 26, 1948 (age 78); The Bronx, New York, U.S.
- Occupations: Actress, singer, dancer
- Years active: 1960s–present
- Spouse: Vincent Fanuele
- Children: 2
- Awards: Tony Award for Best Performance by a Featured Actress in a Musical; 1980 A Day in Hollywood / A Night in the Ukraine

Priscilla Lopez (born February 26, 1948) is an American singer, dancer, and actress. She is perhaps best known for originating the role of Diana Morales in A Chorus Line. She has had the distinction of appearing in two Broadway landmarks: one of its greatest hits, the highly acclaimed, long-running A Chorus Line, and, as a teenager, in one of its biggest flops, the infamous musical version of Breakfast at Tiffany's, which closed before opening night.

== Early life ==
Lopez was born in the Bronx, New York to Francisco Lopez, a hotel banquet foreman and Laura (née Candelaria), who had moved to New York from their native Puerto Rico.

== Career ==
=== Broadway ===
Lopez graduated from Manhattan's High School of Performing Arts, where she majored in drama. Had Tiffany's survived, it would have marked her debut on Broadway, but the production was plagued with so many problems that its creative team deemed it impossible to fix. From there, she moved on to Henry, Sweet Henry, which lasted only two months at the end of 1967, when she was 19 years old. Her luck was no better the following year when Her First Roman lasted two weeks.

Nevertheless, Lopez continued to work and earn credits, most notably as a replacement in featured roles in Company, choreographed by Michael Bennett, and Pippin, choreographed by Bob Fosse. When Michael Bennett helped organize the workshops leading to A Chorus Line, he recruited Lopez based on his experience with her. A Chorus Line (1975) had Lopez portraying Diana Morales, a character patterned after herself. She introduced the hit song "What I Did for Love", and sang "Nothing", a song about a disastrously unsupportive drama class at the High School of Performing Arts.

In A Day in Hollywood / A Night in the Ukraine (1980), Lopez stepped out of the ensemble and into the spotlight, displaying her comedic and vocal skills. The show had two acts, first a mini-musical about the early days of movie making, by Dick Vosburgh and Frank Lazarus with additional material by Jerry Herman, and second a send-up of the slapstick Marx Brothers movies, with Lopez playing Harpo. Both she and the show received rave reviews; it ran nearly a year-and-a-half, and she earned a Tony Award for Best Featured Actress in a Musical. In 1982, Tommy Tune, with whom she had worked in Hollywood/Ukraine, hired her as his assistant on Nine, the musical version of the Federico Fellini film 8½. Midway through the run, she joined the cast taking over for Tony-winner Liliane Montevecchi in the role of Liliane La Fleur. Lopez also appeared on Broadway in the critically acclaimed play Anna in the Tropics in 2003. From 2008 to 2011, Lopez appeared as Camilla in the Broadway production of In the Heights. She took over the role of Berthe in the revival of Pippin from Annie Potts on July 22, 2014 through August 31 2014.

=== Off-Broadway ===
Her off-Broadway credits include Other People's Money, Key Exchange, Extremities, The Oldest Profession, Beauty of the Father and Class Mother '68, for which she was nominated for a Drama Desk Award for Outstanding Solo Performance. She was featured in the City Center Encores! production of Babes in Arms.

In 2021, Lopez was featured as Mabel in the internet musical Ratatouille: The Tiktok Musical, referencing both "Nothing" and "What I Did For Love" with alternated lyrics for the character and situation. Lopez starred in The Gardens of Anuncia, a musical by Michael John LaChiusa about the life of Graciela Daniele, portraying the older version of Daniele.

=== Television ===
Lopez starred as a liberal nun in an unsuccessful Norman Lear series In the Beginning with McLean Stevenson in 1978. She had a guest role on the ABC drama Family, starring Kristy McNichol and Sada Thompson; she played Buddy's (McNichol) dance friend in the disco episodes. In 1983, she was the voice of Herself the Elf in the animated TV special The Magic of Herself the Elf. She had a key role in the short-lived 1986 medical drama Kay O'Brien. In 1993, Lopez starred in the television movie For the Love of My Child: The Anissa Ayala Story, in which she played a mother who, along with her husband, conceives a child to provide a suitable bone-marrow donor for their older daughter. Other television work includes L.A. Law, Law & Order, All in the Family, Trapper John, M.D., Cosby, and B Positive. In 2021, she portrayed Abuela Sofia in the Disney Channel Original Movie, Christmas...Again?!.

=== Film ===
She had a brief role in Center Stage, and she appeared in Maid in Manhattan playing the mother of Jennifer Lopez's character, and had a role in the film version of the long-running off-Broadway hit Tony n' Tina's Wedding. She appeared in the film Musical Chairs as the disapproving mother of E.J. Bonilla's character.

== Stage credits ==
Year	Title	Role	Venue	Ref.
1967	Henry, Sweet Henry	Adult Ensemble	Broadway, Palace Theatre	
1968	Her First Roman	Egyptian	Broadway, Lunt-Fontanne Theatre	
1970	The Boy Friend	Maisie	Regional, The National Theatre	
1970	Company	Kathy	Broadway, Alvin Theatre	
1972	Lysistrata	Myrrhine	Broadway, Brooks Atkinson Theatre	
1974	Pippin	Fastrada	Broadway, Imperial Theatre	
1975	A Chorus Line	Diana	Off-Broadway, New York Shakespeare Festival	
1975	A Chorus Line	Diana	Broadway, Shubert Theatre	
1977	Irma La Douce	Irma La Douce	Regional, Los Angeles Civic Light Opera	
1980	A Day in Hollywood / A Night in the Ukraine	Ensemble, Gino	John Golden Theatre	
1981	Key Exchange	Lisa	Off-Broadway, Orpheum Theatre	
1982	Buck	Performer	Off-Broadway, Playwrights Horizons	
1982	Nine	Liliana Le Fleur	Broadway, 46th Street Theatre	
1983	Non Pasquale	Norina	Off-Broadway, Delacorte Theatre	
1996	Antigone in New York	Anita	Off-Broadway, Vineyard Theatre	
1999	Babes in Arms	Performer	New York City Center Encores!	
1999	Goodbye, My Friduchita	Frida Kahlo	Off-Broadway, The Directors Company	
1999	The Passion of Frida Kahlo	Frida Kahlo	Off-Broadway, ArcLight Theatre	
2001	Newyorkers	Performer	Off-Broadway, Manhattan Theatre Club	
2001	Roman Holiday	Francesca Cervelli	Regional, The Muny	
2002	Bye Bye Birdie	Rose Alvarez	Regional, Cherry County Playhouse	
2002	Class Mothers '68	Solo Performance	Off-Broadway, Clurman Theatre	
2003	Anna in the Tropics	Ofelia	Broadway, Royale Theatre	
2004	The Oldest Profession	Edna	Off-Broadway, Signature Theatre Company	
2005	Beauty of the Father	Paquita	Off-Broadway, Manhattan Theatre Club	
2008	In the Heights	Camila	Broadway, Richard Rodgers Theatre	
2010	Fanny	Honorine	New York City Center Encores!	
2011	Somewhere	Inez Candelaria	Regional, The Old Globe	
2014	Somewhere	Inez Candelaria	Regional, Hartford Stage	
2014	Pippin	Berthe	Broadway, Music Box Theatre	
2015	Pippin	Berthe	U.S. National Tour	
2016	Bathing in Moonlight	Martina	Regional, McCarter Theatre Center	
2017	The Clean House	Ana	Regional, Williamstown Theatre Festival	
2018	Oklahoma!	Aunt Eller	Regional, Theatre Under the Stars	
2019	Grand Horizons	Carla	Regional, Williamstown Theatre Festival	
2020	Grand Horizons	Carla	Broadway, Hayes Theatre	
2022	The Skin of Our Teeth	Fortune Teller	Broadway, Vivian Beaumont Theatre	
2023	The Gardens of Anuncia	Older Anuncia	Off-Broadway, Lincoln Center Theater	

== Awards and nominations ==
Award	Year	Category	Work	Result	Ref.
1976	Drama League Awards	Special Award, Ensemble	A Chorus Line	Won	
1976	Tony Awards	Best Featured Actress in a Musical	A Chorus Line	Nominated	
1980	Tony Awards	Best Featured Actress in a Musical	A Day in Hollywood / A Night in the Ukraine	Won	
2003	Drama Desk Awards	Outstanding Solo Performance	Class Mother '68	Nominated	
2007	Drama Desk Awards	Outstanding Ensemble Performance	In the Heights	Won	
2024	Lucille Lortel Awards	Outstanding Lead Performer in a Musical	The Gardens of Anuncia	Nominated	

== Personal life ==
Lopez married musician and conductor Vincent Fanuele in 1971. They have two children, Alex and Gabriella.
