= Rapunzel's Tangled Adventure =

American animated television series

- Also known as: Tangled: The Series (season 1)
- Genre: Adventure; Fantasy; Comedy; Musical
- Based on: Tangled by Dan Fogelman
- Developed by: Chris Sonnenburg; Shane Prigmore
- Voices of: Mandy Moore; Zachary Levi; Eden Espinosa; Clancy Brown; Julie Bowen; James Monroe Iglehart; Jeff Ross; Paul F. Tompkins; Jeremy Jordan
- Theme music composer: Gabe Moffat
- Opening theme: "Wind in My Hair" by Mandy Moore
- Ending theme: "More of Me" by Natasha Bedingfield
- Composers: Alan Menken (songs); Kevin Kliesch (score)
- Country of origin: United States
- Original language: English
- No. of seasons: 3
- No. of episodes: 60 (list of episodes)

Production
- Executive producers: Chris Sonnenburg; Benjamin Balistreri (S2–3)
- Producer: Joe Crowley (S3)
- Running time: 22–66 minutes
- Production company: Disney Television Animation

Original release
- Network: Disney Channel
- Release: March 10, 2017 – March 1, 2020

Related
- Tangled; Tangled Ever After

Rapunzel's Tangled Adventure, known as Tangled: The Series in its first season, is an American animated television series developed by Chris Sonnenburg and Shane Prigmore, and produced by Disney Television Animation. It premiered on Disney Channel as a Disney Channel Original Movie titled Tangled: Before Ever After on March 10, 2017. Its regular episodes premiered on March 24, 2017. The series is based on the 2010 film Tangled and features the returning voices of Mandy Moore and Zachary Levi, alongside Eden Espinosa, Clancy Brown, Julie Bowen, James Monroe Iglehart, Jeff Ross, Paul F. Tompkins, and Jeremy Jordan.

In February 2017, ahead of the series premiere, the series was renewed for a second season, which premiered on June 24, 2018. In May 2018, ahead of the premiere of the series' second season, it was announced that the series had been renewed for a third and final season, which premiered on October 7, 2019, and concluded on March 1, 2020.

== Plot ==
Six months after escaping Mother Gothel and reuniting with her birth parents, King Frederic and Queen Arianna of Corona, Princess Rapunzel is unable to properly adjust due to her father's constant protection. When she and her handmaiden Cassandra sneak out of the castle, they come upon some black rock spikes that magically restore Rapunzel's long blonde hair. Rapunzel, Cassandra, Eugene Fitzherbert, Pascal the chameleon, Maximus the horse, and a young alchemist named Varian uncover the mystery of her hair's return and its connection to the black rocks growing around Corona. Eventually, Rapunzel learns that the Sundrop Flower's power resides in her with the black rocks directing her to the Dark Kingdom.

The second season centers around Rapunzel's group traveling to the Dark Kingdom while accompanied by Lance, Hook Foot, and Shorty and joined by the mysterious sword-wielding Adira of the Dark Kingdom. The group soon learn that the rocks are created by the Sundrop's counterpart, the Moonstone Opal. During the journey, Rapunzel gets the chance to explore the world and learns the origins of the Sundrop and Moonstone as two halves of an ancient power seeking to be rejoined. At the end of the season, Cassandra betrays Rapunzel and absorbs the Moonstone's power for herself.

The third and final season involves Rapunzel returning to Corona to act as queen upon finding out that her parents were overthrown, while also dealing with the threat of Cassandra and Zhan Tiri, an ancient demon that plots to use the Moonstone and Sundrop's power to take over and destroy Corona.

== Characters ==
- Rapunzel (Mandy Moore) is the long-lost Princess of Corona who adjusts to her new life as a princess while trying to uncover the mystery of the Black Rocks and her destiny.
- Eugene (Zachary Levi), formerly Flynn Rider, is a reformed thief. He is Rapunzel's boyfriend who finds his place in Corona as a royal guard instructor and later becomes Captain of the Royal Guard. He is later revealed to be the son of King Edmund and the long-lost Prince of the Dark Kingdom.
- Cassandra (Eden Espinosa) is the adopted daughter of the Captain of the Guards. She is Rapunzel's best friend and lady-in-waiting, but over time grows tired of constantly being in Rapunzel's shadow and later learns she is the biological daughter of Mother Gothel herself. She is manipulated by the evil demon Zhan Tiri to turn on Rapunzel by wielding the all-powerful Moonstone before reforming at the end of season 3.
- Pascal and Maximus (Dee Bradley Baker)
  - Pascal is Rapunzel's pet chameleon. His backstory is revealed in Episode 11 "Pascal's Story".
  - Maximus is a white stallion said to have the nose of a bloodhound. He is originally owned by the Captain of the Guard and later by Eugene.
- King Frederic (Clancy Brown) is the King of Corona and Rapunzel's overprotective yet loving father.
- Queen Arianna (Julie Bowen) is the Queen of Corona and Princess Rapunzel's mother.
- Captain of the Guards (M. C. Gainey) is the head of the Corona royal guard and adoptive father of Cassandra. He retired at the end of Season 3.
- Lance Strongbow (James Monroe Iglehart) is Eugene's childhood best friend and former partner-in-crime from his thieving days. He adopts Kiera and Catalina at the end of "Plus Est En Vous".
- Hook Foot (Jeff Ross) is the hook-footed younger brother of Hook Hand. He accompanies Rapunzel on her adventure in Season 2 until "The Brothers Hook" to go on a world tour with his brother.
- Shorty (Paul F. Tompkins) is a crazy drunk who joins Rapunzel and Eugene on their adventures in Season 2.
- Varian (Jeremy Jordan) is a clumsy but smart alchemist who uses his skills to help others. Later on in the series he becomes an antagonist after his father got encased in amber, but reforms in the Season 3 premiere episode "Rapunzel's Return" after his father is freed. At the end of "Plus Est En Vous", he becomes the Royal Engineer and is finally able to give Corona hot water which is something that he wanted to do to in the first episode of season one.
- Angry and Red (Vivian Vencer and Ruby Jay) are a pair of young former thieves who appear as minor characters, later as major characters and revealed that their true names are Kiera and Catalina.
- Quirin (Jonathan Banks) is leader of the small village of Old Corona and Varian's father. Later in the series he got encased as a result of Varian's attempts to destroy the black rocks but was eventually freed in the season three premiere.
- Adira (Kelly Hu) is a mysterious warrior who serves as Rapunzel's guide to the source of the black rocks.
- King Edmund (Bruce Campbell) is King of the Dark Kingdom who keeps the Moonstone Opal from harming the world and is Eugene's long-lost father.
- Hector (Kim Coates) is a dangerous and sadistic member of the Brotherhood. He is the antagonist in the special episode "Rapunzel and the Great Tree".
- Lord Demanitus (Timothy Dalton) is an ancient engineer and inventor who lived in ancient Corona when the Sundrop Flower and Moonstone Opal descended from the heavens.
- Zhan Tiri (Jennifer Veal and Tara Fitzgerald in her demonic form) is an ancient and powerful demon sorceress from another reality who serves as the series' main antagonist. She personally appears in a child-like form to manipulate Cassandra in season 3 after acting through her minions in the first two seasons. She is vanquished in the season 3 finale.

== Episodes ==
Season	Episodes	Originally released	
Season	Episodes	First released	Last released
Film		March 10, 2017	
1	21	March 24, 2017	January 13, 2018
2	21	June 24, 2018	April 14, 2019
3	17	October 7, 2019	March 1, 2020

== Production ==
On June 3, 2015, Disney Channel announced that the series was in development. On February 15, 2017, it was announced that the series had been renewed for a second season ahead of the series premiere. The series features new songs from Alan Menken and Glenn Slater. Menken previously scored the original film, while he and Slater wrote the film's songs.

On May 31, 2018, it was announced that the second season would premiere on June 24, 2018, and that the series had also been renewed for a third season. Additionally, it was also announced that the series would be re-titled Rapunzel's Tangled Adventure.

== Release ==
=== Broadcast ===
On March 10, 2017, Tangled began airing on the Disney Channel. It was titled Tangled: The Series for its first season. On May 21, Tangled began airing on the Disney Channel in Southeast Asia. Then on September 12 of the same year, it began airing on the Disney Channel for Latin America. Also in 2017 it aired as part of the Disney Channel Saturday morning block, then named "Get Animated".

=== Home media ===
Tangled: Before Ever After and the first four Tangled: Short Cuts were released on DVD on April 11, 2017. Tangled: Queen for a Day was released on DVD on December 12, 2017. The entire series was released on Blu-ray on December 28, 2021 as a Disney Movie Club Exclusive.

== Ratings ==
Viewership and ratings per season of Rapunzel's Tangled Adventure
Season	Episodes	First aired		Last aired		Avg. viewers (millions)
Season	Episodes	Date	Viewers (millions)	Date	Viewers (millions)	Avg. viewers (millions)
1	21	March 24, 2017	1.30	January 13, 2018	0.96	1.00
2	21	June 24, 2018	0.67	April 14, 2019	0.35	0.45
3	17	October 7, 2019	0.29	March 1, 2020	0.47	0.31

== Awards and nominations ==
Year	Award	Category	Nominee	Result	Ref.
2017	BMI Film & TV Awards	Cable Television Music Award	Kevin Kliesch and Alan Menken	Won	
2018	Annie Award	Best Animated Television/Broadcast	Episode: "Queen for a Day"	Nominated	
2018	Annie Award	Production for Children	Episode: "Queen for a Day"	Nominated	
2018	Daytime Emmy Awards	Outstanding Individual in Animation	Tom Caulfield	Won	
2018	Daytime Emmy Awards	Outstanding Casting for an Animated Series or Special	Julia Pleasants	Nominated	
2018	Daytime Emmy Awards	Outstanding Casting for an Animated Series or Special	Sara Jane Sherman	Nominated	
2018	Daytime Emmy Awards	Outstanding Music Direction or Composition	Kevin Kliesch	Nominated	
2019	Annie Award	Outstanding Achievement for Character Animation in an Animated Television/Broadcast Production	Juliane Martin (Note: for "King Pascal")	Nominated	
2019	Annie Award	Outstanding Achievement for Character Design in an Animated Television/Broadcast Production	Amanda Jolly (Note: for "Freebird")	Won	
2019	Annie Award	Outstanding Achievement for Music in an Animated Television/Broadcast Production	Alan Menken	Nominated	
2019	Annie Award	Outstanding Achievement for Music in an Animated Television/Broadcast Production	Glenn Slater	Nominated	
2019	Annie Award	Outstanding Achievement for Music in an Animated Television/Broadcast Production	Kevin Kliesch	Nominated	
2019	Daytime Emmy Awards	Outstanding Casting for an Animated Series or Special	Julia Pleasants	Nominated	
2019	Daytime Emmy Awards	Outstanding Casting for an Animated Series or Special	Sara Jane Sherman	Nominated	
2019	Daytime Emmy Awards	Outstanding Individual Achievement in Animation	production design and background design	Tied	
2020	Annie Award	Best Production Design in TV/Media (Note: for "Rapunzel and The Great Tree")	Alan Bodner	Nominated	
2020	Annie Award	Best Production Design in TV/Media	Brian Woods	Nominated	
2020	Annie Award	Best Production Design in TV/Media	Steven Nicodemus	Nominated	
2020	Annie Award	Best Production Design in TV/Media	Laura Price	Nominated	
2020	Annie Award	Best Production Design in TV/Media	Leonard Robledo	Nominated	
2020	Annie Award	Best Character Animation in TV/Media	Juliane Martin (Note: for "Rapunzel and The Great Tree")	Nominated	
2020	Daytime Emmy Awards	Outstanding Writing for an Animated Program	Jase Ricci	Won	
2020	Daytime Emmy Awards	Outstanding Writing for an Animated Program	Ricky Roxburgh	Won	
2020	Daytime Emmy Awards	Outstanding Directing for an Animated Program	Tom Caulfield	Nominated	
2020	Daytime Emmy Awards	Outstanding Directing for an Animated Program	Shane Zalvin	Nominated	
2020	Daytime Emmy Awards	Outstanding Directing for an Animated Program	Mary Elizabeth McGlynn	Nominated	
2020	Daytime Emmy Awards	Outstanding Music Direction and Composition	Kevin Kliesch	Nominated	
2020	Daytime Emmy Awards	Outstanding Original Song in a Children's, Young Adult or Animated Program (Note: for Rapunzel and the Great Tree: "Waiting in the Wings")	Alan Menken	Won	
2020	Daytime Emmy Awards	Outstanding Original Song in a Children's, Young Adult or Animated Program	Glenn Slater	Won	
2020	Daytime Emmy Awards	Outstanding Casting for an Animated Series or Special	Julia Pleasants	Nominated	
2020	Daytime Emmy Awards	Outstanding Casting for an Animated Series or Special	David H. Wright III	Nominated	
2020	Daytime Emmy Awards	Outstanding Casting for an Animated Series or Special	Sara Jane Sherman	Nominated	
2020	Daytime Emmy Awards	Outstanding Main Title for an Animated Program	Chris Sonnenburg	Won	
2020	Daytime Emmy Awards	Outstanding Main Title for an Animated Program	Bryan Deemer	Won	
2020	Daytime Emmy Awards	Outstanding Main Title for an Animated Program	Jezreel Carlos	Won	
2020	Daytime Emmy Awards	Outstanding Main Title for an Animated Program	Claire Keane	Won	
2020	Daytime Emmy Awards	Outstanding Editing for an Animated Program	Tony Rocco	Nominated	
2020	Daytime Emmy Awards	Outstanding Editing for an Animated Program	Kevin Locarro	Nominated	
2020	Daytime Emmy Awards	Outstanding Editing for an Animated Program	John Royer	Nominated	
2020	Daytime Emmy Awards	Outstanding Editing for an Animated Program	Louis Russell	Nominated	
2021	Daytime Emmy Awards	OUTSTANDING ORIGINAL SONG FOR A PRESCHOOL, CHILDREN’S OR ANIMATED PROGRAM (Note: for "Nothing Left to Lose")	Alan Menken	Nominated	
2021	Daytime Emmy Awards	OUTSTANDING ORIGINAL SONG FOR A PRESCHOOL, CHILDREN’S OR ANIMATED PROGRAM	Glenn Slater	Nominated	

== Reception ==
Reviews of the series were relatively positive. Klaudia Amenábar of The Mary Sue argues that the show has "relatable themes" for Millennials and those in Generation Z, with focus on emotional abuse, trauma, friendship, and creating relationships. Amenábar also argued that Eugene represents "healthy and supportive masculinity", and described the series as a Millennial sitcom which parses out "uniquely adult issues for kids". Emily Ashby of Common Sense Media focused on the appeal of the series to kids and families, argued that there was romantic chemistry between Rapunzel and Eugene, prevalence of frightening moments, and argued that younger kids may not have "the attention span to see it through," while praising the fun character adventures. Furthermore, she stated that series is episodic, better suited "for a slightly older audience" and is good "family fare." Ian Goodwillie of CBR criticized the series for being aimed at kids, while deviating from the fairy tale, having an overbearing king, classic good vs. evil conflict, differing "from the animated movie it's based on", and having an evil demon antagonist that didn't fit with the tone. Goodwillie also praised that the actors who voiced Eugene and Rapunzel, said that the series is fun, and has an interesting story. James Whitbrook of Gizmodo wrote that that the soundtrack "is just jam-packed with some killer tunes that would be highlights of any Disney movie, let alone getting to exist as a regular occurrence on a Disney Channel kid's show".
