= George Abud =

Lebanese-American theatre actor (born 1990)

- Abud in 2019
- Born: October 30, 1990 (age 35); Detroit, Michigan, United States
- Education: Wayne State University
- Occupations: Actor; playwright; director
- Years active: 2012–present
- Website: www.georgeabud.com

George Abud (born October 30, 1990) is a Lebanese-American actor, playwright, and director. He is known for playing Filippo Marinetti in the Broadway musical Lempicka, as well as Camal in the Off-Broadway and Broadway productions of The Band's Visit, receiving a Daytime Emmy Award for his work on the show's NBC Today Show performance.

== Early life and education ==
Abud was born in Detroit to Lebanese-American parents Gary and Paulette Abud. He attended Wayne State University and graduated with a Bachelor of Fine Arts in theatre acting before moving to New York City in 2012.

== Career ==
Abud first appeared in New York in the 2014 revival of Rodgers and Hammerstein's Allegro directed by John Doyle at Classic Stage Company. His adaptation of "Children and Art" from Sunday in the Park with George was selected to be played live at New York City Center for Stephen Sondheim. Jeanine Tesori recounted:

"Finally, George Abud sang his rendition of "Children and Art," gently accompanying himself on the Oud, his version exploring his own relationship to his father. Tears streamed down Steve's face. He ended up staying to see the performance of Tick, Tick...Boom! that night after all, his heart clearly broken, but also full."

Abud made his Broadway debut in 2015 in John Kander and Fred Ebb's final musical, The Visit, starring Chita Rivera and Roger Rees.

Later, he originated the role of Camal in the Off-Broadway and subsequent Broadway production of The Band's Visit. Zachary Stewart of TheaterMania wrote: "Playing the role of violinist Camal, George Abud consistently wows with both his comic timing and musical virtuosity. His voice gloriously rings through the theater in Itzik's Lullaby, during which he plays an oud." After leaving The Band's Visit in late 2018, Abud was cast in the Off-Broadway production of Bertolt Brecht's The Resistible Rise of Arturo Ui starring Raúl Esparza at Classic Stage Company. Sara Holdren of Vulture noted: "George Abud is a nimble, fast-talking delight...".

In 2019, Abud portrayed Lewis Chapman in the musical version of August Rush directed by John Doyle at the Paramount Theatre in Aurora, Illinois. Next, he was cast in Annie Get Your Gun directed by Sarna Lapine at Bay Street Theater in Sag Harbor, New York.

In 2020, he starred as Nerd Face in the new pop musical Emojiland, Off-Broadway at the Duke on 42nd Street, about which Laura Collins-Hughes of The New York Times said: "But with the arrival of Nerd Face, played with wonderfully sweet dorkiness by George Abud, you can feel the air turn electric. There is a very good chance that you will be as instantly smitten with him as he is with Smize (Schein) in her polka-dotted fit-and-flare dress." For his performance, Abud was nominated for the Drama Desk Award for Outstanding Featured Actor in a Musical.

It was announced in May 2022 that Abud would star as Italian Futurist Filippo Marinetti in the new musical Lempicka by Carson Kreitzer and Matt Gould at La Jolla Playhouse, directed by Rachel Chavkin. The San Diego Union Tribune wrote: "George Abud is another ideal hand-in-glove fit for the role of Italian pro-fascist modernist Filippo Marinetti. His edgy performance of the high-flying song 'Perfection' is one of those moments in a show where thoughts of future Tony nominations dance in the head — for him, as well as for Espinosa and Iman."

Abud returned Off-Broadway, in early 2023, in the world premiere musical Cornelia Street at the Atlantic Theater Company, opposite Norbert Leo Butz. That spring he returned to Birdland Jazz Club, with duo partner Katrina Lenk, in an encore performance of Abud & Lenk: Swung.

Following that, Abud portrayed Russian lyric poet Aleksandr Blok in the New York debut of Elizabeth Swados's The Beautiful Lady directed by Anne Bogart at La MaMa Experimental Theatre Club. Of his performance, TheaterMania stated: "Abud's readings of Blok's poetry are particularly haunting: a persistent, slightly erotic cadence to his voice, his eyes heavy with the weight of too much seen."

In 2024, Abud returned to Broadway in the original musical Lempicka, reprising his starring role as Marinetti. In his review for The New York Times, chief theater critic Jesse Green singled out Abud's performance as "excellent".

It was confirmed in late 2024 that Abud would play Duane in the star-studded crime thriller film Caught Stealing directed by Darren Aronofsky, and starring Austin Butler, Zoë Kravitz and Regina King.

It was announced that Abud's original play with music, The Ruins, would receive its world premiere in September 2025 at the Guthrie Theater in Minneapolis, Minnesota. According to Playbill, "the work sees two young people entering a single room with a stringed instrument, sharing their rage and ecstasy over eight movements as they explore how music can express the language that words fail to convey." He also stars in the production, along with Sydney Shepherd, which re-opens the Guthrie's third theatre, Dowling Studio.

== Stage credits ==
=== Theatre ===
Year	Production	Role	Location	Category
2012	Oliver Twist	Toby Crackit	Shakespeare Theatre of New Jersey	Regional
2012	Man of La Mancha	José, a Muleteer	Shakespeare Theatre of New Jersey	Regional
2013	A Midsummer Night's Dream	Puck	Geva Theatre Center	Regional
2013	Fiddler on the Roof	The Fiddler	Loft Theatre, Human Race Theatre Company	Regional
2014	Allegro	Charlie Townsend	Classic Stage Company	Off-Broadway
2015	The Visit	Karl Schell	Lyceum Theatre	Broadway
2015	Nathan the Wise	Al-Hafi	Classic Stage Company	Off-Broadway
2016	Peer Gynt	The Bridegroom	Classic Stage Company	Off-Broadway
2016	The Band's Visit	Camal	Atlantic Theater Company	Off-Broadway
2017–2019	The Band's Visit	Camal	Ethel Barrymore Theatre	Broadway
2018	The Resistible Rise of Arturo Ui	Clark, Ted Ragg	Classic Stage Company	Off-Broadway
2019	Lolita, My Love	Clare Quilty	York Theatre Company	Off-Broadway
2019	August Rush	Lewis Chapman	Paramount Theatre (Aurora, Illinois)	Regional
2019	1776	James Wilson	The Muny	Regional
2019	Annie Get Your Gun	Charlie Davenport	Bay Street Theater	Regional
2020	Emojiland	Nerd Face	The Duke on 42nd Street	Off-Broadway
2021	Ebenezer Scrooge's BIG San Diego Christmas Show	Fred, Young Scrooge	Old Globe Theater	Regional
2022	Lempicka	Filippo Marinetti	La Jolla Playhouse	Regional
2023	Cornelia Street	William	Atlantic Theater Company	Off-Broadway
2023	The Beautiful Lady	Aleksandr Blok	La MaMa Experimental Theatre Club	Off-Broadway
2023	The Untitled Unauthorized Hunter S. Thompson Musical	Nixon	La Jolla Playhouse	Regional
2024	Lempicka	Filippo Marinetti	Longacre Theatre	Broadway
2024	Anything Goes	Lord Evelyn Oakleigh	The Muny	Regional
2025	Queen of the Mist	Frank Russell	PEAK Performances	Regional
2025	The Untitled Unauthorized Hunter S. Thompson Musical	Nixon	Signature Theatre	Regional
2025	The Ruins	1	Guthrie Theater	Regional
2025	A Christmas Carol	Nephew Fred	Perelman Performing Arts Center	Off-Broadway
2026	3Penny Opera	Macheath	The Theatre at St. Jean's	Off-Broadway

== Filmography ==
=== Film ===
Year	Title	Role	Notes
2025	Caught Stealing	Duane	

== Awards and nominations ==
Year	Award	Category	Role	Show	Result	Ref
2019	Daytime Emmy Award	Outstanding Musical Performance in a Daytime Program (with the cast of The Band's Visit)	Camal	The Band's Visit	Won	
2020	Drama Desk Award	Outstanding Featured Actor in a Musical	Nerd Face	Emojiland	Nominated	
2023	Craig Noel Award	Outstanding Featured Performance in a Musical	Filippo Marinetti	Lempicka	Nominated	
2024	Craig Noel Award	Outstanding Featured Performance in a Musical	Nixon	The Untitled Unauthorized Hunter S. Thompson Musical	Won	
2026	Helen Hayes Award	Outstanding Supporting Performer in a Musical	Nixon	The Untitled Unauthorized Hunter S. Thompson Musical	Won	
