= The Gardens of Anuncia =

Musical based on the 1950 film of the same name

- Music: Michael John LaChiusa
- Lyrics: Michael John LaChiusa
- Book: Michael John LaChiusa
- Basis: The life of Graciela Daniele
- Productions: 2021 San Diego; 2023 Off-Broadway

The Gardens of Anuncia is a stage musical with music, lyrics, and a book by Michael John LaChiusa. The show is based on the life of Graciela Daniele, a prolific figure in modern musical theatre. Daniele was born and raised in Buenos Aires, Argentina, where the show is set. It follows her life from a young girl in Argentina during the years of Juan Perón, and her journey that lead her to New York City and eventually becoming an acclaimed dancer, choreographer, and director.

== Production history ==
=== Old Globe (2021) ===
The musical premiered at the Old Globe Theatre in San Diego on September 10, 2021, running until October 17, 2021. Daniele served as director and co-choreographer for the production alongside Alex Sanchez. The show, commissioned by the Old Globe, had been in development for several years, with Daniele telling her life story to LaChiusa and creating the work together. Daniele said she wanted to honor the women in her life that helped her get to where she is today, she also looked forward to creating the new piece as she nears retirement. Orchestrations for the show were done by Michael Starobin with musical direction by Deborah Abramson.

=== Off-Broadway (2023) ===
The musical was next performed Off-Broadway at the Mitzi E, Newhouse Theatre within Lincoln Center, running from October 19, 2023 until December 31, 2023.

== Original cast and characters ==
Character	Old Globe	Lincoln Center
Character	2021	2023
Anuncia (older)	Priscilla Lopez	Priscilla Lopez
Anuncia (younger)	Kalyn West	Kalyn West
Carmen, her mother	Eden Espinosa	Eden Espinosa
Magdalena, her grandmama	Mary Testa	Mary Testa
Aunt Lucia	Andréa Burns	Andréa Burns
Granpapa/Various	Enrique Acevedo	Enrique Acevedo
The Deer/Various	Tally Sessions	Tally Sessions

== Musical numbers ==
- "Opening" - Company
- "Mami Said" - Mami, Older Anuncia
- "Listen to the Music" - Tia, Young Anuncia
- "Waiting/Dreaming" - Granmama, Granpapa
- "Dance While You Can" - The Deer, Older Anuncia
- "Malagueña" - Mami
- "The Annunciation" - Tia, Mami, Granmama
- "Smile for Me, Lucia" - Tia, Moustache Brothers
- "The Vigil" - Company
- "Dance While You Can (reprise)" - Jane, Joe, Phil
- "Travel" - Grandfather, Young Anuncia
- "Miss the Man" - Granmama
- "The Trial" - Company
- "Listen to the Music (reprise)" - Older Anuncia, Younger Anuncia
- "Never a Goodbye" - Tia
- "Finale" - Company

An original cast recording will be released.

== Awards and nominations ==
Year	Award	Category	Nominee	Result	Ref.
2024	Drama League Awards	Distinguished Performance	Eden Espinosa	Pending	
2024	Lucille Lortel Award	Outstanding Lead Performer in a Musical	Priscilla Lopez	Pending	
2024	Lucille Lortel Award	Outstanding Choreographer	Graciela Daniele & Alex Sanchez	Pending	
