= Selenkay =

- Genre: Fantasy; Mystery; Suspense
- Directed by: Martín Sabban; Joaquín Cambre; Eduardo Pinto
- Country of origin: Argentina
- Original language: Spanish
- No. of seasons: 2
- No. of episodes: 16

Production
- Production locations: Bariloche; Río Negro Province; Buenos Aires
- Cinematography: Alejandra Martín
- Running time: 40 minutes
- Production company: Metrovisión Producciones

Original release
- Network: Disney+ Disney Channel Latin America
- Release: 17 August 2024 – present

Selenkay is an Argentine mystery-fantasy television series for children and adolescents, which is produced by Metrovisión Producciones for the Walt Disney Company. The first season with eight episodes was released on August 21, 2024, on Disney+ and the first episode was released on August 17 on the Disney Channel. In October 2024, the series had been renewed for a second season, which aired on Disney Channel from April 4 to April 25, 2025.

== Plot ==
16-year-old Sofía Rivera had to move constantly because of her parents' work and live in the most remote places. Sofía longs for stability in life and finally wants to build long-term friendships and relationships. This wish seems to come true when the family moves to the small mountain village of Río Vivo. But when Sofía discovers a supernatural power that is connected to water, her dreams vanish into thin air. At the same time, the controversial and mysterious Fénix siblings arrive in the village and attract the attention of all residents, including Sofías. Sofía quickly develops a deep connection with Gael, the middle brother, to whom Sofía feels drawn. Her family is against this relationship because they don't trust Gael and his siblings. As Sofía deepens her relationship with Gael, she begins to decipher all mysterious and supernatural events and learns more about herself in the process. Her discoveries ultimately lead Sofía to question her previous understanding of the world.

== Cast ==
- Gina Mastronicola as Sofía Rivera
- Manuel Ramos as Gael Fénix
- Mónica Antonópulos as Aurora
- Carolina Kopelioff as Emilia Frank
- Alejandro Paker as Pedro Rivera
- María Zubiri as Iris Rivera
- Julián Caballero as Lupo Rivera
- Luisina Arito as Flox Rivera
- Valentín Villafañe as Rafael Fénix
- Francisco Vázquez as Micael Fénix
- Nahuel Pirovano as Tacu Adek
- Thais Rippel as Diana Alves
- Charo Bogarín as Navera Adek
- Joaquín Berthold as Patrick Robinson
- Gustavo Masó as Intendente Frank
- Mario Alarcón as Lucio
- Lucía Tuero as Vicky
- Candela Arregui as Alexia

== Episodes ==
=== Season 1 (2024) ===
No. overall	No. in season	Title	Directed by	Written by	Original release date
1	1	"Bienvenidos a Rio Vivo" "Welcome to Rio Vivo"	Martín Sabban Joaquín Cambre Eduardo Pinto	Susana Cardozo, Shane Gotcher, Pablo Lago, Gina Mastronicola, Manuel Ramos, and Alejandro Paker	17 August 2024
2	2	"Rara" "Weird"	Martín Sabban Joaquín Cambre Eduardo Pinto	Susana Cardozo, Shane Gotcher, Pablo Lago, Gina Mastronicola, Manuel Ramos, and Alejandro Paker	18 August 2024
3	3	"Bajo presión" "Under Pressure"	Martín Sabban Joaquín Cambre Eduardo Pinto	Susana Cardozo, Shane Gotcher, Pablo Lago, Gina Mastronicola, Manuel Ramos, and Alejandro Paker	24 August 2024
4	4	"Fénix"	Martín Sabban Joaquín Cambre Eduardo Pinto	Susana Cardozo, Shane Gotcher, Pablo Lago, Gina Mastronicola, Manuel Ramos, and Alejandro Paker	25 August 2024
5	5	"Despertar" "Awakening"	Martín Sabban Joaquín Cambre Eduardo Pinto	Susana Cardozo, Shane Gotcher, Pablo Lago, Gina Mastronicola, Manuel Ramos, and Alejandro Paker	31 August 2024
6	6	"Iniciacion" "Indication"	Martín Sabban Joaquín Cambre Eduardo Pinto	Susana Cardozo, Shane Gotcher, Pablo Lago, Gina Mastronicola, Manuel Ramos, and Alejandro Paker	1 September 2024
7	7	"Identidad" "Identity"	Martín Sabban Joaquín Cambre Eduardo Pinto	Susana Cardozo, Shane Gotcher, Pablo Lago, Gina Mastronicola, Manuel Ramos, and Alejandro Paker	7 September 2024
8	8	"Aurora"	Martín Sabban Joaquín Cambre Eduardo Pinto	Susana Cardozo, Shane Gotcher, Pablo Lago, Gina Mastronicola, Manuel Ramos, and Alejandro Paker	8 September 2024

=== Season 2 (2025) ===
No. overall	No. in season	Title	Directed by	Written by	Original release date
9	1	"Eclipse"	Martín Sabban Joaquín Cambre Eduardo Pinto	Susana Cardozo, Shane Gotcher, Pablo Lago, Gina Mastronicola, Manuel Ramos, and Alejandro Paker	4 April 2025
10	2	"¡Bienvenida, Alexia!" "Welcome, Alexia!"	Martín Sabban Joaquín Cambre Eduardo Pinto	Susana Cardozo, Shane Gotcher, Pablo Lago, Gina Mastronicola, Manuel Ramos, and Alejandro Paker	4 April 2025
11	3	"La marcha de los rebeldes" "The Rebels March"	Martín Sabban Joaquín Cambre Eduardo Pinto	Susana Cardozo, Shane Gotcher, Pablo Lago, Gina Mastronicola, Manuel Ramos, and Alejandro Paker	11 April 2025
12	4	"Adivina quien viene a cenar" "Guess Who's Coming for Dinner"	Martín Sabban Joaquín Cambre Eduardo Pinto	Susana Cardozo, Shane Gotcher, Pablo Lago, Gina Mastronicola, Manuel Ramos, and Alejandro Paker	11 April 2025
13	5	"No juegues con fuego.." "Don't Play with Fire..."	Martín Sabban Joaquín Cambre Eduardo Pinto	Susana Cardozo, Shane Gotcher, Pablo Lago, Gina Mastronicola, Manuel Ramos, and Alejandro Paker	18 April 2025
14	6	"...porque te vas a quemar" "...For You Will Get Burnt"	Martín Sabban Joaquín Cambre Eduardo Pinto	Susana Cardozo, Shane Gotcher, Pablo Lago, Gina Mastronicola, Manuel Ramos, and Alejandro Paker	18 April 2025
15	7	"Verdad o consecuencia" "Truth or Consequence"	Martín Sabban Joaquín Cambre Eduardo Pinto	Susana Cardozo, Shane Gotcher, Pablo Lago, Gina Mastronicola, Manuel Ramos, and Alejandro Paker	25 April 2025
16	8	"Klamad"	Martín Sabban Joaquín Cambre Eduardo Pinto	Susana Cardozo, Shane Gotcher, Pablo Lago, Gina Mastronicola, Manuel Ramos, and Alejandro Paker	25 April 2025
