= Eden Espinosa =

American actress and singer (born 1978)

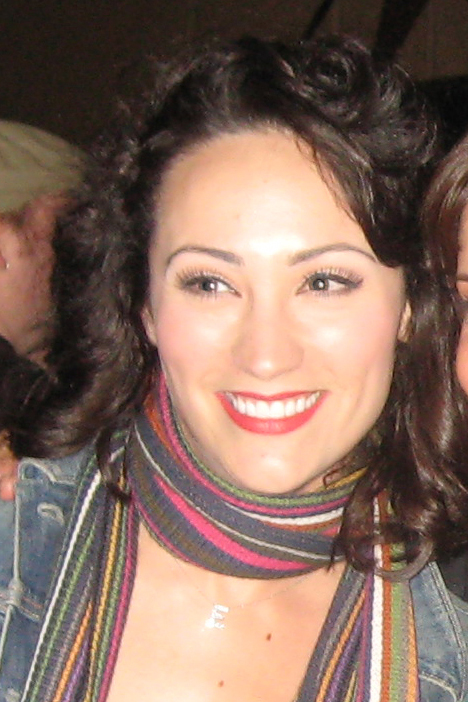
- Espinosa in May 2008
- Born: Eden Erica Espinosa; February 2, 1978 (age 48); Anaheim, California, U.S.
- Occupations: Actress; singer
- Years active: 2000–present
- Spouse: Joseph Abate (m. 2010; div. 2019)
- Website: edenespinosa.com

Eden Erica Espinosa (born February 2, 1978) is an American actress and singer who is best known for her performances as Elphaba for the Broadway, Los Angeles, and San Francisco productions of the musical Wicked. In 2022, she was nominated for an Emmy Award for her role as the Queen of Hearts in Alice's Wonderland Bakery. In 2024, Espinosa received a nomination for the Tony Award for Best Actress in a Musical for her performance in Lempicka.

== Education and early career ==
Espinosa was born in Anaheim, California, of Mexican descent. She began singing at the age of three, performing at age five, and recording at the age of ten. At Canyon High School, she played the role of Maria in West Side Story. After graduating, Espinosa worked at local theme parks such as Disneyland and Universal Studios. She was also part of the successful performing group The Young Americans, which is based in Southern California and performs in front of audiences worldwide. In 2026, Espinosa said, in an interview, that voiceover had been a dream of hers since she "saw ‘Little Mermaid’ when I was I think 10."

== Career ==
=== Wicked ===
Espinosa made her Broadway debut as a member of the original Broadway cast of Stephen Schwartz's musical Wicked, which opened on October 30, 2003. She started the production as standby for Idina Menzel in the role of Elphaba. She was also an understudy for the role of Nessarose. Espinosa performed the role of Elphaba for a month continuously during the summer of 2004, while Menzel was filming Ask the Dust. Espinosa left Wicked on September 5, 2004, to originate the lead for the Broadway debut of Brooklyn.

Following the closing of Brooklyn the Musical, Espinosa performed the lead role of Elphaba for the Wicked First National tour during the entire San Francisco run, from August 5 to September 11, 2005. She replaced Stephanie J. Block while Block recovered from an injury.

On January 10, 2006, Espinosa returned to perform in the lead role of Elphaba for the Broadway production of Wicked, taking over the role from Shoshana Bean. Espinosa performed for the Wicked celebration of its 1,000th performance on Broadway, on March 21, 2006. She left the Broadway production on October 8, 2006, and was replaced by Ana Gasteyer.

Espinosa received the 2006 Broadway.com Audience Award for "Favorite Female Replacement", in recognition of her performances as Elphaba during her Broadway run as lead.

Espinosa originated the role of Elphaba for the third U.S. production of Wicked in Los Angeles, which opened on February 21, 2007, playing the role until December 30, 2007. She received broad critical acclaim for the role. She returned on October 31, 2008 and stayed with the production until its closing night on January 11, 2009. On March 2, 2010 until June 26, 2010, Espinosa played Elphaba in the San Francisco production of Wicked. This was the last time Espinosa ever played Elphaba. She was later described by the LA Times as "best known" for this role.

=== Brooklyn the Musical ===
Espinosa originated and workshopped the title role in Brooklyn the Musical over the course of two years. Its world premiere was on April 30, 2003 (previews), and it ran until June 15, 2003, at the Denver Civic Center.

Espinosa opened in Brooklyn on Broadway at the Plymouth Theatre on October 21, 2004, and stayed with the musical until it closed on June 26, 2005. It played 27 previews and 284 regular performances.

Espinosa was nominated for a 2005 Drama League Award for Distinguished Performance for her performance. She was featured on the original Broadway cast recording of Brooklyn the Musical.

=== Rent ===
On May 30, 2008, Espinosa joined the Broadway cast of Rent at the Nederlander Theatre and stayed with the production until it closed on September 7, 2008. Espinosa made appearances on Good Morning America and at the 2008 Tony Awards (which featured the original and closing Broadway casts). She also featured in the filmed final Broadway performance.

Espinosa returned to the Richard Rodgers Theatre for a one night showing where she played Maureen for the 30th Anniversary of RENT, along with Idina Menzel and Nicolette Hart also playing the role. All funds made by the show were donated to Broadway Cares / Equity fights AIDS. The show was also live-streamed that night and was available for the next 24 hours from October 26th to the 27th.

=== Additional theatre ===
Espinosa starred in a production of Flora the Red Menace which ran at UCLA's Freud Playhouse from May 6–18, 2008. After its closing, on September 21, 2008, Espinosa made her West End debut in "Never Neverland", a benefit concert that raised money for British charities Ovarian Cancer Action and NCH. The concert took place at the Duchess Theatre in London.

Espinosa performed as Miranda in the one-night staging of Howard Ashman's previously unproduced musical Dreamstuff on June 23, 2008, at the Hayworth Theatre in Los Angeles, directed by Michael Urie.

Espinosa played the Fairy Godmother in the 2011 Nashville Symphony Orchestra concert version of Cinderella on April 15, 2011, alongside Wicked alum Alli Mauzey, who played the title character.

She headlined the world premiere of the new musical Rain by Michael John LaChiusa as Sadie, at the Old Globe Theatre in San Diego from March 24 to May 1, 2016. In 2017, she played Mary in Merrily We Roll Along at Huntington Theatre Company.

Espinosa played the lead role in Studio Tenn's production of Evita in Nashville, Tennessee, from September 9 to 18, 2016.

In 2018, Espinosa played the role of Daniella in the concert version of Lin-Manuel Miranda's In the Heights.

For an entire year, Espinosa starred as Trina in the 2019 National tour of Falsettos.

On February 17, 2020, Espinosa appeared as one of The Narrators in the 50th Anniversary concert of Joseph and the Amazing Technicolor Dreamcoat at Lincoln Center.

Espinosa starred in The Gardens of Anuncia, a musical by Michael John LaChiusa about the life of Graciela Daniele, portraying her mother.

Espinosa starred as the titular character in Lempicka at the Williamstown Theatre Festival in 2018 and later the La Jolla Playhouse from 2019 to 2020. The musical transferred to Broadway's Longacre Theatre in 2024. For her performance, Espinosa received a nomination for the Tony Award for Best Actress in a Musical.

Espinosa was also featured on the Concord Theater's concept album of 17 Again, her voice credited on It's Time for Starting Over, Make Most of Tonight, Love You Till Forever, and 17 Again / #brandnewday in 2023. A music video was also released for It's Time For Starting Over.

On August 8th, 2026, Espinosa played the role of Beatrice in the Old Globe Theater's production of the Shakespeare play, Much Ado About Nothing. The show ran for the month of August, before closing on August 30th.

=== Solo shows/performances ===
On October 22, 2005, Espinosa made her solo concert debut with a co-headlining show with Tony Award nominee Euan Morton at Town Hall in New York City part of the venue's Cabaret Festival.

In March 2009, Espinosa performed her solo show entitled "Me" at Joe's Pub in New York City, directed by Billy Porter. She returned to Southern California with her show on Friday, July 24, 2009, at the John Anson Ford Amphitheatre.

In December 2009, she performed a 2nd solo show entitled "From Eden With Love" at the Razz Room at Hotel Nikko in San Francisco, CA.

In September 2012, Espinosa became one of the first few major lineup acts opening Feinstein's/54 Below with a themed show paying tribute to the acclaimed singer-songwriter Eva Cassidy.

She was featured as a soloist for Disneyland's new firework spectacular "Magical" premiering in the summer of 2009, where she sang Magical's theme song as well as Disney songs such as "Baby Mine".

In February 2020, Espinosa launched a new acoustic solo show at The Green Room 42 entitled Unplugged & Unplanned. Every concert, the show's setlist would be all new. The February shows were sold out; it included an extension that led into March 2020. However, the final two shows were cancelled due to the COVID-19 pandemic. When live performances started to resume during the spring of 2021, Espinosa returned and completed the last two shows of the residency.

Today, many of the Espinosa's concerts are done in the style inspired by her Unplugged & Unplanned show rotating the setlist of tunes from her Broadway career, both her solo albums, pop/rock covers, and a Musical Theater fan request section. On August 8, 2021, she headlined her first solo concert on the Las Vegas Strip at The Space Las Vegas. For fans who weren't able to make it, the concert was also livestreamed. On November 13, 2021, Espinosa performed a one night only concert in Holmdel, NJ at the Holmdel Theatre Company (part of the Broadway at the Barn series).

Espinosa brought her concert overseas to London at Cadogan Hall on April 8, 2022.

=== Solo albums ===
In August 2012, Espinosa announced she was in the process of recording her debut solo album, featuring modern Broadway hits with a pop sensibility, entitled Look Around. The album was released on December 18, 2012, debuting at #41 on the iTunes Pop Charts. The album also went on to win multiple awards for independent artists including the Independent Music Awards for Pop Album of the Year, Female Pop Vocalist of the Year, and Producer of the Year (which went to Espinosa's producer, Joseph Abate).

On July 25, 2015, Espinosa announced she was in the early development process of her sophomore studio album. Just like with Look Around, she started a Kickstarter fundraiser to raise money for the album. The album recordings and release were delayed due to Espinosa's schedule with various theater projects, voiceover work, concerts, and personal situations that ended up inspiring the album of original songs. The sophomore album, entitled "Revelation", was officially released on January 23, 2019. It debuted at #15 on the Pop iTunes charts.

=== Television ===
Espinosa has appeared on various television shows, including Law & Order, Robot Chicken, and Dog Whisperer. She had a recurring role in 2009 as the voice of Sasha Caylo on the super robot animated series Titan Maximum, an original show developed for Adult Swim.

In 2007, the ABC series Ugly Betty included performances of "I'm Not That Girl" and "Defying Gravity" in the episode "Something Wicked This Way Comes", featuring Espinosa and other members of Los Angeles Wicked cast.

She has also appeared on the Today Show in 2004, the Macy's Thanksgiving Day Parade TV broadcast in 2004, The Tonight Show with Jay Leno in 2007, and as a performer on the 2008 Tony Awards.

In 2011, she appeared on the animated sketch comedy series Mad episode "Force Code / Flammable" as Katy Putty, a Katy Perry parody made out of Play-Doh who sings about flammability, and performed "Flammable", a spoof on Perry's song "Firework".

In 2016, she voiced Orizaba the moth fairy in the tenth episode of Elena of Avalor, "The Sceptre of Light", and again in 2018 for season two episode 18, "Finding Zuzo".

She voiced Rapunzel’s handmaiden and confidant Cassandra in the 2017 film Tangled: Before Ever After and in Tangled: The Series/Rapunzel's Tangled Adventure. For the show, she sang the lead vocals for the song "Waiting in the Wings", composed by Alan Menken and Glenn Slater, which won the 2020 Daytime Emmy Award for Outstanding Original Song in a Children's, Young Adult or Animated Program.

In 2022, she voiced The Queen Of Hearts in Disney Junior's Alice's Wonderland Bakery.

She sang vocals in the musical number titled "TRUCKS" in the episode of the same name of Cars on the Road.

In 2026, it was announced that she was voicing the villain Zandrya in Sofia the First: Royal Magic. She told the Los Angeles Times that the character is "loud, bratty, confident and powerful," and a bit misunderstood, while saying it was "the most fun character to play." Series creator Craig Gerber said he wanted the character to act entitled, as if all magic should be "given to her and she shouldn’t even really have to work for it". The LA Times said the character will take a different form and new voice in each episode, using disguises to get her hands on the magic amulet, with the character singing during musical numbers.

On October 22nd, 23rd, and 24th, Espinosa was part of the Garry Marshall Theater's Halloween Squares event.

=== Game Night ===
During the COVID-19 pandemic, Espinosa along with real life best friend vocalist and Rent alumna Kamilah Marshall collaborated with California based Regional house Musical Theatre West creating a weekly web series on Instagram Live entitled Game Night with Eden & Kamilah. The series featured the duo in a friendly competition playing a series of Musical Theatre themed trivia games. The series would go Live every Thursday night on Instagram. However, the plug got pulled from them doing the lives due to the change of restrictions of use of music on the lives on social media. They later moved it to being an interactive show on Zoom featuring fans playing along. Most recently, Game Night was then changed to a real live studio game show featuring both Espinosa and Marshall hosting with special Broadway guests. It was released on Broadstream on November 3, 2021. The game show returned for two nights only at the Garry Marshall Theater in Burbank, CA for September 17th and 18th.

== Personal life ==
Eden married managing producer Joseph Abate on October 16, 2010. They divorced in 2019.

== Filmography ==
Film & Television
Year	Title	Role	Notes
2006	Law & Order	Mia Alvarez	TV series; Episode: "Deadlock"
2007	Ugly Betty	Elphaba	TV series; Episode: "Something Wicked This Way Comes"
2007–2022	Robot Chicken	Various roles (voice)	TV series; 18 episodes
2008	Dog Whisperer	Herself	TV series; Episode: "Owen, Jerry and Rocky"
2008	Rent: Filmed Live on Broadway	Maureen Johnson	TV film
2009	Titan Maximum	Lt. Sasha Caylo / Female Fightercraft Pilot (voice)	TV series; recurring role
2010	Chico's Angels	Moca	TV series; Episode: "Gang of Chicas"
2010	Robot Chicken: Star Wars Episode III	Princess Leia / Mon Mothma (voice)	TV film
2011–2013	Mad	Various roles (voice)	TV series; 2 episodes
2016–2020	Elena of Avalor	Orizaba (voice)	TV series; 3 episodes
2017	Tangled: Before Ever After	Cassandra (voice)	TV film
2017–2020	Rapunzel's Tangled Adventure	Cassandra (voice)	TV series; main role
2018	Tangled Short Cuts	Cassandra (voice)	TV miniseries: Episode: "Hiccup Fever"
2018	Elementary	Doctor	TV series; Episode: "Fit to Be Tired"
2018	The Storyteller	Carol	Film
2022	Cars on the Road	Truck (voice)	Episode: "Trucks"
2022–2024	Alice's Wonderland Bakery	Queen of Hearts (voice)	TV series; 32 episodes
2025	Brilliant Minds	Pastor Maria Thomas	Episode: "The Man Who Can't See Faces"
2025	The Equalizer	Dr. Tiffany Luttrell	Episode: "Trust No One"
2025	FBI: Most Wanted	NYPD Det. Ramos	Episode: "Four Bodies"
2026	Sofia the First: Royal Magic	Zandrya (voice)	TV series; recurring role

== Stage ==
Year	Title	Role	Venue	Ref.
2003-2004	Wicked	Elphaba (standby)	Broadway, Gershwin Theatre	
2004	Brooklyn	Brooklyn	Broadway, Plymouth Theatre	
2005	Wicked	Elphaba	U.S. National Tour	
2006	Wicked	Elphaba	Broadway, Gershwin Theatre	
2007	Wicked	Elphaba	Pantages Theatre, Los Angeles	
2008	Rent	Maureen Johnson	Broadway, Nederlander Theatre	
2008	Flora the Red Menace	Flora	Regional, Reprise Theatre Company	
2008-2009	Wicked	Elphaba	Pantages Theatre, Los Angeles	
2010	Wicked	Elphaba	Orpheum Theatre, San Francisco	
2016	Rain	Sadie Thompson	Regional, Old Globe Theatre	
2016	Evita	Eva Perón	Regional, Studio Tenn Theatre Company and Tennessee Performing Arts Center	
2017	Lizzie the Musical	Emma Borden	International Tour, Denmark and United Kingdom	
2017	Merrily We Roll Along	Mary Flynn	Regional, Huntington Theatre Company	
2018	In The Heights	Daniela	Regional, Kennedy Center	
2018	Lempicka	Tamara de Lempicka	Regional, Williamstown Theatre Festival	
2018	West Side Story	Anita	Concert, BBC Proms	
2019	Falsettos	Trina	U.S. National Tour	
2021	The Gardens of Anuncia	Mamí (Carmen)	Regional Old Globe Theatre	
2022	Lempicka	Tamara de Lempicka	Regional, La Jolla Playhouse	
2023	The Gardens of Anuncia	Mamí (Carmen)	Off-Broadway, Lincoln Center Theatre	
2024	Lempicka	Tamara de Lempicka	Broadway, Longacre Theatre	

== Recordings ==
- Top 25 Praise Songs – Updated (2000)
- Top 25 Acoustic Worship Songs (2002)
- The Maury Yeston Songbook (2003)
- Hair – The Actors' Fund of America Benefit Recording (2005)
- Bright Lights, Big City (2005 concept album)
- Brooklyn the Musical (2005 Original Broadway Cast Recording)
- Dreaming Wide Awake: The Music of Scott Alan (2007)
- David Burnham – featured duet: "As Long as You're Mine" (2007)
- Magical: Disney's New Nighttime Spectacular of Magical Celebrations (Disneyland, 2009) – Featured Vocals
- Celebrate! Tokyo Disneyland (Tokyo Disneyland, 2018) – Featured Vocals
- Lempicka: Original Broadway Cast Recording (2024)

== Solo albums ==
- Look Around (2012)
- Revelation (2019)

== Awards and nominations ==
Year	Association	Category	Nominated work	Result
2005	Drama League Award	Distinguished Performance	Brooklyn	Nominated
2006	Broadway.com Audience Choice Award	Favorite Female Replacement	Wicked	Won
2022	Children's and Family Emmy Awards	Outstanding Voice Performance in a Preschool Animated Program	Alice's Wonderland Bakery	Nominated
2024	Tony Awards	Best Actress in a Musical	Lempicka	Nominated
2024	Broadway.com Audience Awards	Favorite Leading Actress in a Musical	Lempicka	Nominated
2024	Broadway.com Audience Awards	Favorite Diva Performance	Lempicka	Nominated
2024	Drama League Awards	Distinguished Performance	The Gardens of Anuncia and Lempicka	Nominated
