= Marc Routh =

Marc Routh is a theatrical producer, entrepreneur and professor.

== Background ==
Routh was born in Youngstown, Ohio, and raised in nearby Liberty Township. He graduated from Liberty High School in 1980.

As a child he performed in musicals in summer stock, community theatre, and children's theatre productions, including roles in Mame, Gypsy, Bye, Bye, Birdie, Oliver, Peter Pan, Alice in Wonderland, and A Christmas Carol. He won a scholarship to a musical theatre program at Kent State University. With acting partner Judith Sewickley, he placed 7th in an Ohio State duet acting competition.

Routh served as a management assistant under mentor Bentley Lenhoff at the Youngstown Playhouse and took classes at Youngstown State University while attending high school.

His college years at the University of North Carolina at Chapel Hill also included positions as company manager and director of Audience Development for PlayMakers Repertory Company, and during the summers he served as administrative assistant for Horse Cave Theatre in Horse Cave, Kentucky, and as the company manager and administrative assistant under Jean Passanante and Lloyd Richards for the O’Neill Theater Center in New York and Connecticut.

== Early career ==
He began his career in New York in 1984 as a management assistant for Richard Horner and Lynne Stuart, working on productions of Kennedy at Colonus and Lady Day, followed by a year working for publicist Milly Schoenbaum in the office of producer Morton Gottlieb, where the productions he worked on included the original production of Little Shop of Horrors, which he would later produce in its Broadway premiere. It was during his work as the press agent for the original off-Broadway production of Orphans at the Westside Arts Theatre that he first met Richard Frankel. Frankel was producing Penn & Teller which was playing in the downstairs theatre and Orphans was playing in the upstairs theatre. Their first meeting was to negotiate lobby space since Penn & Teller had opened first and has wallpapered the shared lobby with Penn & Teller posters.

Routh began working with Frankel as an assistant later that year, subsequently joining Frankel as a manager with Richard Frankel Productions and eventually as a producing partner with Frankel, Thomas Viertel, and Steven Baruch.

== Broadway and Off-Broadway career ==
Routh's first producing credit was Three Ways Home by Casey Kurtti in 1988, starring Mary McDonnell, S. Epatha Merkerson, and Malcolm Jamal-Warner, for which he served as executive producer. Additional off Broadway credits include Stomp, Marvin's Room, and Jeffrey as executive producer, Family Secrets, Bomb-itty of Errors, Communicating Doors, Death Defying Acts, Ennio, Love Letters, Necessary Targets and Wild Men! as general manager, and Song of Singapore, Later Life, Bubbe Meises, Bubbie Stories, and Das Barbecu as associate producer. Routh's off-Broadway producing credits include The Immersive Great Gatsby, Tap Dogs, The Mystery of Irma Vep, The Most Fabulous Story Ever Told, Three-For-All, My Old Lady, Inside Out, If Memory Serves, Mnemonic, The Water Coolers, Cookin’, The Fantasticks (revival), Mayumana’s Be, Old Jews Telling Jokes, Murder Ballad and the revival of Smokey Joe's Cafe.

Broadway producing credits include The Roommate, Back to the Future, Be More Chill, Oklahoma!, Angels in America, The Parisian Woman, The Band's Visit, Anastasia, Amelie, In Transit, Simon McBurney's The Encounter, Penn & Teller on Broadway, An American in Paris, Chaplin, Leap of Faith, Burn the Floor, A Little Night Music, The Norman Conquests, A Catered Affair, Gypsy, Young Frankenstein, Legally Blonde, Company, Sweeney Todd, Little Shop of Horrors, Hairspray, The Producers, Swing!, Kat and the Kings, The Weir, The Sound of Music, and Forever Tango. As associate producer, credits include Smokey Joe's Cafe, The Triumph of Love, A Funny Thing Happened on the Way to the Forum, and Penn & Teller: The Refrigerator Tour. Broadway general management credits include The Rocky Horror Show Live, What's Wrong With This Picture?, and Love Letters.

In the West End his productions have included Back to the Future, Young Frankenstein, The Producers, Hairspray, Smokey Joe's Cafe, Porgy and Bess, Flashdance, This Is Our Youth, Little Shop of Horrors, Simply Heavenly, Dolly West's Kitchen, Oleanna, and Immodesty Blaise and Walter's Burlesque. From 2000 to 2005, along with partners Richard Frankel, Thomas Viertel, and Steven Baruch and British partners Edward Snape and Paddy Wilson ran The Arts Theatre in the West End.

== Cancelled productions ==
Routh co-produced Little Shop of Horrors, which was announced for Broadway with a full-page ad in The New York Times for a production starring Alice Ripley and Hunter Foster. However, the production was cancelled; later that year, a production directed by Jerry Zaks starring Foster and Kerry Butler opened on Broadway to mixed reviews.

Routh was the producer of Flashdance, which had twice announced an opening on Broadway but has been postponed both times. It played a short season in London's West End and toured North America.

== Other activities ==
He served at the president of the League of Off-Broadway Theatres and Producers for eight years, from 1999 to 2007. He is one of the founders of On the Road, a theatrical booking agency, Showtix, a Broadway group sales company that was acquired by Hollywood Media and Broadway Inner Circle, a premium ticket agency. He is a member of The Broadway League, the Society of London Theatre, and the League of Off Broadway Theatres and Producers.

From 2000 to 2005, he was the operator with partners of the Arts Theatre in London, presenting such productions as The Pet Shop Boys Musical Closer to Heaven. In 2012, along with partners Richard Frankel, Tom Viertel, and Steven Barch opened the cabaret nightclub 54 Below, a 150-seat performance venue and restaurant with leading Broadway performers and emerging talent. Patti LuPone was the opening act in June 2012.

He was the founder and operator of Journey, an immersive dining experience at 27 West 24th Street in the Flatiron district that merges theatrical gastronomy with multi-media elements, incorporating Journey 360, Journey Salon, Journey Cafe, and Journey Odyssey.

The awards he and his partners won for the new club include the Tony Award Honor For Excellence in the Theatre, the MAC Board of Directors Award, The Nightlife Award, The June Briggs Award for Excellence in Destination Management, and The Concierge Choice Award for Nightlife. In 2018 he and his partners were honored by New York Musical Festival for their contribution to musical theatre.

With partner Simone Genatt he formed Broadway Asia Company in 1992, Broadway Asia International in 2009 and Broadway International in 2014. Broadway Asia Company is a booking and licensing agency which represents select Broadway productions as well as the Rodgers and Hammerstein catalogue. Producing credits include the North American tours of the Vietnamese Water Puppets and Cookin’, as well as productions of Stomp, Swing, Smokey Joe's Cafe, Hairspray, Cinderella starring Lea Salonga, The King and I, 42nd Street, SpongeBob SquarePants, An American in Paris, The Producers and The Sound of Music in Asia and the ground-breaking Mandarin language production of I Love You, You're Perfect, Now Change which premiered in Shanghai, toured China, and the Chinese cast performed in repertory with the New York cast in the original off-Broadway production at the Westside Theatre. The Creature from the Black Lagoon is a new musical which premiered at Universal Studios Hollywood. The musical Reel to Real, utilizing live performers and footage from the golden age of the Hollywood movies, premiered in Beijing and was presented at the Edinburgh Fringe Festival. Routh and Genatt served as executive producers of the musical version of Jay Chou's The Secret, Neverland, the immersive Peter Pan experience, China Goes Pop, and Mamma Mia! The Party in Rotterdam.

Routh is the recipient of the Robert Whitehead Award for Outstanding Commercial Theatre Producer in 1997, was inducted into the NYU Entrepreneurship Hall of Fame in 2003, and has been the recipient of 8 Tony Awards for The Producers, Hairspray, The Norman Conquests, Company, Angels in America, and The Band's Visit and Oklahoma!; and 54 Below; 2 Olivier Awards for The Producers and Hairspray; The Evening Standard Award for The Producers; 9 Drama Desk Awards for Marvin's Room, Stomp, Mnemonic, Hairspray, Sweeney Todd, Company, The Producers, The Norman Conquests, and Angels in America; 9 Outer Critics Circle Awards for Marvin's Room, Song of Singapore, Jeffrey, Hairspray, Sweeney Todd, Company, Young Frankenstein, An American in Paris and Angels in America; 2 Obie Awards for Stomp and Tap Dogs; The Helpmann Award for The Producers; The Dora Award for The Producers; The New England Critics Award for Sweeney Todd; The Carbonell Award for Sweeney Todd; 2 Lucille Lortel Awards for The Mystery of Irma Vep and Mneumonic; and 8 Drama League Awards for The Producers, Sweeney Todd, Hairspray, A Catered Affair, Company, An American in Paris Angels in America, and The Band's Visit.

From 1994 to 2023 he taught "Business Management for the Performing Arts" for Brooklyn College’s graduate school program in theatre administration.

He is subject of a chapter in the book The Art of Doing: How Superachievers Do What They Do and How They Do It So Well published by Plume.
