= Richard Frankel (producer) =

American theatrical producer

- Born: Brooklyn, New York
- Education: Brooklyn College
- Occupations: Theatrical producer and general manager
- Known for: The Producers, Hairspray
- Spouse: Kathleen Clark

Richard Frankel is an American theatrical producer and general manager who has been producing and managing on and off-Broadway since 1970. He has been working in partnership with Tom Viertel, Steve Baruch, and Marc Routh since 1985.

== Biography ==
Richard Frankel was born in Brooklyn, New York, in 1947. His work in the theatre began at 16 in a Catskills hotel nightclub, and he worked for The Barry Farber Show on WOR AM in New York while a student at Brooklyn College. After serving for two years in the Peace Corps in Ethiopia, he worked as a stage manager and technician in New York and Europe, including at La Mama Experimental Theatre Club and the Public Theater in New York and the Mickery Theatre in Amsterdam. Upon returning to the United States in 1973, he worked off-Broadway and in regional theaters as a stage manager, administrator, press agent and marketing director, and in 1981 became Managing Director of Circle Repertory Company.

At Circle Rep he worked on dozens of world premieres of plays by playwrights including Lanford Wilson, Sam Shepard, David Mamet and Jules Feiffer with an acting company that included Jeff Daniels, Tanya Berezin, Judd Hirsch, Barnard Hughes, William Hurt, Richard Thomas and Fritz Weaver. Plays included Talley's Folley, 5th of July, Buried Child, Fool for Love and Balm in Gilead directed by John Malkovich in a co production with the Steppenwolf Theatre Company.

In 1985, he formed Richard Frankel Productions and together with partners Tom Viertel and Steve Baruch produced Penn & Teller's first off-Broadway show, which first brought them to national attention. The show was critically acclaimed, and the new-formed producing partnership subsequently presented Penn & Teller on national tour and on Broadway.

In 1991 Marc Routh was added as a producing partner and they together produced a string of successful Off-Broadway shows including Driving Miss Daisy, Frankie and Johnny in the Clair de Lune and Love Letters. In 1994 Richard Frankel Productions and Marc Routh, along with others, produced Stomp, which ran at the Orpheum Theatre in New York City for 29 years and still tours throughout the United States. The Viertel/Routh/Baruch/Frankel partnership's early Broadway projects included Angels in America Part One and Part Two, The Sound of Music, and Smokey Joe's Cafe, which would go on to become Broadway's longest-running revue.

In 2000, Frankel and his partners were selected by Mel Brooks to serve on the team of producers for The Producers. The musical would go on to break the all-time Tony Awards records by earning twelve awards in 2001, winning the Tony Award in all categories for which it was eligible. Frankel's partnership followed this success with another hit when they opened Hairspray in 2003. Other Broadway productions included the John Doyle-directed revivals of Sweeney Todd and Company, the Patti LuPone-led revival of Gypsy, and the Catherine Zeta-Jones-led revival of A Little Night Music.

During this time period, Frankel and his team also produced in London, including transfers of their Broadway mountings and new productions, and across Asia as part of a partnership with Broadway Asia, owned by Routh. They also operated the Arts Theatre in London from 2000 to 2005.

In 2008, Frankel formed Frankel Green Theatrical Management with his long-term general managing partner Laura Green in order to expand general management services. Apart from shows produced by Frankel and his partners, the company managed the Broadway productions Rock of Ages, Finian's Rainbow, and Forever Tango. Green left the company in 2013 to become the Production Manager of Paper Mill Playhouse.

In 2012, Frankel and his partners Viertel, Baruch, and Routh announced plans to build and produce a new cabaret space 54 Below. The space opened on June 2, 2012, with a two-week engagement by Patti LuPone. It has gone on to play over one thousand shows by over two hundred artists. In addition to earning many cabaret awards, 54 Below was awarded a 2022 Tony Award Honor for Excellence in the Theatre for its mission to preserve the music of Broadway and expand the art of the cabaret.

Frankel is married to playwright Kathleen Clark and has three children and four grandchildren.

== Credits ==
=== Broadway ===
- Back to the Future, the Musical (2023)
- The Parisian Woman (2017)
- The Encounter (2016)
- Penn & Teller On Broadway (2015)
- Forever Tango (2013)*
- Leap of Faith (2012)
- Finian's Rainbow (2009)*
- Rock of Ages (2009)*
- A Little Night Music (2009)
- Burn the Floor (2009)
- The Norman Conquests (2009)
- Gypsy (2008)
- Young Frankenstein (2007)
- Company (2007)
- Sweeney Todd (2006)
- Little Shop of Horrors (2003)
- Hairspray (2003)
- The Producers (2001)
- The Rocky Horror Show (2000)*
- Swing! (1999)
- The Sound of Music (1998)
- Forever Tango (1997)
- A Funny Thing Happened on the Way to the Forum (1996)°
- Smokey Joe's Cafe (1995)
- What's Wrong With This Picture? (1994)*
- Damn Yankees (1994)°
- Angels in America: Perestroika (1994)°
- Angels in America: Millennium Approaches (1993)°
- Penn & Teller: The Refrigerator Tour (1991)
- Love Letters (1989)
- Penn & Teller (1987)

=== Off-Broadway ===
- Murder Ballad (2013)
- Old Jews Telling Jokes (2012)
- Standing on Ceremony (2011)
- The Fantasticks (2006)
- Family Secrets*
- The Water Coolers (2002)
- My Old Lady (2002)
- Surviving Grace (2002)*
- Mnemonic (2001)
- If Memory Serves (1999)
- Three-For-All (1997)
- Tap Dogs (1997)
- Inside Out (1994)
- Stomp (1994)
- Das Barbecu (1994)
- Later Life (1993)
- Jeffrey (1993)
- Bubbe Meises, Bubbe Stories (1992)
- Marvin's Room (1992)
- Penn & Teller Rot in Hell (1991)
- Song of Singapore (1991)
- Love Letters (1989)
- The Cocktail Hour (1989)
- Frankie and Johnny in the Clair de Lune (1987)
- Driving Miss Daisy (1987)
- Sills & Company (1986)
- Penn & Teller (1985)

=== London (Producing) ===
- Young Frankenstein (2017)
- Endgame (2009)
- Hairspray (2007)
- Little Shop of Horrors (2006)
- Porgy and Bess (2006)
- Simply Heavenly (2005)
- Guys and Dolls (2005)
- A Life in the Theatre (2005)
- Don Carlos (2005)
- Some Girl(s) (2005)
- The Producers (2004)
- The Woman in White (2004)
- Calico (2004)
- Democracy (2003)
- This is Our Youth (2002)
- Dolly West's Kitchen (1999)
- Smokey Joe's Cafe (1996)
- Oleanna (1993 & 2004)
- Driving Miss Daisy (1988)
- Becket
- Marvin's Room

== Awards ==
=== Tony Awards ===
- The Norman Conquests (2009)
- Company (2007)
- Hairspray (2003)
- The Producers (2001)
- Angels in America: Perestroika (1994)
- Angels in America: Millennium Approaches (1993)

=== Olivier Awards ===
- Hairspray (2008)
- The Producers (2005)
- Back to the Future, the Musical (2022)

=== Drama Desk Awards ===
- The Norman Conquests (2009)
- Company (2007)
- Sweeney Todd (2006)
- Hairspray (2003)
- The Producers (2001)
- Mnemonic (Unique Theatrical Experience, 2001)
- Angels in America: Perestroika (1994)
- Angels in America: Millennium Approaches (1993)
- Marvin's Room (1992)

=== Lortel Awards ===
- Lifetime Achievement (2012)
- Mnemonic (Unique Theatrical Experience, 2001)
- The Mystery of Irma Vep (1999)
- The Cocktail Hour (1989)

=== Outer Critics Circle Awards ===
- Marvin's Room (1992)
- Song of Singapore (1992)
- Driving Miss Daisy (1987)
