= Nanta =

Nanta may refer to:

- Notia, Greece - Nânta
- Nanta (show), a South Korean theatrical show

== Chinese place name ==
- Nanta, Chenzhou (南塔街道), a subdistrict of Suxian District, Chenzhou, Hunan.
