= Bronco Billy =

1980 film by Clint Eastwood

- Theatrical release poster
- Directed by: Clint Eastwood
- Written by: Dennis Hackin
- Produced by: Dennis Hackin; Neil Dobrofsky
- Starring: Clint Eastwood; Sondra Locke
- Cinematography: David Worth
- Edited by: Joel Cox; Ferris Webster
- Music by: Snuff Garrett
- Distributed by: Warner Bros. Pictures
- Release date: June 11, 1980
- Running time: 116 minutes
- Country: United States
- Language: English
- Budget: $6.5 million
- Box office: $24.3 million (domestic)

Bronco Billy is a 1980 American Western comedy-drama film starring Clint Eastwood and Sondra Locke. It was directed by Eastwood and written by Dennis Hackin. The film focuses on "Bronco" Billy McCoy, the financially struggling owner of a traditional Wild West show and his new assistant Antoinette Lily.

== Plot ==
"Bronco" Billy McCoy is an aging trick-shooter performing to meager crowds in "Bronco Billy's Wild West Show", a rundown traveling circus reminiscent of Buffalo Bill's Wild West, of which he is the owner and operator. For the show's finale, a blindfolded Bronco Billy shoots balloons around female assistant Mitzi Fritts strapped onto a revolving wooden disc. The last balloon is with a knife, but Mitzi moves her leg and is injured, so then quits.

Due to poor show attendance, Bronco Billy has been unable to pay his crew for the last six months, though they stick with him. At the next town, Bronco Billy goes to the city hall to obtain a permit. Also there are heiress Antoinette Lily and John Arlington, who have eloped. Antoinette despises Arlington, but she must marry before turning 30 to inherit a large fortune. Their car breaks down at the motel opposite the Wild West show. The next morning, Arlington steals Antoinette's money, luggage, and the repaired car. Left stranded, Antoinette asks Bronco Billy for help. He hires her as his new assistant under the alias Miss Lily though she agrees to only one show. Antoinette ad libs her lines, entertaining the audience, but irritating Bronco Billy.

Antoinette discovers that Arlington has been arrested for her murder, framed by her stepmother Irene and her scheming lawyer friend Edgar Lipton, who stand to gain the inheritance. Seizing an opportunity for revenge, Antoinette rejoins the Wild West show to remain incognito. She gradually learns that Bronco Billy's performers are not actually cowboys, but largely ex-convicts, alcoholics or both, and have remade their lives into what they want to be. Bronco Billy is a failed shoe salesman from New Jersey, who shot his wife in the leg for sleeping with his best friend. Nevertheless, Antoinette begins to warm to the troupe.

Performers Lorraine Running Water and Chief Big Eagle announce they are expecting a baby together. The crew celebrates at a bar, though a fight breaks out. When Antoinette is nearly sexually assaulted, Billy and the crew come to her rescue. After, youngest member Leonard James is arrested after being recognized as an Army deserter. Bronco Billy uses the show's meager savings to bribe Sheriff Dix into releasing him, enduring Dix's verbal taunts. When the circus tent burns down, everyone blames Antoinette for their bad luck, but Bronco Billy defends her. He proposes robbing a train to raise money for a replacement. They attempt the heist in the antiquated Western way, driving alongside in a car and Billy on horseback attempting to jump on, but a modern train derails their effort.

The troupe arrives at a mental institution, where they annually perform pro bono. The director, Dr. Canterbury, provides them with accommodations and the inmates make a new circus tent sewn together with American flags. Antoinette and Bronco Billy spend the night together. By chance, one inmate is Arlington. The crooked Edgar persuaded him to plead insanity after he supposedly "murdered" Antoinette. When Arlington sees her, proving Antoinette is alive, he is released. Bronco Billy and the show depart without Antoinette.

Antoinette returns to her luxurious life but she is bored and misses Billy, who drowns his loneliness with alcohol. During a performance, Bronco Billy is about to introduce his new assistant "Miss Lily" who is actually fellow performer "Lefty" LeBow dressed as a woman. The real Miss Lily appears, instead. The show, now a raving success, runs smoothly. Bronco Billy ends it with a positive message for the children in the audience.

== Cast ==
- Clint Eastwood as Billy "Bronco Billy" McCoy
- Sondra Locke as Antoinette Lily
- Geoffrey Lewis as John Arlington
- Scatman Crothers as "Doc" Lynch
- Bill McKinney as "Lefty" LeBow
- Sam Bottoms as Leonard James
- Dan Vadis as Chief Big Eagle
- Sierra Pecheur as Lorraine Running Water
- Walter Barnes as Sheriff Dix
- Woodrow Parfrey as Dr. Canterbury
- Beverlee McKinsey as Irene Lily
- Doug McGrath as Lieutenant Wiecker
- Hank Worden as Station Mechanic
- William Prince as Edgar Lipton
- Tessa Richarde as Miss Mitzi Fritts
- Chuck Hicks as Bar Cowboy
- Merle Haggard as Himself
- Alison Eastwood as Orphan (uncredited)
- Kyle Eastwood as Orphan (uncredited)

== Production ==
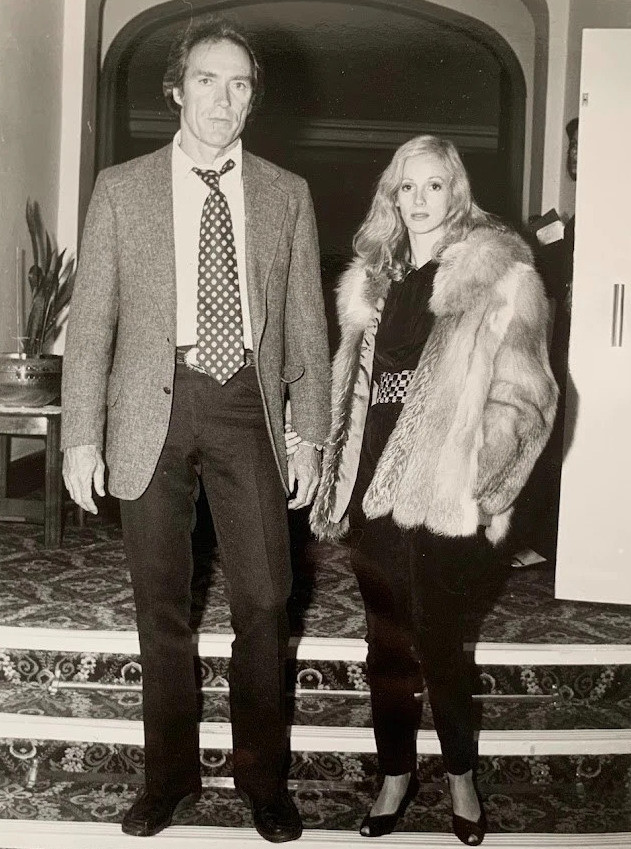
Eastwood and Locke blamed each other for the film's commercial underperformance.

Clint Eastwood received Dennis Hackin and Neal Dobrofsky's script and decided to make the film with longtime companion Sondra Locke. The film was shot in two months in the Boise metropolitan area in the fall of 1979. Additional filming took place in Eastern Oregon and Manhattan. Filmed on a low budget of $5 million, it finished two to four weeks ahead of schedule.

== Soundtrack ==
The soundtrack album, released on Elektra Records and headlined by Merle Haggard and Ronnie Milsap, also featured singing by Eastwood himself. Haggard's "Misery and Gin" was a number one country hit, followed by "Bar Room Buddies", a duet with Clint Eastwood, which reached number 3 on the Billboard Hot Country Songs chart.

== Reception ==
On Rotten Tomatoes, it holds a score of 72% based on 22 reviews with a mean of 6.4 of a possible 10. Eastwood has cited Bronco Billy as being one of the most affable shoots of his career, and biographer Richard Schickel has argued that the character of Bronco Billy McCoy is his most self-referential work. The film was a modest commercial hit, but was appreciated by critics. Janet Maslin of The New York Times believed the film was "the best and funniest Clint Eastwood movie in quite a while," praising Eastwood's directing and the way he intricately juxtaposes the old West and the new.

Although the film grossed some $25 million, i.e. four to five times its cost during its United States theatrical release, Eastwood considered it insufficient.

== Awards and nominations ==
- 1st Golden Raspberry Awards

Nominated: Worst Actress (Sondra Locke)

== Stage musical ==
A stage musical adaptation premiered in Los Angeles in 2019 with a book by Hackin, with music and lyrics by Chip Rosenbloom and John Torres, and additional lyrics by Michele Brourman. It premiered in London in 2024.

== See also ==
- List of American films of 1980

== Bibliography ==
- Hughes, Howard (2009). Aim for the Heart. I.B. Tauris. ISBN 9781845119027.
- Gentry, Ric (1999). "Director Clint Eastwood: Attention to Detail and Involvement for the Audience". In Kapsis, Robert E.; Coblentz, Kathie (eds.). Clint Eastwood: Interviews. University Press of Mississippi. ISBN 1578060702.
- Schickel, Richard (1996). Clint Eastwood: A Biography. Knopf. ISBN 9780679429746.
