= Roleplay (disambiguation) =

Roleplay is the changing of one's behaviour to assume a role.

Roleplay may also refer to:

- Role-playing game, a game in which players assume the roles of characters in a fictional setting
- Roleplay simulation, an experiential learning method
- Sexual roleplay, the act of acting out sexual scenarios
  - Animal roleplay, the act of playing a non-human animal
- Inside Out (musical), formerly known as Roleplay, a 1989 musical by Adryan Russ and Doug Haverty
- RolePlay (play), a 2001 play Alan Ayckbourn
- Role Play, a 2024 American film
- "Role Play", a song by The Original 7ven from the 2011 album Condensate
- Dimension (data warehouse) § Role-playing dimension, the recycling of a dimension for multiple applications within the same database
