= Bronco Billy The Musical =

2019 stage musical

Bronco Billy
- The Musical
- Music: Chip Rosenbloom; John Torres
- Lyrics: Chip Rosenbloom; John Torres; Michele Brourman
- Book: Dennis Hackin
- Basis: Bronco Billy by Dennis Hackin
- Premiere: May 18, 2019: Skylight Theatre Company, Los Angeles
- Productions: 2019 Los Angeles; 2024 Off-West End

Bronco Billy The Musical is a stage musical with a book by Dennis Hackin, music and lyrics by Chip Rosenbloom and John Torres, with additional lyrics by Michele Brourman based on the 1980 film of the same name directed by Clint Eastwood and written by Dennis Hackin.

== Production history ==
=== World premiere: Los Angeles (2019) ===
The musical made its world premiere at the Skylight Theatre Company in Los Angeles on May 18, 2019 (with previews from May 10) running until July 21. The production was directed by Hunter Bird.

=== London (2024) ===
The musical had its UK premiere at the Charing Cross Theatre in Off West End, London opening 24 January for a limited run until 7 April 2024. It was directed by Hunter Bird and starred Emily Benjamin as Antoinette Lily and Tarinn Callender as Bronco Billy, with Victoria Hamilton-Barritt playing Constance.

== Musical Numbers ==
Act 1:

- "Ride With Us"
- "Make 'Em Stand Up"
- "Ollie The Owl"
- "I Miss You"
- "All That Money"
- "Tomorrow Starts Today"
- "It's Gonna Be Great"
- "It's Business"
- "Trust Me I'm A Cowboy"
- "Back to Me"
- "Look In The Mirror"
- "At The Disco"
- "Just A Dance"

Act 2:

- "We've Come So Far"
- "Dreamers"
- "When Everything Is Real"
- "Going Places"
- "Make 'Em Stand Up (Reprise)"
- "Mama's Done With Sweet"
- "I Miss You (Reprise)"
- "Mama's Done With Sweet (Reprise)"
- "I'm Gonna Be Strong"
- "Showdown"
- "Ride With Us Finale"
- "Mega Mix Bows"

== Cast and Characters ==
Character	Los Angeles 2019	London 2024
Bronco Billy	Eric B. Anthony	Tarinn Callender
Constance Lily	Michelle Azar	Victoria Hamilton-Barritt
Antoinette Lily	Amanda Leigh Jerry	Emily Benjamin
Dee Dee Delaware	-	Gemma Atkins
Sam Lily	Anthony Marciona	Jonathan Bourne
Lasso Leonard James	Kyle Frattini	Josh Butler
Mitzi Fritts	Bella Hicks	Alice Croft
Edgar White Lipton	Marc Cardiff	Chris Jared
Doc Blue	Benai Boyd	Karen Mavundukure
Lefty Lebow	Randy Charleville	Henry Maynard
Sinclair St Clair	Pat Towne	Alexander McMorran
Joe Eagle	Michael Uribes	Aharon Rayner
Lorraine	Fatima El-Bashir	Helen K Wint
John Arlington	Chris M Kauffmann	Silas Wyatt-Barke
