= Simone Genatt =

- Education: Stanford University
- Known for: Founder and Chairperson of Broadway Asia
- Spouse: James Haft
- Children: Jacob and Harrison Haft

Simone Genatt is a Broadway producer and founder and chairperson of Broadway Asia, among the largest international production, management and distribution companies for Broadway and other live entertainment across the global markets.

== Background ==
Simone Genatt grew up in New York and attended Stanford University. She co-founded Broadway Asia with her business partner, Marc Routh. Over the last 20 years, the Broadway Asia partners have played in 400 cities in over 40 countries on five continents including over 30 cities in mainland China. Genatt has recently collaborated on productions with Rodgers & Hammerstein, Nickelodeon, DreamWorks Animation, Universal Studios, MGM Theatrical, Warner Bros, Stage Entertainment, Elephant Eye Theatricals, Baruch/Frankel/Viertel/Routh, Nederlander Worldwide, Resorts World, CMC Live, Sevenages, China Broadway Entertainment and China Arts and Entertainment Group.

== Early life ==
Genatt began her career as the managing director of the Aspen Theater Company, and is the co-founder of the Aspen Art Park. She then returned to New York to pursue her dreams on Broadway, and spent two years apprenticing to Gerald Schoenfeld, the former Chairman of the Shubert Organization, followed by several years working for Broadway producer, Roger Berlind, before establishing Broadway Asia. She is a founding board member of Urban Arts Partnership, among the largest arts education companies in New York with an annual budget of $12 million, providing arts education programs to over 60,000 students annually.

== Career ==
On Broadway, Genatt produced The Sound of Music, Little Shop of Horrors, Legally Blonde, An American in Paris, Amelie and Anastasia. She is the Executive Producer of DreamWorks' Kung Fu Panda, Jay Chou's The Secret, Neverland: The Peter Pan Immersive Entertainment, China Goes Pop!, Cookin/Nanta and Brazil Brazil. Genatt's producing career extends beyond Broadway to Japan, Korea and China. She has been working in mainland China since the early 1990s, and has done more than 35 productions throughout the territory. She started networking with Chinese producers in 1988, but they were not yet ready for the Broadway musical art form. Broadway Asia has since created theatrical training schools in several Asian cities, which teach the basics of musical theater performance. Genatt has been committed to fostering international collaborations and building live entertainment infrastructure systems within China, Korea and other emerging markets territories to support the expansion and exploitation of Broadway shows. This includes co-productions between Tony Award-winning artists and local artists like Cookin'/Nanta and Jay Chou's The Secret. “It’s really easy to write a bad musical and it’s really really hard to write a good one”. The Chinese government has welcomed this art form by building more than 25 new theaters. In China, “People feel if they make their lives better in terms of art, entertainment, and culture, that the country will be more productive and Broadway is riding that wave. They want what’s new, what’s hot, what’s cool, and Broadway represents the best of the West.” Genatt has said that she is in the Chinese market because she admires the Chinese and the Chinese admire Broadway.

== Notable productions ==
- An American in Paris
- Amelie
- Anastasia
- The Sound of Music
- The King and I
- Cinderella
- The Producers
- Hairspray
- Rock of Ages
- Legally Blonde
- The Addams Family
- West Side Story
- 42nd Street
- In The Heights
- Swing!
- Reel to Real, the Movies Musical
- I Love You, You’re Perfect, Now Change
- Murder Ballad
- Cookin’/Nanta
- Stomp
- China Goes Pop!
- Manual Cinema
- SpongeBob Squarepants Live
- Ice Age Live
- I Got Merman
- Fuerzabruta
- Ice Musicals
- Neverland, The Peter Pan Immersive Theatrical Entertainment
- Jay Chou's The Secret
