= Broadway Asia =

International Broadway Production Company based in New York

- Location: New York City

Website
- broadwayasia.com

Broadway Asia is an international Broadway production company based in New York City. It was founded by partners Simone Genatt and Marc Routh in 1991.

== History ==
Broadway Asia is one of the largest production, management, distribution, licensing and touring companies of live entertainment throughout the Asia Pacific area. Marc Routh and Simone Genatt created Broadway Asia Company in 1991. China has embraced this new art form by building 25 theaters. Broadway Asia began by licensing American Broadway Shows to Chinese theaters, but has since expanded to building shows from the ground up in the respective countries native language. Broadway Asia also produces non-verbal shows as a means to bridge the communication, such as Cookin’/Nanta which is the longest running show in Korea's history. Broadway Asia has collaborated with numerous artists and producers including Warner Bros. Theatrical Ventures, Rodgers & Hammerstein Theater Library, Imagem Music Publishing, Nickelodeon Recreation, DreamWorks Animation, Universal Studios, MGM Theatrical, Stage Entertainment, Elephant Eye Theatricals, S2BN, Baruch/ Frankel/Viertel/Routh, Nederlander Worldwide, Resorts World, S.M. Entertainment, and China Broadway Entertainment.

== Productions ==
A selection of current productions include: the live action DreamWorks Kung Fu Panda Spectacular, directed and choreographed by Susan Stroman; Amelie, the new Broadway musical based on the award-winning French film; the global tour of Andrew Lloyd Webber's production of The Sound of Music; an extensive Mandarin language China Tour of The Sound of Music; Jay Chou's new musical, The Secret, premiering in Mainland China; Neverland, the Peter Pan Immersive Theater Entertainment in Mainland China; Murder Ballad in Tokyo; and China Goes Pop at the Edinburgh Fringe Festival.

Select international productions include: An American in Paris; The Sound of Music; The King and I; Cinderella; The Producers; Hairspray; Rock of Ages; Legally Blonde; The Addams Family; Little Shop of Horrors; Movin’ Out; Rent; West Side Story; 42nd Street; In The Heights; Swing!; Catch Me If You Can; Joseph and the Amazing Technicolor Dreamcoat; Reel to Real, the Movies Musical; Creature from the Black Lagoon; I Love You, You're Perfect, Now Change; Murder Ballad; Cookin’/Nanta; Stomp; Toxic Avenger; Evil Dead; Footloose; Big River; Smokey Joe's Cafe; Priscilla, Queen of the Desert; ICE AGE LIVE, A Mammoth Adventure; MADAGASCAR LIVE; SpongeBob SquarePants Live; Siddhartha, The Musical; I Got Merman; Vietnamese Water Puppets; Brazil! Brazil!; Fuerzabruta and many others.
