= Natalie McQueen =

British actress

- Born: 1 June 1989 (age 37); Dagenham, Greater London, England
- Occupations: Actress, singer,
- Known for: Bonnie & Clyde, Wicked, Kinky Boots, 9 to 5
- Website: nataliemcqueen.co.uk

Natalie McQueen (born 1 June 1989) is an English actress known for her performances in a number of UK West End productions including Bonnie & Clyde, 9 to 5, Kinky Boots and Wicked.

She was named as one of the ten theatre faces to look out for in 2017 after her performance in a one-night-only concert entitled An evening with Frank Wildhorn and friends in Manchester.

In September 2018, it was announced that McQueen would play the leading role of Doralee Rhodes in the first West End run of Broadway musical 9 to 5, a character originally played by Dolly Parton in the 1980s film of the same name.

== Early and personal life ==
McQueen was born in Dagenham, East London. She trained at CPA school and subsequently CPA studios, both part of Colin's Performing Arts Group founded by principal Colin Putz, alongside James Buckley, Jessie J, The Loveable Rogues, Anne Marie, Rochelle Humes, Frankie Bridge and Jack Shalloo.

As of 2022, she is dating American singer Josh Groban. Groban revealed on April 21, 2026 that they were engaged.

== Career ==
McQueen made her professional theatre debut at the age of 8, playing Young Eponine in Les Misérables, at the Palace Theatre, London. This was followed the role of Eva in the original London cast of Chitty Chitty Bang Bang at the London Palladium.

In 2013, McQueen was one of the five UK industry jury members for the Eurovision Song Contest alongside Tony Blackburn and Scott Mills.

In the same year, she joined the cast of Wicked at the Apollo Theatre in London. She performed a variety of roles up until 2016, including Elphaba and Nessarose. She also performed Elphaba's songs on behalf of Wicked at the West End Live Launches in 2015 and 2016, and at The Annual Wicked Young Writers Awards.

In 2015 and whilst still in Wicked, McQueen played Chrissie Starr in the workshop Becoming Nancy, directed by Jerry Mitchell and based on the book by Terry Ronald. The following year, McQueen was cast as the alternate to the leading role of Sara played by Kerry Ellis in Murder Ballad, in a cast that also included Ramin Karimloo, Victoria Hamilton-Barritt and Norman Bowman.

In 2017 McQueen was cast as the Mad Hatter in the European premiere of Frank Wildhorn’s Wonderland alongside Kerry Ellis, Wendi Peters and Dave Willetts. The show opened at the Edinburgh Playhouse and went on to tour the UK.

In 2017 she played Dinah in the rework of Andrew Lloyd Webber's Starlight Express at The Other Palace.

In April 2018, it was announced that McQueen would be taking over the role of Lauren in a new casting line-up for the West End production of Cyndi Lauper and Harvey Fierstein’s Kinky Boots, alongside Oliver Tompsett, Sean Needham and Simon-Anthony Rhoden, at the Adelphi Theatre in London’s West End. McQueen’s first performance was on 4 June 2018. The run of the show concluded on 12 January 2019.

In January 2019, McQueen began playing the role of Doralee Rhodes in the West End production of 9 To 5: The Musical at the Savoy Theatre in London. The show ran until August 31. McQueen received positive reviews for her performance.

In 2021 Natalie was announced to play Catherine in Pippin in London.

In 2022, Natalie played Blanche Barrow in Bonnie and Clyde in Concert Bonnie & Clyde at the Theatre Royal, Drury Lane. Broadway's Jeremy Jordan played Clyde Barrow with Frances Mayli McCann as Bonnie. It was later announced that McQueen would play the role as part of the original West End cast of Bonnie & Clyde, which is set to premiere at the Arts Theatre in April 2022.

== Theatre credits ==
Year	Title	Role	Venue	Production company
2002	Les Misérables	Young Eponine	Palace Theatre, London	Cameron Mackintosh Ltd
2002	Chitty Chitty Bang Bang	Eva (sewer child)	London Palladium	Michael Rose Productions
2011	Bluebirds	Virginia and Samantha	Above the Stag Theatre, London	Lambco
2012	Rent	Ensemble	Greenwich Theatre	Paul Taylor Mills Productions
2012	Spring Awakening	Ilse	Broadway Theatre, Catford	Broadway Theatre
2013	Chess	Angela St Angelo, cover Florence Vassey	Union Theatre, London	The Union Theatre
2013 and 2014	Wicked	Ensemble, 1st Cover Elphaba	Apollo Victoria	Playful Productions
2016	Wicked	Ensemble, 1st Cover Elphaba, 2nd Cover Nessarose	Apollo Victoria	Playful Productions
2016	Murder Ballad	Alternate Sara / Understudy Narrator (lead roles)	Arts Theatre, London	Soundcheck Productions
2017	Wicked	Nessarose (emergency standby)	Apollo Victoria	Playful Productions
2017	Wicked	Elphaba (emergency standby)	Apollo Victoria, London	Playful Productions
2017	Wonderland	The Mad Hatter	Edinburgh Playhouse and UK tour	Neil Eckersley Productions
2017	Les Misérables	Eponine	Pimlico Opera	Pimlico Opera
2017	Starlight Express	Dinah	The Other Palace, London	Really Useful Group
2018	Kinky Boots	Lauren	Adelphi Theatre, London	Playful Productions
2019	9 to 5 The Musical	Doralee	Savoy Theatre, London	Ambassador Theatre Group
2021	Pippin	Catherine	Charing Cross Theatre, London	Adam Blanshay Productions
2022	Bonnie & Clyde	Blanche Barrow	Theatre Royal, Drury Lane, London	DLAP & Fourth Wall
2022	Bonnie & Clyde	Blanche Barrow	Arts Theatre, London	DLAP & Fourth Wall
2022 and 2023	Jack & The Beanstalk	Jill	London Palladium, London	Crossroads Pantomimes
