= Charles Haid =

American actor and director (born 1943)

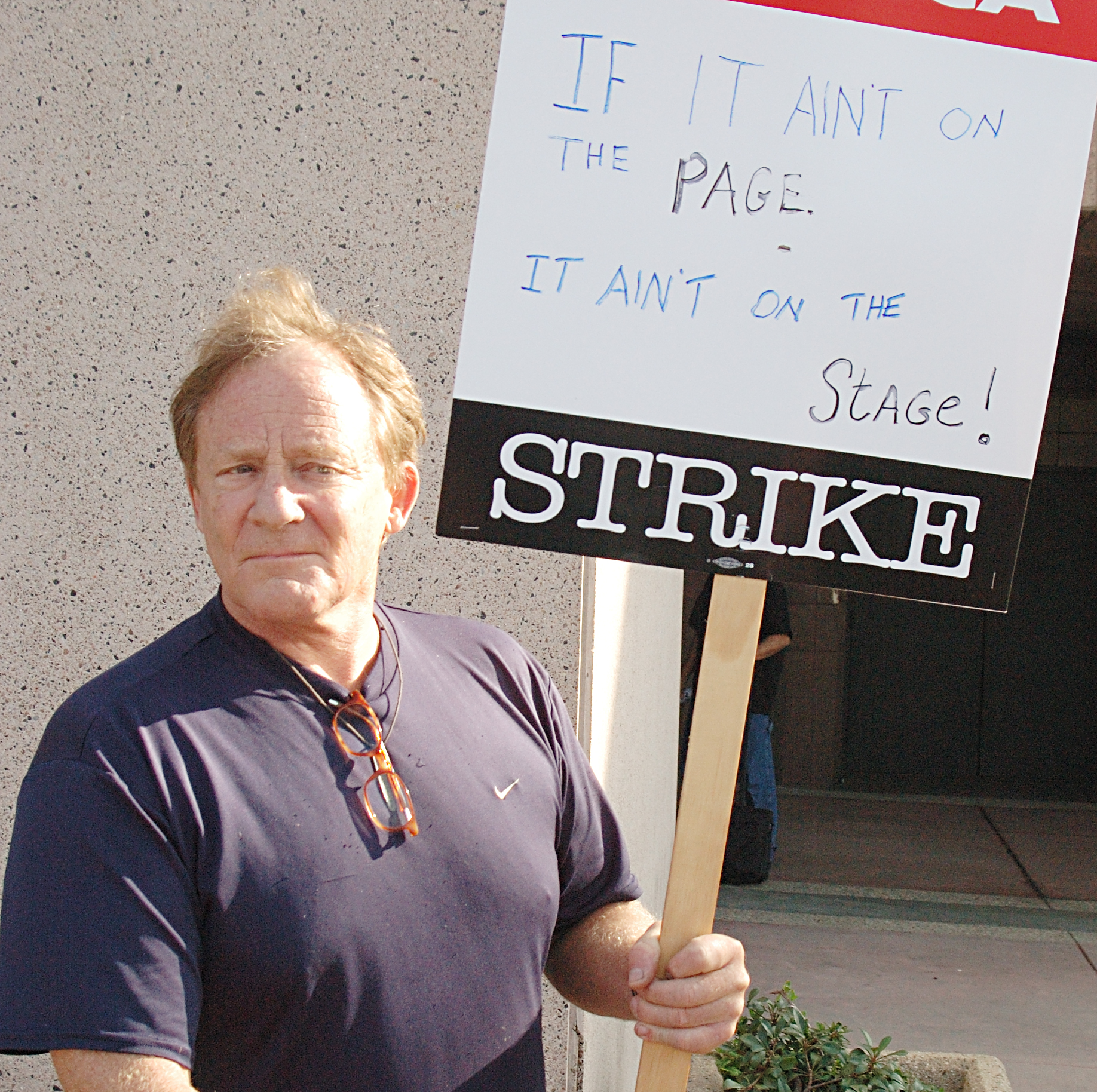
- Haid during the 2007 Writers Guild of America strike
- Born: Charles Maurice Haid III; June 2, 1943 (age 83); San Francisco, California, U.S.
- Occupations: Actor, director
- Years active: 1973–2016
- Spouses: Penelope Windust (m. 1975; div. 1984) Deborah Richter (m. 1985; div. 1988) Elisabeth Harmon-Haid (m. 1992)
- Children: 2

Charles Maurice Haid III (born June 2, 1943) is an American actor and television director, with notable work in both movies and television. He is best known for his portrayal of Officer Andy Renko in Hill Street Blues.

== Formative years ==
Haid was born in San Francisco, the son of Grace Marian (née Folger) and Charles Maurice Haid Jr. He is of Dutch (original last name Van Heidt) and Irish descent. He attended Palo Alto High School, then Carnegie Institute of Technology (now Carnegie Mellon University), where he met Steven Bochco. He was associate producer of the original stage production of Godspell in 1971, which was developed at CMU.

== Career ==
Haid's acting credits include the 1970s television series Delvecchio as Sgt. Paul Schonski, the 1980s series Hill Street Blues as Officer Andy Renko and the 1980 movie Altered States as Dr. Mason Parrish. In 1984, Haid was cast as Fats, a physician, in the United Artists film The House of God about medical interns in a busy city hospital. In 1988, Haid starred in the television film Weekend War with Stephen Collins.

In 2004–05, he played C.T. Finney, a corrupt New York police captain on the sixth season of the NBC show Third Watch. Haid provided the voice of the one-legged rabbit "Lucky Jack" in the 2004 Disney animated film Home on the Range. Twenty years earlier, Haid had voiced main character "Montgomery Moose" in the pilot episode of The Get Along Gang, produced by Nelvana. He was replaced by Sparky Marcus for the subsequent series.

His directing credits include an episode of ER that earned him a Directors Guild Award and nominations for the television film Buffalo Soldiers and an episode of NYPD Blue. He was a regular director on the FX series Nip/Tuck. He also directed for the FX series Sons of Anarchy and AMC's Breaking Bad. He was a regular director for the CBS series Criminal Minds, for which he also portrayed serial killer Randall Garner (a.k.a. "The Fisher King").

== Selected filmography ==
- Gunsmoke - "Like Old Times" (1974) as Hargis
- Harry O - "The Admiral's Lady" (1974) as Sgt. Garvey
- The Execution of Private Slovik (1974, TV movie) as Brockmeyer
- Alex & the Gypsy (1976) as Second Goon
- The Choirboys (1977) as Nick Yanov
- A Death in Canaan (1978, TV movie) as Sgt. Case
- The Bastard (1978, TV movie) as George Lumden
- Who'll Stop the Rain (1978) as Eddie Peace
- Deathmoon (1978) as Earl Wheelie
- Oliver's Story (1978) as Stephen Simpson
- The New Adventures of Wonder Woman - "The Girl with a Gift for Disaster" (1979) as Bob Baker
- Altered States (1980) as Mason Parrish
- Pray TV (1980) as Buck Sunday
- Twirl (1981, TV movie) as Matt Jordan
- Hill Street Blues (1981-87) as Officer Andy Renko (main character)
- Divorce Wars: A Love Story (1982, TV movie) as Fred Bemous
- The House of God (1984) as Fats (The Fatman)
- Six Against the Rock (1987, TV movie) as Sam Shockley
- Weekend War (1988, TV movie) as Sgt. Kupjack
- Cop (1988) - Delbert 'Whitey' Haines
- The Rescue (1988) as Cmdr. Howard
- The Great Escape II: The Untold Story (1988, TV movie) as Sgt. MacKenzie
- The Revenge of Al Capone (1989, TV movie) as Alex Connors
- Fire and Rain (1989, TV movie as Bob Sonnamaker)
- Nightbreed (1990) as Captain Eigerman
- The Dreamer of Oz: The L. Frank Baum Story (1990, TV movie) as Al Badham / Cowardly Lion
- Storyville (1992) as Abe Choate
- For Their Own Good (1993) as Hank
- Iron Will (1994) (director only)
- Riders of the Purple Sage (1996) (Director only)
- NYPD Blue - "Good Time Charlie" (1994) as Charli
- Home on the Range (2004) as Lucky Jack (voice)
- Sensitivity Training (2016) as Glenn
