= 54 Below =

Cabaret and restaurant in New York City

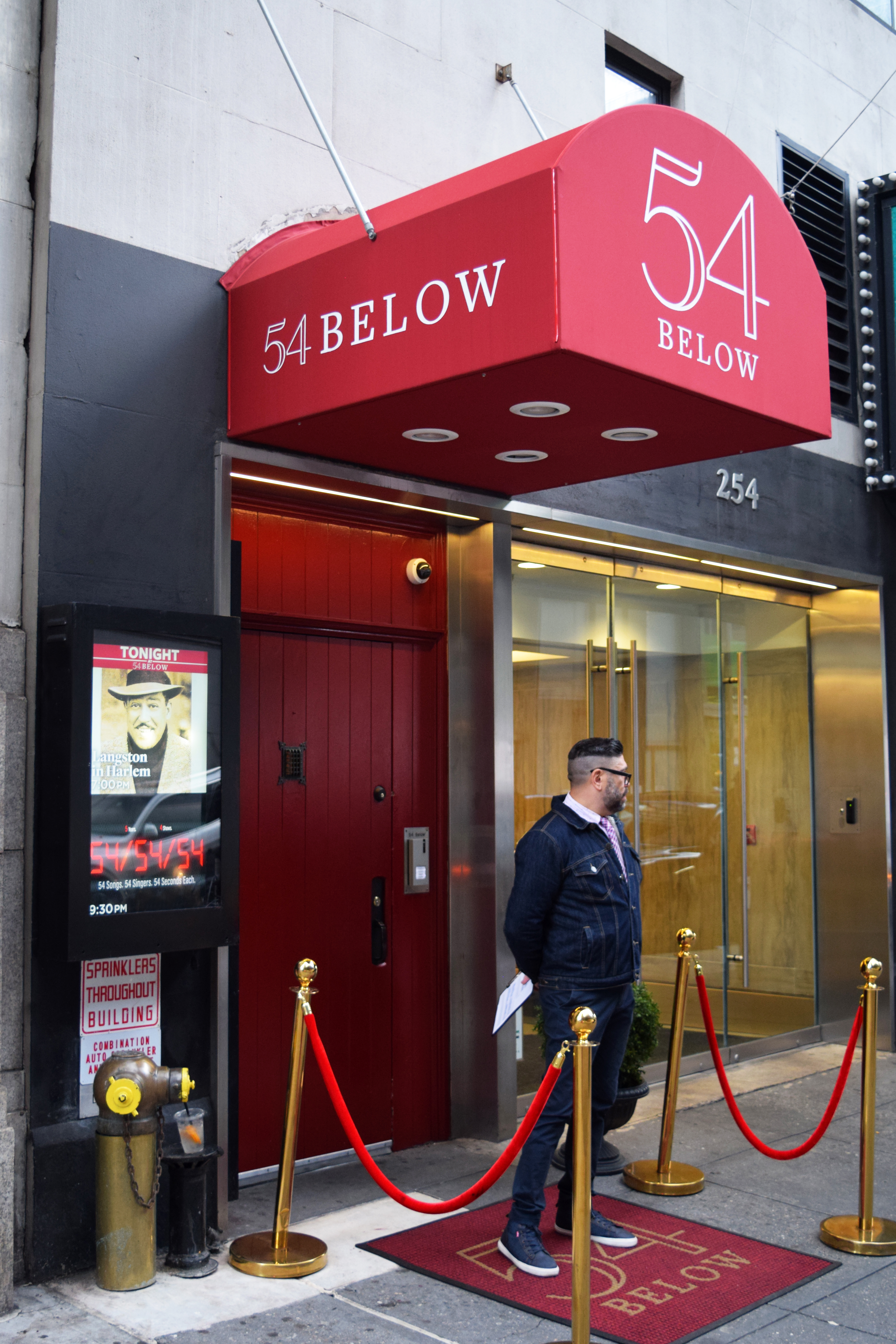
- Interactive map of 54 Below
- Former names: Feinstein's/54 Below (2015-2022)
- Address: 254 W 54 St, Cellar; New York City; United States
- Coordinates: 40°45′52″N 73°59′1.3″W
- Owner: Steve Baruch, Richard Frankel, Marc Routh, Tom Viertel
- Capacity: 147
- Type: Cabaret

Construction
- Opened: June 3, 2012; 14 years ago
- Architect: Richard H. Lewis

Website
- 54below.org

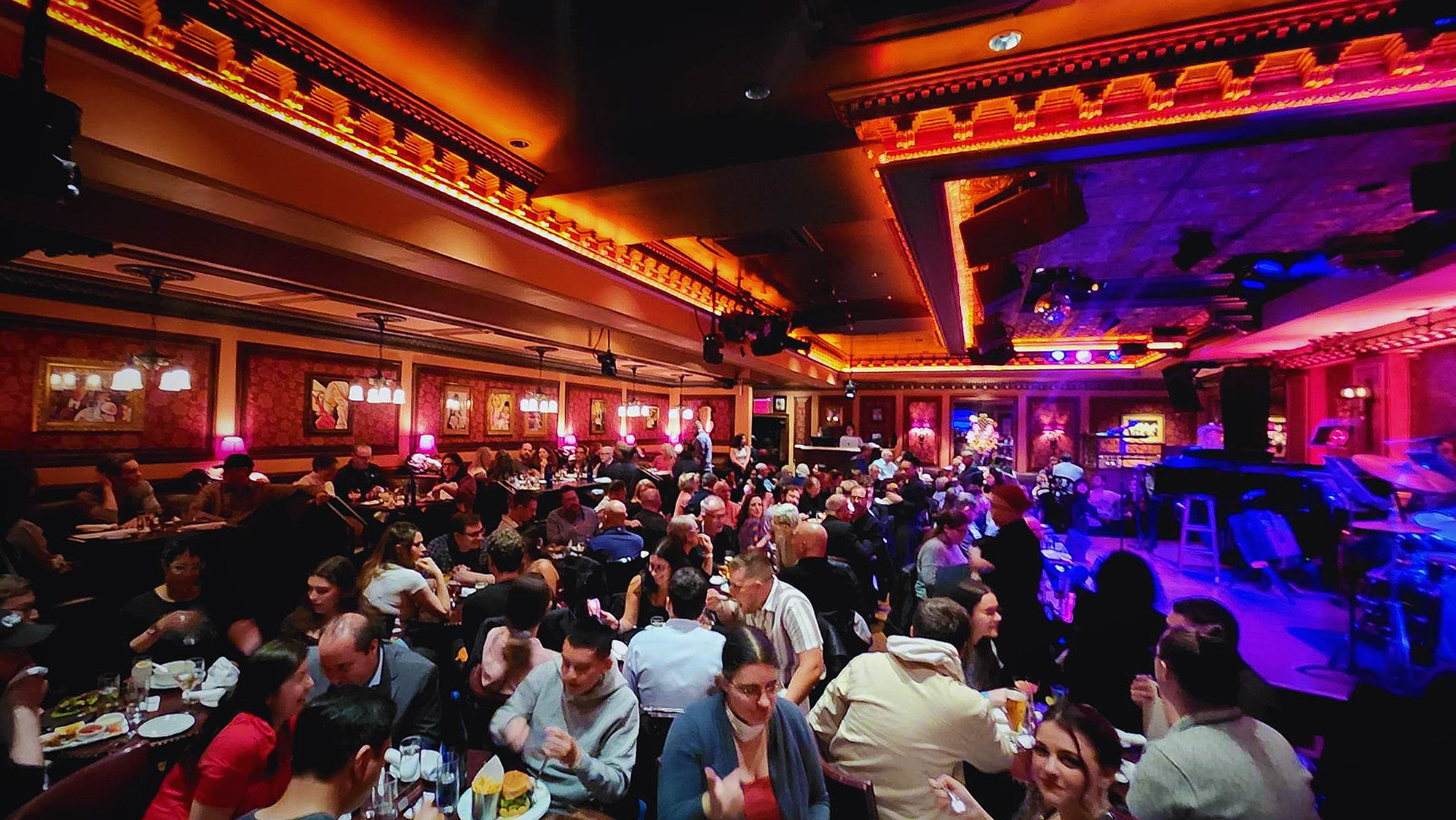
Interior of 54 Below

54 Below is a nonprofit cabaret and restaurant in the basement of Studio 54 in Midtown Manhattan, New York City. Run by Broadway producers Steve Baruch, Richard Frankel, Marc Routh, and Tom Viertel, 54 Below has hosted shows by such performers as Patti LuPone, Ben Vereen, Sierra Boggess, Peggy King, Lea Salonga, Marilyn Maye, Luann de Lesseps, Ramin Karimloo and Barbara Cook.

== History ==
54 Below opened on June 3, 2012. Its designers include architect Richard H. Lewis, set designer John Lee Beatty, lighting designer Ken Billington, and sound designer Peter Hylenski. Scott Wittman also serves as Creative Consultant. Jennifer Ashley Tepper serves as the Director of Programming at 54 Below.

54 Below features a variety of musical artists and styles, including musical theatre, opera, and jazz, the last of which was featured in a series co-produced with WBGO.

In September 2015, 54 Below announced a creative alliance with performer and singer, pianist, and music revivalist Michael Feinstein, becoming Feinstein's/54 Below. This partnership ended in July 2022, and the club reverted to the name 54 Below.

At the 75th Tony Awards 54 Below was the recipient of a 2022 Tony Awards Honor for Excellence in the Theatre.

As of 2023, 54 Below had become a nonprofit organization.

== Awards ==
- 2013 BroadwayWorld New York Cabaret Award
  - Patti LuPone: Show of the Year (Coulda, Woulda, Shoulda)
  - Sondheim Unplugged: Best Variety Show/Recurring Series
  - Terri White: Best One-Show Special Event (Blues to Broadway)
  - Alex Rybeck: Best Musical Director for Sibling Revelry with the Callaway Sisters
  - Jackie Hoffman: Best Musical Comedy Performance (Old Woman, New Material)
  - Laura Benanti: Best Female Celebrity Vocalist (In Constant Search of the Right Kind of Attention)
  - Susie Mosher: Best Host/Producer for Variety Show or Open Mic (Backstage)
  - Ann Hampton Callaway & Liz Callaway: Best Duo or Group Show (Sibling Revelry)
  - Ahrens & Flaherty: Best Revue (Nice Fighting You: A 30th Anniversary Celebration)
  - Jason Robert Brown: Best Original Song for a Cabaret Show ("Twenty-Six Names")
  - Jane Monheit: Best Jazz Vocalist
- 2013 Bistro Awards
  - Justin Vivian Bond
  - Jenifer Lewis
  - Maurice Hines
- 2013 June Briggs Award: Excellence in Destination Management Services
- 2013 Concierge Choice Award: Nightlife
- MAC Awards: Board of Directors Award (2013)
- 2013 Nightlife Award

== Selected performers ==
Among the performers who have performed at 54 Below:

- Krystina Alabado
- Taylor Trensch
- Nick Adams
- Lynn Ahrens
- Scott Alan
- Christy Altomare
- Christine Andreas
- Flo Ankah
- Joey Arias
- Annaleigh Ashford
- Samantha Barks
- Brent Barrett
- Roger Bart
- Britani Bateman
- Bryan Batt
- Laura Benanti
- Melissa Benoist
- Stephanie J. Block
- Sierra Boggess
- Justin Vivian Bond
- Alex Boniello
- Christian Borle
- Daniel Breaker
- Ashley Brown
- Jason Robert Brown
- David Burtka
- Charles Busch
- Kerry Butler
- Norbert Leo Butz
- Ann Hampton Callaway
- Liz Callaway
- Len Cariou
- Barbara Carroll
- Charles Castronovo
- Nick Cearley
- Kevin Chamberlin
- Antonio Cipriano
- Anat Cohen
- Joshua Colley
- Barbara Cook
- Ben Cook
- Gavin Creel
- Juan Pablo Di Pace
- Jennifer Damiano
- Jeff Daniels
- Tony Danza
- Robin de Jesús
- Diana DeGarmo
- Joyce DeWitt
- Micky Dolenz
- Matt Doyle
- Paquito D'Rivera
- Christine Ebersole
- Linda Eder
- Kerry Ellis
- Melissa Errico
- Eden Espinosa
- Andrew Barth Feldman
- Tovah Feldshuh
- Fyvush Finkel
- Stephen Flaherty
- Santino Fontana
- Victor Garber
- Drew Gasparini
- Larry Gatlin
- Joanna Gleason
- Annie Golden
- Randy Graff
- Sean Grandillo
- Josh Grisetti
- Jonathan Groff
- Justin Guarini
- Adam Guettel
- Lena Hall
- Joshua Henry
- Maurice Hines
- Mimi Hines
- Jackie Hoffman
- Jennifer Holliday
- Dee Hoty
- Cady Huffman
- James Monroe Iglehart
- Brian d'Arcy James
- Nikki M. James
- Shirley Jones
- Jeremy Jordan
- Andy Karl
- Judy Kaye
- Lainie Kazan
- Steve Kazee
- Laura Michelle Kelly
- Roslyn Kind
- Derek Klena
- Jane Krakowski
- Ryan Knowles
- LaChanze
- Linda Lavin
- Aaron Lazar
- Beth Leavel
- Michelle Lee
- Ute Lemper
- Telly Leung
- Peter Lerangis
- Zachary Levi
- Caissie Levy
- Jenifer Lewis
- Norm Lewis
- Casey Likes
- Kara Lindsay
- Andrew Lippa
- Taylor Louderman
- Rebecca Luker
- Jane Lynch
- Gloria Lynne
- Lorna Luft
- Patti LuPone
- Melissa Manchester
- Bianca Marroquín
- Alli Mauzey
- Marilyn Maye
- Marin Mazzie
- Andrea McArdle
- Rob McClure
- Maureen McGovern
- Nellie McKay
- Donna McKechnie
- Austin P. McKenzie
- Lindsay Mendez
- Alan Menken
- Andy Mientus
- Bonnie Milligan
- Tim Minchin
- Lin-Manuel Miranda
- Brian Stokes Mitchell
- Lauren Molina
- Jane Monheit
- Liliane Montevecchi
- Matthew Morrison
- Julia Murney
- Michael Musto
- Christiane Noll
- Renee Olstead
- Orfeh
- Brad Oscar
- Laura Osnes
- Hugh Panaro
- Adam Pascal
- Vincent Pastore
- Bucky Pizzarelli
- Ben Platt
- Eve Plumb
- Isaac Cole Powell
- Faith Prince
- Patricia Racette
- Andrew Rannells
- Anthony Rapp
- Reneé Rapp
- Lee Roy Reams
- Vivian Reed
- Gloria Reuben
- Molly Ringwald
- Alice Ripley
- Chita Rivera
- Krysta Rodriguez
- Will Roland
- Rita Rudner
- Frances Ruffelle
- Seth Rudetsky
- Roz Ryan
- Lea Salonga
- Brett Davis
- Chris McCarrell
- Cécile McLorin Salvant
- George Salazar
- Stephen Schwartz
- Milly Shapiro
- Duncan Sheik
- Vonda Shepard
- Erwin Schrott
- Sherie Rene Scott
- Christopher Sieber
- Janis Siegel
- Emily Skinner
- Rex Smith
- Dee Snider
- Jarrod Spector
- Team Starkid
- Sting
- Stew
- Paulo Szot
- John Tartaglia
- TastiSkank (Kate Reinders & Sarah Litzsinger)
- Brianna Thomas
- Tracie Thoms
- Kathleen Turner
- Aaron Tveit
- Leslie Uggams
- Cristina Vee
- Brandon Uranowitz
- Ben Vereen
- Willemijn Verkaik
- Bruce Vilanch
- Sherry Vine
- Donna Vivino
- Jessica Vosk
- Jim Walton
- Annette Warren
- Frank Wildhorn
- Rita Wilson
- Tom Wopat
- Lauren Worsham
- Tony Yazbeck
- Ace Young
- John Lloyd Young
- George Salazar

== Popular culture ==
54 Below was used in the setting of the Downton Abbey parody Downton Abbey the Musical.

It was also featured in the third season of the webseries Submissions Only.

== Recordings ==
A partnership with Broadway Records has produced live albums of selected shows performed at 54 Below.
