= Weekend War =

- Genre: Action; Adventure; War
- Written by: Dennis Hackin; Steven Hackin; Gregory Widen
- Directed by: Steven Hilliard Stern
- Starring: Stephen Collins; Daniel Stern; Evan Mirand
- Music by: Brad Fiedel
- Country of origin: United States
- Original language: English

Production
- Executive producers: Gil Atamian; Paul Pompian
- Producer: Paul Pompian
- Production locations: Arecibo, Puerto Rico; Loiza, Puerto Rico
- Cinematography: King Baggot
- Editor: Barrett Taylor
- Running time: 90 minutes
- Production companies: Pompian-Atamian Productions; Columbia Pictures Television

Original release
- Network: ABC
- Release: February 1, 1988

Weekend War is a made-for-television action adventure war film directed by Steven Hilliard Stern and starring Daniel Stern and Stephen Collins. Written by brothers Dennis and Steven Hackin, it premiered on the ABC network on Monday February 1, 1988.

== Plot ==
The plot concerns a rag-tag group of U.S. Army reservists who are deployed to Honduras to build a runway. After an intervention by the U.S. Embassy, the crew are then sent to a dangerous nearby village to repair a bridge. The title comes from one particular character's death scene, wherein he remarks, "Two tours in 'Nam I never get hit. This is a lousy weekend war!"

== Cast ==
- Stephen Collins as Capt. John Deason
- Daniel Stern as Dr. David Garfield
- Evan Mirand as Dulcy
- Michael Beach as Wiley
- Scott Paulin as Rudd
- James Tolkan as Dr. Alex Thompson
- Victor Mohica
- Kidany Lugo
- Charles Haid as Sgt. Kupjack
- Christine Healy as Elaine Garfield
- Charles Kimbrough as Father Leary
- Judith Baldwin as Kristen
- Joey Carrasco as Rowan

== Reception ==
Actor Charles Haid called this film Stephen Collins' best performance ever in an interview with The Washington Post. He enjoyed working on the film, saying: "We shot it for 20 days in a jungle in the rain, under the sun, with bugs ... It was great. This time we got to say something. That's why I'm happy I did it: I am actually involved in a project that I believe in 100 percent."

== Home media ==
The film was released on VHS in 1992 by Columbia Tristar Home Video.

== See also ==
List of television films produced for American Broadcasting Company
