= Kathleen Clark =

American playwright

- Citizenship: American
- Occupation: Playwright
- Spouse: Richard Frankel

Kathleen (Kate) Clark is an American playwright whose plays include Southern Comforts, In the Mood, Secrets of a Soccer Mom, Banner, Let's Live A Little and What We May Be. What We May Be, "a perfectly lovely, charming evening of theatre," "a delightful look at what's important in life", directed by Gregg Edelman, was produced on the Fitzpatrick Main Stage of the Berkshire Theatre Group. Her new play, entitled, Good Morning, Good Mother, had a recent reading with Dee Hoty and Linda Benanti. See Kathleenclarkplaywright.com

Raised in Mine Hill Township, New Jersey, Clark attended Dover High School and currently lives in Leonia, New Jersey.

Her play Southern Comforts, directed by Judith Ivey and starring Penny Fuller and Larry Keith, was produced at Primary Stages in NYC following a production at the Coconut Grove Playhouse with Dixie Carter and Hal Holbrook. Numerous regional productions of Southern Comforts followed, including Theatre Works in Palo Alto, the International City Theatre and Falcon Theatre with Michael Learned. Secrets Of A Soccer Mom, directed by Judith Ivey, was produced off Broadway and has since been produced throughout the U.S. Southern Comforts was a finalist for the Susan Smith Blackburn Award. Her play In The Mood was produced at the Berkshire Theatre Group on the Fitzpatrick Main Stage, directed by Marc Bruni.Let's Live A Little and The March, a play commemorating the 2017 Women's March, were presented at the Invisible Theatre.

Clark was twice selected to attend the Eugene O'Neill National Playwright Conference with her plays Southern Comforts and Banner. Her play Awilda was a semifinalist for the O'Neill National Playwrights Conference, is a finalist for the Southwest Theatre Production competition and had a reading at the Berkshire Theatre Festival directed by Jayne Atkinson. Clark's play The Way We Dance had readings at the NJ Repertory Theatre and in NYC directed by Marsha Mason with original music by Danny Abosch. Other reading series development work includes Williamstown Theatre Festival, New York Stage & Film, Manhattan Theatre Club and the LA Center Theatre Group. She is published by Concord Theatricals and is represented by Jack Tantleff at Paradigm. As a teaching artist, she was on the faculty of the MFA Writing for Stage and Screen low residency program at the New Hampshire Institute of Art. and is currently on the faculty of the low residency MFA Creative Writing/Dramatic Writing program at Fairfield University. Clark is married to theatrical producer and founder/Managing Director of 54 Below Richard Frankel.
