= Paddington: The Musical =

2025 musical by Tom Fletcher & Jessica Swale

Paddington
- The Musical
- West End promotional poster
- Music: Tom Fletcher
- Lyrics: Tom Fletcher
- Book: Jessica Swale
- Basis: A Bear Called Paddington by Michael Bond; Paddington by StudioCanal
- Premiere: 1 November 2025: Savoy Theatre, London
- Productions: 2025 West End
- Awards: Laurence Olivier Award for Best New Musical

Paddington: The Musical is a musical with music and lyrics by Tom Fletcher and a book by Jessica Swale. It is based on the 1958 children's book A Bear Called Paddington by Michael Bond and the 2014 film Paddington distributed by StudioCanal. It is the second stage adaptation of the book series, following the 1983 musical Paddington Bear's Magical Musical by Shirlie Roden.

The musical premiered in previews at the Savoy Theatre in London's West End on 1 November 2025 and officially opened on 30 November 2025. It will premiere on Broadway in 2027 at the Al Hirschfeld Theatre. In 2027, the production will also be transferring to Sydney where it will premiere at the Capitol Theatre.

== Background ==
The musical is based around the character Paddington Bear, first created by Michael Bond for the 1958 novel A Bear Called Paddington. Adapted from the novel and the 2014 film Paddington, it has a book by Jessica Swale.

The musical was directed by Luke Sheppard and developed by Sonia Friedman Productions, StudioCanal and Eliza Lumley Productions on behalf of Universal Music UK.

== Productions ==
=== West End (2025) ===
In April 2025, it was announced that Paddington: The Musical would receive its world premiere in the West End at the Savoy Theatre from 1 November 2025. On 21 August 2025, the initial casting and creative team were announced, with the exception of Paddington, which was to be revealed during the first preview. During the first preview, it was announced that Arti Shah and James Hameed play the role of Paddington with Shah as the on-stage performer (with Abbie Purvis and Ali Sarebani as alternates and Hassan Taj as an understudy) with Hameed performing as the voice and controlling Paddington's facial expressions, whilst also playing the role of Young Man. It officially opened on 30 November 2025. The show made history at the WhatsOnStage Awards, receiving fifteen nominations (winning nine including Best New Musical) and received eleven nominations at the Laurence Olivier Awards (winning seven including three acting awards for Hameed & Shah, Edden and Hamilton-Barritt and Best New Musical).

=== Broadway (2027) ===
The production was announced to transfer to Broadway in 2027 at the Al Hirschfeld Theatre, with previews beginning on March 30 and an opening on April 18. Produced by Sonia Friedman Productions, Studiocanal and Eliza Lumley Productions, Luke Sheppard will serve as director.

In November 2026 it was announced that James Hameed and Arti Shah would reprise their respective Olivier Award winning roles of Paddington/Young Man both making their Broadway debut. The principal cast members also includes Tony Hale, Drew Gehling, Jessie Mueller and Leslie Rodriguez Kritzer. Additional cast members will be detailed below.

=== Sydney (2027) ===
An Australian production was announced to transfer to Sydney in 2027, where it will premiere at the Capitol Theatre in September.

== Cast and characters ==
Characters	West End	Broadway
Characters	2025	2027
Young Man / Paddington (Voice/Remote Puppeteer)	James Hameed	James Hameed
Paddington (on-stage)	Arti Shah	Arti Shah
Mrs. Brown	Amy Ellen Richardson	Jessie Mueller
Mr. Brown	Adrian Der Gregorian	Drew Gehling
Judy Brown	Delilah Bennett-Cardy	Serena Parrish
Jonathan Brown	Joseph Bramley Leo Collon Stevie Hare Jasper Rowse	TBA
Millicent Clyde	Victoria Hamilton-Barritt	Leslie Rodriguez Kritzer
Mrs. Bird	Bonnie Langford	Karen Ziemba
Mr. Gruber/ The Explorer	Teddy Kempner	Chip Zien
Mr. Curry	Tom Edden	Tony Hale
Grant	Tarinn Callender	J. Quinton Johnson
Lady Sloane/ Mrs. Hachoo/ Train Announcer	Amy Booth-Steel	Allison Guinn
Tanya/Voice of Aunt Lucy	Brenda Edwards	Zonya Love
Tony	Timi Akinyosade	Kelvin Dukes
Hank the Pigeon	Ben Redfern	TBA

=== Notable Replacements ===
==== West End ====
- Mrs. Brown - Charlotte Wakefield
- Millicent Clyde - Cassidy Janson
- Mrs. Bird - Linzi Hateley
- Mr. Curry - Marc Pickering

== Synopsis ==
=== Act One ===
Mr. Gruber opens his shop of curiosities, and a young man enters, fascinated by a stuffed bear. Mr. Gruber recounts the story behind the bear, and its perilous journey from Peru ("Overture / Mr. Gruber's Curiosities"). Paddington arrives in London, England and looks for a home after Aunt Lucy moves to a home for retired bears as the Browns arrive home from a camping trip. Mrs. Brown sees Paddington and offers to house him for the night while they look for someone to look after him ("I've Arrived"). However, Mr. Curry forbids them from taking the bear home, citing the Taxi Driver's Code. Jonathan corrects him, and Mr. Curry allows them to take Paddington home ("The Taxi Driver's Code"). Upon arriving home, Paddington meets their lodger, Mrs. Bird, and begins curiously exploring the house, destroying nearly everything he touches. The Browns try to stop him ("Don't Touch That"). Paddington reveals an explorer (the one who gave his uncle his iconic red hat) promised him a home, but he does not know his name. Mrs. Brown takes Paddington up to the attic for bed and shows him her comic book drawings, expressing her desire for the family to go on more adventures together ("One Page at a Time").

At the Natural History Museum, local explorer Millicent Clyde, adds a chinchilla to her taxidermy collection, while lamenting over the almost-complete collection. She is only missing a Peruvian Bear. Her assistant, Grant, reveals that Paddington, a Peruvian spectacled bear has moved into Windsor Gardens. Millicent vows to kill Paddington and add him to her collection ("Pretty Little Dead Things").

While preparing to visit Mr. Gruber's shop to identify the red hat's origins, Mrs. Bird gives Paddington Mr. Brown's old coat. Judy's boyfriend, Tony, and his mum, Tanya, introduce Paddington to the wonders of London life ("The Rhythm of London"). Meanwhile, Millicent investigates Windsor Gardens; Mr. Curry, instantly smitten, agrees to help her capture Paddington.

Mr. Gruber identifies the hat as originating at the Geographer's Guild, and reassures Paddington that his new life will take some time to adjust to ("Mr. Gruber's Shop"). The Browns and Paddington arrive at the Geographers Guild and are greeted by Lady Sloane, who is extremely rude. Paddington gives her a hard stare and she changes her mind, allowing him to visit the archives. Millicent; revealed to be the explorer's daughter and Grant also visit the Guild in search of the Peruvian archive ("Hard Stare"). After discovering the explorer's full name is Montgomery Clyde, Paddington imagines his new life living with Montgomery ("The Explorer and the Bear").

The Browns and Paddington visit the Savoy for Mr. Brown's work, where Mr. Brown hopes to be promoted. Millicent, Grant, and Mr. Curry infiltrate the event disguised as staff. Mr. Brown sings a rock song dedicated to Mrs. Brown, impressing everyone, but Paddington is baited with marmalade by Millicent, and causes an explosion after tripping over the machinery, ruining the event and Mr. Brown's chances ("Risky Business"). Millicent tells Paddington she is the explorer's daughter and will welcome him over whenever he wants.

Mr. Brown loudly proclaims Paddington is the worst thing that ever happened to the family. He fears for the safety of Judy and Jonathan. Mrs. Brown insists Paddington has helped the family, not harmed it. Believing the Browns and Mrs. Bird would be better off without him, Paddington leaves a note and runs away to Millicent's house, where she is waiting to kill and stuff him ("One of Us").

=== Act Two ===
Millicent has Mr. Curry distract Paddington whilst she leaves to prepare to her work tools. Paddington shares his sandwich with Mr. Curry and introduces him to marmalade ("Marmalade"), and Mr. Curry is moved by his kindness. Millicent returns to bring Paddington to the Natural History Museum, causing Mr. Curry to realize her true intentions. She places a shock collar on Mr. Curry to force him to continue to help.

At Windsor Gardens, the Brown family discovers that Mrs. Brown has left in search of Paddington. Judy and Jonathan want to look for Paddington too, but Mr. Brown refuses to risk their safety and sends them to bed. Mrs. Bird comforts Mr. Brown with the story of her deceased husband, and reassures him that love is difficult, but worth it ("Worth the Work"). Mr. Brown wakes the children to find Mrs. Brown and Paddington. Mrs. Brown, with the help of Mr. Gruber, Tony, and Tanya, spreads missing posters around London ("Where's Paddington"). Mr. Curry finds a poster and tells the Brown family of Millicent's plans.

At the Natural History Museum, Millicent informs Paddington of her father's death and her true intentions. She calls Lady Sloane and summons the Geographer's Guild before preparing her equipment, declaring that she will surpass her father ("Everything You Never Were"). Paddington sees her mistreating Grant and comforts him, but Grant dismisses Paddington and leaves to keep watch.

The Brown family and Mrs. Bird arrive at the museum, but are deterred by Grant. Mrs. Bird distracts Grant by inspiring him to follow his dreams ("It's Never Too Late Pt. 1"). Grant contemplates what Mrs. Bird says and he shuts off the power to stall Millicent ("It's Never Too Late Pt. 2"). A despondent Paddington imagines himself back in the jungle in Peru with Aunt Lucy ("Aunt Lucy's Prayer"), and his cries are heard by Judy who communicates to him via bear. Judy and Mrs. Brown mend their relationship, whilst Jonathan helps Mr. Brown overcome his fears.

Lady Sloane and the Geographer's Guild gloat about their practice of stealing artefacts from other countries for Britain ("The Geographer's Guild") as they head to the museum.

The Browns reunite and resolve to save Paddington as a family. Meanwhile, Millicent prepares to kill and stuff Paddington ("Unstoppable"). She and Padington are eventually cornered by the Browns, supported by Mrs. Bird, Tony, Tanya, Grant, Mr. Curry, Mr. Gruber, and Hank the Pigeon, on the roof of the Natural History Museum. Mr. Brown displays an emotional declaration of love for Paddington. The Browns beg Millicent to release him. She refuses and shoots Paddington with her crossbow, cursing the memory of her father and blaming him for her actions. Paddington plays dead and the gang assumes that he died. Everyone expresses the impact Paddington has had on their lives and a flock of pigeons attack Millicent and push her off the roof. Millicent grabs a flag pole just in time and her life is spared. Paddington is found to be alive and unharmed, as the arrow was stopped by Mr. Gruber's soap tin ("Everything You Never Were (Reprise)"). The Geographer's Guild arrives to collect Paddington, but they are deterred after Paddington points out the issues of their organization. An injured Millicent is arrested and placed in Mr. Curry's custody, ironically as a pigeon caretaker. The Browns and Mrs. Bird return home with Paddington to 32 Windsor Gardens as a family. Mr. Gruber finishes his story to the young man ("Worth the Work (Reprise) / Mr. Gruber's Shop (Reprise)").

After the story is finished Tony then invites Mr. Gruber to a party, where everyone celebrates Paddington's presence in London ("Missing Beat"). The Brown family receive a letter from Aunt Lucy, who thanks them for giving her nephew a loving home ("Dear Family").

== Musical numbers ==
Act I

- "Overture / Mr. Gruber's Curiosities" – The Paddington Band & Mr. Gruber
- "I've Arrived" – Paddington & Ensemble
- "The Taxi Driver's Code" – Mr. Curry & Jonathan Brown
- "Don't Touch That" – The Brown Family & Paddington
- "One Page at a Time" – Mrs. Brown
- "Pretty Little Dead Things" – Millicent Clyde, Grant & Ensemble
- "The Rhythm of London" – Tony, Tanya & Ensemble
- "Hard Stare" – Paddington, Millicent Clyde, Judy Brown & Ensemble
- "The Explorer and the Bear" – Paddington
- "Risky Business" – Mr. Brown & Ensemble
- "One of Us" – Mrs. Brown, Paddington & Ensemble

Act II

- "Entr'acte" – The Paddington Band
- "Marmalade" – Paddington, Mr. Curry & Ensemble
- "Worth the Work" – Mr. Brown & Mrs. Bird
- "Where's Paddington" – The Brown Family, Mr. Gruber, Tony, Tanya & Ensemble
- "Everything You Never Were" – Millicent Clyde
- "It's Never Too Late Pt. 1" – Mrs. Bird & Grant
- "It's Never Too Late Pt. 2" - Mrs. Bird & Grant
- "Aunt Lucy's Prayer" – Paddington & Aunt Lucy
- "The Geographer's Guild" – Lady Sloane & Ensemble
- "Unstoppable" – The Brown Family, Millicent Clyde, Mrs. Bird & Company
- "Everything You Never Were (Reprise)" – Millicent Clyde, Paddington, The Brown Family, Mrs. Bird, Mr. Curry, Tanya, Grant, Hank the Pigeon, & Ensemble
- "Worth the Work (Reprise) / Mr. Gruber's Shop (Reprise)" – Paddington, The Brown Family, Mrs. Bird & Mr. Gruber
- "Missing Beat" – Company
- "Dear Family" – Paddington, Aunt Lucy, Mrs. Brown & Ensemble

=== Recordings ===
Prior to the musical commencing previews the song "The Explorer and the Bear", performed by Tom Fletcher, and "Pretty Little Dead Things", performed by Victoria Hamilton-Barritt were released by Decca Records.

Recorded at Abbey Road Studios the cast recording was due to be released in March 2026, by Decca Records but was delayed. The album was ultimately released digitally on 10 April 2026, with a physical vinyl and CD release in May.

=== Track listing ===
Paddington The Musical (Original Cast Recording)

Cast recording by Various artists
- Released: 10 April 2026
- Length: 80:03
- Label: Decca

Paddington The Musical (Original Cast Recording) track listing
No.	Title	Length
1.	"Overture / Mr Gruber's Curiosities"	3:02
2.	"I've Arrived"	7:09
3.	"The Taxi Driver's Code"	1:27
4.	"Don't Touch That"	3:34
5.	"One Page at a Time"	3:38
6.	"Pretty Little Dead Things"	4:00
7.	"The Rhythm of London"	4:39
8.	"Mr. Gruber's Shop"	2:35
9.	"Hard Stare"	3:15
10.	"The Explorer & the Bear"	3:51
11.	"Risky Business"	2:46
12.	"One of Us"	3:49
13.	"Entr'acte"	0:48
14.	"Marmalade"	3:47
15.	"Worth the Work"	2:48
16.	"Where's Paddington"	4:03
17.	"Everything You Never Were"	4:06
18.	"It's Never Too Late Pt. 1"	3:15
19.	"It's Never Too Late Pt. 2"	1:32
20.	"Aunt Lucy's Prayer"	3:06
21.	"The Geographer's Guild"	2:38
22.	"Unstoppable"	2:07
23.	"Everything You Never Were (Reprise)"	4:03
24.	"Worth the Work (Reprise) / Mr. Gruber's Shop (Reprise)"	1:55
25.	"Missing Beat"	3:16
26.	"Dear Family"	2:10

== Critical reception ==
The West End production received nearly universal positive acclaim from the critics.

=== Charts ===
==== Weekly charts ====
Weekly chart performance for Paddington: The Musical
Chart (2026)	Peak position
UK Compilation Albums (Official Charts)	1

== Awards and nominations ==
=== 2025 London production ===
Year	Award	Category	Nominee	Result
2026	Laurence Olivier Awards	Best New Musical	Tom Fletcher (music & lyrics), Jessica Swale (book)	Won
2026	Laurence Olivier Awards	Best Actor in a Musical	James Hameed and Arti Shah	Won
2026	Laurence Olivier Awards	Best Actor in a Supporting Role in a Musical	Tom Edden	Won
2026	Laurence Olivier Awards	Best Actress in a Supporting Role in a Musical	Amy Booth-Steel	Nominated
2026	Laurence Olivier Awards	Best Actress in a Supporting Role in a Musical	Victoria Hamilton-Barritt	Won
2026	Laurence Olivier Awards	Best Director	Luke Sheppard	Won
2026	Laurence Olivier Awards	Best Sound Design	Gareth Owen	Nominated
2026	Laurence Olivier Awards	Best Set Design	Tom Pye (set design), Ash J Woodward (video design)	Won
2026	Laurence Olivier Awards	Best Costume Design	Gabriella Slade (costume design), Tahra Zafar (Paddington design)	Won
2026	Laurence Olivier Awards	Best Theatre Choreographer	Ellen Kane	Nominated
2026	Laurence Olivier Awards	Outstanding Musical Contribution	Matt Brind (Orchestrations & Arrangements)	Nominated
2026	WhatsOnStage Awards	Best New Musical	Tom Fletcher & Jessica Swale	Won
2026	WhatsOnStage Awards	Best Performer in a Musical	James Hameed & Arti Shah	Nominated
2026	WhatsOnStage Awards	Best Supporting Performer in a Musical	Victoria Hamilton-Barritt	Nominated
2026	WhatsOnStage Awards	Best Direction	Luke Sheppard	Won
2026	WhatsOnStage Awards	Best Sound Design	Gareth Owen	Won
2026	WhatsOnStage Awards	Best Set Design	Tom Pye	Won
2026	WhatsOnStage Awards	Best Video Design	Ash J Woodward	Nominated
2026	WhatsOnStage Awards	Best Costume Design	Gabriella Slade & Tahra Zafar	Won
2026	WhatsOnStage Awards	Best Wigs, Hair And Make-Up Design	Campbell Young Associates	Won
2026	WhatsOnStage Awards	Best Professional Debut	Timi Akinyosade	Won
2026	WhatsOnStage Awards	Best Casting Direction	Natalie Gallacher, Nick Hockaday & Annabelle Davis	Won
2026	WhatsOnStage Awards	Best Choreography	Ellen Kane	Nominated
2026	WhatsOnStage Awards	Best Musical Direction/Supervision	Matt Brind	Won
2026	Critics Circle Theatre Awards	Best New Musical		Won
2026	Critics Circle Theatre Awards	Best Direction	Luke Sheppard	Nominated
2026	Critics Circle Theatre Awards	Best Actor	James Hameed & Arti Shah	Nominated
2026	Critics Circle Theatre Awards	Best Designer	Tom Pye	Nominated
