= Dennis Hackin =

American screenwriter and producer

- Born: United States
- Occupations: Screenwriter, producer, author
- Notable work: Bronco Billy; Wanda Nevada

Dennis Hackin is an American screenwriter, producer and author best known for such films as Bronco Billy, Wanda Nevada, No Holds Barred and South of Heaven, West of Hell.

Hackin has also written such projects as Weekend War for television.

== Bronco Billy The Musical ==
Hackin also wrote the book for the musical version of Bronco Billy The Musical. It made its world premiere at the Skylight Theatre Company in Los Angeles on May 18, 2019 (with previews from May 10) running until July 21. The production was directed by Hunter Bird.

Bronco Bill The Musical had its UK premiere at the Charing Cross Theatre in Off West End, London opening 24 January for a limited run until 7 April 2024. It was directed by Hunter Bird and starred Emily Benjamin as Antoinette Lily and Tarinn Callender as Bronco Billy. In a UK review for the musical, The Stage wrote "Hackin's script is an uplifting, screwball comedy that is as charming as it is witty."
