= Julia Jordan =

American playwright, television writer, and screenwriter

Julia Jordan is an American playwright, television writer, and screenwriter. She is a graduate of Barnard College, class of 1989, and received a master's degree from Trinity College Dublin.

== Biography ==
Jordan was born in Chicago and spent much of her early life in Minnesota. Later, she would settle in New York City to pursue a life as a painter. However, this did not come to fruition. Upon graduating college, she briefly worked as a CNN copywriter. While attending Neighborhood Playhouse School of the Theater for acting, she was inspired to begin writing for the stage.

Several of Jordan's plays were staged during the late 1990s and early 2000s earning critical praise. In 2000, her short film "The Hat", which she co-directed with Terry Stacey, debuted at the Sundance Film Festival and subsequently ran on IFC in 2001–2002. Her second short, which she wrote and photographer Glen Luchford directed, won "Best Short Film" at the Jackson Hole Film Festival in 2008.

She is a Lortel Fellow, Juilliard Playwright Fellow, Manhattan Theater Club Fellow, Member of the Dramatists Guild of America Council and New Dramatists. Jordan is represented by The Gersh Agency.

Due to her achievements in theater, she was asked to participate in Barnard College's "Great Writers at Barnard" conference in 2006.

Jordan is a founder and the executive director of The Lillys, created in 2010 to honor female playwrights and address the shortage of plays by women that get produced in the United States.

== Plays ==
- MPLS, St Paul
- St Paul (1999)
- Nightswim (2002)
- St. Scarlet (2003)
- Summer Of The Swans (2003)
- Boy (2004)
- Tatjana in Color (2004)
- Dark Yellow (2006)
- Walk Two Moons
- Murder Ballad

== Filmography ==
=== Films ===
- 2000 The Hat

=== Television ===
- As The World Turns (script writer)

== Awards ==
- The Francesca Primus Prize for Tatjana in Color
- three times shortlisted for the Susan Smith Blackburn Award, one honorable mention
- Jonathan Larson Award
