= The Art of Doing =

2013 book by Camille Sweeney and Josh Gosfield

The Art of Doing: How Superachievers Do What They Do and How They Do It So Well
- Author: Camille Sweeney; Josh Gosfield
- Language: English
- Genre: Non-fiction
- Publisher: Plume
- Publication date: 2013
- Media type: Paperback
- Pages: 320
- ISBN: 978-0-452-29817-0

The Art of Doing: How Superachievers Do What They Do and How They Do It So Well is a 2013 non-fiction book by the journalist Camille Sweeney and the artist Josh Gosfield published by Plume Books, a division of Penguin Group on January 29, 2013.

The book features strategic principles that let to the achievements of over three-dozen highly successful individuals. For the book Sweeney and Gosfield interviewed an eclectic mix of people from the worlds of business, the arts, media, sports and other fields.

== Contents ==
In the book's introduction "What Superachievers Have in Common" Sweeney and Gosfield list ten traits they discovered that their interviewees shared: devotion, intelligent persistence, community building, listening, telling a story, testing, managing emotions, evolving, patience and happiness.

There are thirty-six chapters in the book. Each chapter focuses on a single or affiliated group of high achievers at the top of their fields. Each chapter includes a short biography and ten key strategies or principles that led to that achiever or achievers' success story. Sweeney and Gosfield describe their approach to the book not as "theorizing on success Gladwellian-style or offering up some easily digestible quick-tip formulae" but instead as, "going straight to the source and simply asking successful people how they do what they do."

== Recognition ==
The New York Times article by Sweeney and Gosfield "The Secret Ingredient of Success," based on their research was the second most emailed story on the Times site for the week. The Art of Doing has received coverage by NBC, MSNBC, Smithsonian, Yahoo!, Newsweek/Daily Beast, The Atlanta Journal Constitution, Fast Company, Psychology Today, Boing Boing, The Huffington Post, and BusinessInsider.
