= John Torres =

American musician

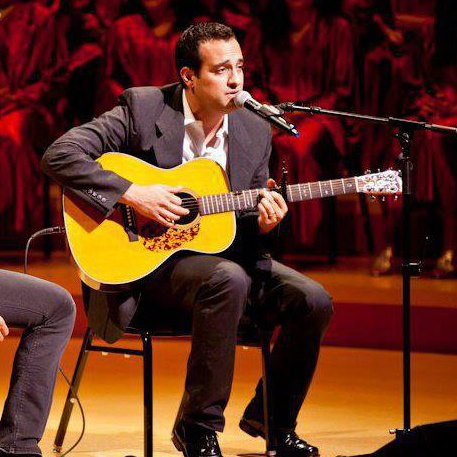
- Torres performing at Disney Concert Hall

Background information
- Origin: San Dimas, California, U.S.
- Genres: Rock; alternative rock; country; pop; folk; indie rock
- Occupations: Musician, songwriter, actor

John Torres is an American songwriter and recording artist from Los Angeles.

== Career ==
His music has been featured in popular films and television shows and has received numerous honors, including a John Lennon Songwriting Award, a nomination for an American Independent Music Award, and a short listing for Best Original Song by the Academy of Motion Picture Arts and Sciences. He has released four studio albums, as well as numerous singles and music videos.

Torres also was a composer for Bronco Billy The Musical.

As an actor, Torres played the lead role of Drew in the first production of the Broadway musical Rock of Ages. He also co-starred as Peter in the first major production of the musical Bare: A Pop Opera.

== Discography ==
=== Albums ===
- There There Album (2006)
- Music After All (2009)
- Live at the NoHo Brick House (2009)
- John Torres (2013)
