= Michele Brourman =

American composer and songwriter

- Born: April 12, 1947 (age 79); Pittsburgh, Pennsylvania, U.S.
- Occupations: Songwriter, composer

Michele Brourman (born April 12, 1947) is an American composer and songwriter who is known for writing the songs to most of the films in Land Before Time series (with Amanda McBroom), as well as the accompanying television series (with Ford Riley). Brourman has also written the songs for sequels Balto II: Wolf Quest and Balto III: Wings of Change and one song for the family film Shiloh.

== Early years ==
Brourman grew up in Pittsburgh, attending Taylor Allderdice High School. She told a newspaper reporter, "I was a Broadway brat. I had stacks of original-cast records and memorized the scores of every Broadway show." She majored in composition at Northwestern University and "was thoroughly trained in the classical piano".

== Stage ==
Brourman's Broadway credits include being dance composer for Working (1978). She also composed the music for the off-broadway musical in I Married Wyatt Earp, based on the book of the same name. The musical ran at the Bristol Riverside Theatre in Bucks County, Pennsylvania.

Brourman also worked as a lyricist on Bronco Billy The Musical.

== Personal appearances ==
Brourman has appeared in person both as an accompanist for artists, including Bob Dylan, Bernadette Peters and Dixie Carter, and as a performer "who sings in a tart pop-blues style reminiscent at times of Maria Muldaur."

== Recognition ==
Brourman won the Johnny Mercer Award for "Emerging American Songwriters." Her work Dangerous Beauty was one of eight new musicals selected to be presented at the 18th National Alliance for Musical Theatre Annual Festival of New Musicals in New York City in October 2006.
