= Flashdance (musical) =

- West End poster
- Music: Robbie Roth
- Lyrics: Robbie Roth & Robert Cary
- Book: Tom Hedley & Robert Cary
- Basis: Flashdance
- Productions: 2008 UK Tour; 2010 West End; 2012 US Tour; 2015 US Tour; 2017 UK Tour

Flashdance is a stage musical based on the 1983 film of the same name with a book by Tom Hedley and Robert Cary, music by Robbie Roth and lyrics by Roth and Cary. The show had its world premiere in 2008 at the Theatre Royal in Plymouth, as part of a ten-month UK tour, followed by a London West End run at the Shaftesbury Theatre.

The musical had a US tour in 2012–2014, but an expected Broadway run was postponed.

== Overview ==
Set in Pittsburgh, Pennsylvania, the show revolves around 18-year-old Alex, a welder by day and 'flashdancer' by night, and her dreams of attending the prestigious Shipley Dance Academy.

Based on the Paramount Pictures film (screenplay by Tom Hedley and Joe Eszterhas, story by Tom Hedley), the UK production described itself as "an unmistakably unique musical about holding onto your dreams and love against all the odds". The show includes hits "Maniac", "Manhunt", "Gloria", and the award-winning title track "Flashdance – What a Feeling".

== Synopsis ==
=== Act 1 ===
Pittsburgh, 1983. On the floor of Hurley Steel, young steelworker Alexandra ("Alex") Owens welds while waiting impatiently for her shift to end ("Steeltown Sky"). She's anxious to get to Harry's Bar, a small club where she performs innovative, fashion-driven dances. On the mill floor, she catches the eye of Nick Hurley, the son of the mill owner, who decides he wants to learn more about her.

En route to the club, Alex meets up with her friend Gloria, who encourages Alex to pursue her dream of becoming a trained dancer in a legitimate company by applying to audition for the renowned Shipley Academy. Alex decides to take the chance and asks the academy's administrator, Ms. Wilde, for an application ("It's All in Reach").

As Alex warms up to perform at Harry's, her good friends (and fellow dancers) Kiki, Tess and Gloria sing "Maniac". Alex steps onto the club stage, and she is captivating. After her performance, she is approached by Nick Hurley, but she rebuffs him, concerned about getting involved with her own boss. In the dressing room, her girlfriends can't believe she'd turn down someone as attractive as Nick, but Alex sticks to her guns. Gloria, who waits tables at Harry's but longs to perform, gets an education from the women in what inspires a "flashdance" ("Put It On"). But when the bar's owner, Harry, enters and complains that a new lap-dance joint called Chameleon — opened down the street by a shady entrepreneur named C.C. — is starting to siphon off his once-loyal customers, Alex realizes her days at Harry's may be numbered ("It's All in Reach" reprise).

Anxious about her audition, Alex talks to her mom, who bolsters Alex's confidence about getting into Shipley ("A Million to One"). Alex reports to Shipley for a preliminary audition, but she is quickly intimidated by the accomplished, trained dancers all around her ("Inside"). She rushes out, crestfallen. ("Steeltown Sky" - Reprise)

The next day, Nick approaches Alex in the steel mill's lunchroom, but once again she rejects his advances. Nick gets a playful jabbing from the steel men, who are happy to see him knocked off his pedestal ("Justice"). After they exit, he is approached by his secretary, who shows him a list of workers slated to be fired as the company starts to outsource its manufacturing. Nick's affection (and respect) for Alex put him in a tough spot ("Justice" reprise).

At Harry's Bar, Gloria is hit on by C.C., the owner of the Chameleon Club. Nick, who is waiting at the club for another chance to talk to Alex, fends C.C. off. Alex is impressed by Nick's chivalry and finally agrees to let him take her on a date. Gloria’s cousin Jimmy admits that he has plans to go to New York to make it as a stand-up comic. Tess takes the stage at Harry's to perform a rousing interpretation of "I Love Rock 'n' Roll."

Nick and Alex return to her place from their date and start to move past their assumptions about one another; she admits to her dream of attending Shipley, while he confesses that he is torn about the employees his family wants him to fire. They begin to fall in love ("Here and Now") and they sleep together for the first time.

A few weeks later, Alex goes to her mom, holding an envelope from the Shipley Academy, and opens it to discover she has been called back for a final audition ("My Next Step"). Meanwhile, C.C. lures Gloria into working at the Chameleon, while Nick visits Ms. Wilde to thank her for letting Alex have a callback—which he has paid for with a "contribution" to the academy. Blissfully unaware of all this, Alex steps onto Harry's stage and dances exuberantly, finishing with an iconic blast of water from above ("Maniac" reprise).

=== Act 2 ===
At the Chameleon Club, the girls perform lasciviously as Gloria — increasingly dependent on alcohol and cocaine — realizes she's gotten in too deep with C.C. ("Chameleon Girl").

Alex and Nick, now very much in love, head off to face the day's challenges ("Here and Now" reprise). Alex decides to forego attempting to dance classically for the judges in favor of something that expresses Alex's unique talent and style; Nick, meanwhile, prepares to plead his case against firing the steel workers ("My Turn").

Jimmy returns from New York, his dreams of becoming a famous stand-up comic quickly dashed. He asks Harry for his job back, and Harry, after some initial reluctance, agrees, glad to have Jimmy home ("Where I Belong").

Nick fails to convince his family they should hold onto the workers. When Alex discovers that many of her friends at the plant are getting laid off, she and Nick argue, causing him to inadvertently admit he arranged her callback at Shipley. Alex walks out on him in a fury, leaving Nick to question his place in the company and his path in life ("Enough").

Kiki performs a flashdance to "Manhunt", as Harry continues to worry about C.C.'s growing success. Alex, still upset from her fight with Nick and coping with learning the truth about her Shipley callback, discovers that Gloria — who she thought was away caring for a relative — has in fact been with C.C. at the Chameleon. She rashly decides to go to Chameleon, rescuing Gloria (with some last-minute chivalry from none other than Jimmy). Gloria and Jimmy reconcile ("Where I Belong" reprise).

Alex decides to leave Pittsburgh and return to the small town where she grew up, despite having no real prospects there. Nick appears and tries to dissuade her still ("Hang On"). She's insistent that their relationship has too many challenges to succeed. But when Alex discovers that her mom has been shot and killed during a robbery that Jimmy orchestrated, she finally confronts her own fears and makes the choice to reach for her dreams despite the odds ("Try").

Alex arrives at Shipley just in time to audition, and despite falling at the beginning, her remarkable dance dispels the judges' initial skepticism ("Flashdance — What a Feeling"). Alex is given a place in the new semester; Nick enters with flowers, and Alex, forgiving the past and certain that her acceptance was based on her true talent, presents him with a rose from the bouquet before embracing him joyously.

== Production history ==
=== 2008–2009 UK tour ===
The show had its world premiere on July 19, 2008, at the Theatre Royal in Plymouth, as part of a ten-month UK tour. The production was directed by Kenny Leon and choreographed by Arlene Phillips. The UK cast included Victoria Hamilton-Barritt as Alex Owens, Noel Sullivan as Nick Hurley, Bernie Nolan as Hannah Owens and Bruno Langley as Jimmy Kaminsky.

=== 2010–2011 West End ===
The 2010 West End production ran at the Shaftesbury Theatre from October 14, 2010, to January 15, 2011. Produced by Christopher Malcolm and David Ian, the show was directed by Nikolai Foster and choreographed by Phillips. The cast featured Victoria Hamilton-Barritt as Alex Owens, Matt Willis as Nick Hurley, Sarah Ingram as Hannah Owens and Sam Mackay as Jimmy Kaminsky.

Previews were due to begin on September 24, 2010, postponed by technical difficulties to the following day.

=== US national tours ===
The first national tour began on December 28, 2012, at Stanley Performing Arts Center in Utica, New York. Emily Padgett and Sydney Morton starred as Alex Owens. Directed & Choreographed by Sergio Trujillo

A non-equity company led by Julia Macchio as Alex Owens toured the United States in 2015/2016, with additional performances in Canada and New Zealand.

=== 2017–2018 UK tour ===
A UK tour produced by Selladoor Worldwide started on August 10, 2017, in Glasgow, with Joanne Clifton as Alex Owens and Ben Adams as Nick Hurley, and closed on 20 October 2018 in Grimsby.

=== Other regions ===
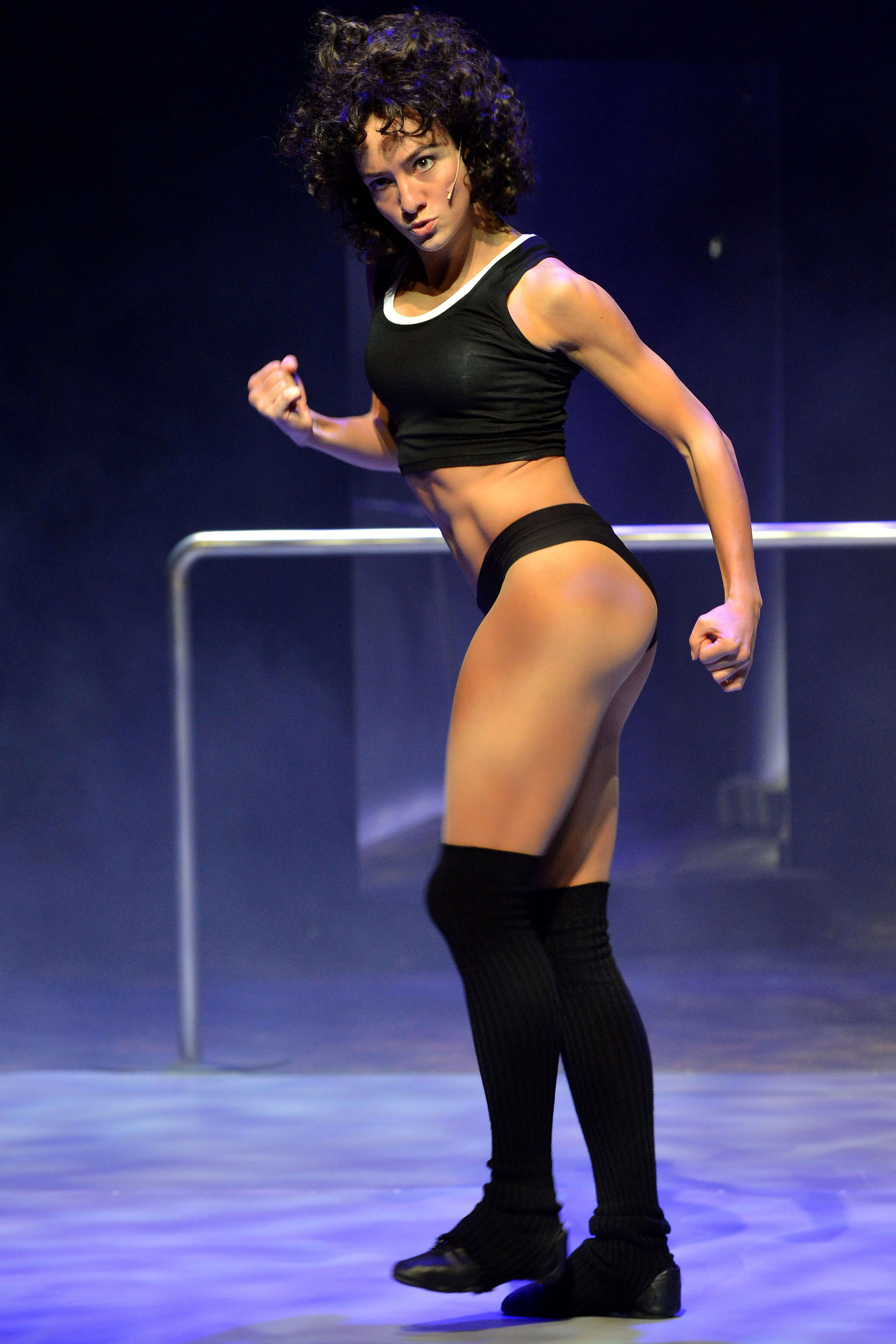
Czech production at the Brno City Theatre

The show also had a Fall 2013 touring production in Holland followed by a major production in Stockholm, Sweden from January 2014 until March 2015. This newly revised version of the show, including new story and musical elements, was hugely successful and continued on to appearances in additional Swedish cities, including Gothenburg and Malmö.

In addition, the show had a successful seven-month run in Paris from September 2014 through March 2015 at the Théâtre du Gymnase, followed by an arena tour in over 40 cities in France from January 2016 to May 2016. A new run of the show is produced in 2023 at the Casino de Paris followed by a French tour.

The German-language premiere took place in Kriens, Switzerland in November 2013 followed by a production in Chemnitz, Germany and Amstetten, Lower Austria in 2014. The musical has since been performed in multiple regional German-language productions. It was translated into German by Anja Hauptmann. A German language version of the show produced by company ShowSlot GmbH, directed by Christoph Drewitz and choreographed by Kerstin Reid has been touring Germany, Austria and Switzerland since 2021. The show is expected to continue touring into 2024.

A Danish production opened in 2019, running at the Copenhagen Opera House and Musikhuset Aarhus.

A Czech production at the Brno City Theatre ran for four years in repertoire, with a translation by Jiří Josek.

=== Broadway production ===
There had been discussion of a Broadway production. In December 2011, reports emerged stating a re-working of the London production would premiere on Broadway in "fall 2012". However, as of March 2012, the official website was showing a single page with a reworked logo and the tag line "Coming to a city near you" and a confirmed engagement for the tour to visit Pittsburgh's Heinz Hall (the city where the production is set) from January 1 to 6, 2013. It was later announced that after the tour, Flashdance would transfer to Broadway in August 2013. However, the producers announced in April 2013 that the August opening of Flashdance on Broadway would be postponed. The producers said that the postponement was due to a lack of theatres in the fall and too many subplots.

== Cast and band ==
Character	Original UK tour cast	Original West End cast
Alex Owens	Victoria Hamilton-Barritt	Victoria Hamilton-Barritt
Nick Hurley	Noel Sullivan	Matt Willis
Gloria	Ruthie Stephens	Charlotte Harwood
Keisha	Carryl Thomas	Hannah Levane
Jazmin	Djalenga Scott	Twinnie-Lee Moore
Jimmy	Bruno Langley	Sam Mackay
Hannah	Bernie Nolan	Sarah Ingram
Harry	Gavin Spokes	Russell Dixon
Dr Kool	Simon Harvey	Ricky Rojas
C.C. La Drue	Michael Conway	Robbie White
Joe	Gavin Spokes	Russell Dixon
Sammy	Simon Harvey	Andrew Spillett
Abe	Michael Conway	Brendan Cull
Band		
Music supervisor	Phil Edwards	Phil Edwards
MD/Keys	Dave Rose	Dave Rose
AST MD/Keys	Mike Horth	Mike Horth
Keys	Phil Waddington	Phil Waddington
Drums	Ian Whitehead	Ian Whitehead
Bass	Ian Stewart (Plymouth) Jon Cooper	Martin Cohen
Guitar	Alistair Marshall	Alistair Marshall
Guitar	Adam Threlfall	Vic Saville
Trumpet	Mike Thomas	Mike Thomas
French horn	Alun Rees	Matt Gunner
Violin		Jamie Hutchinson
Orchestral management	Stephen Hill	Stephen Hill

== Critical reception ==
Flashdance has been very well received by the press internationally and also during its US tour. It was generally praised for the performance of its ensemble and its choreography, as well as its updated story. A review by Vancouver Sun noted that while it was still "anchored in '80s music and style," the story had "been retouched to remove a couple of the creepier elements of the original."

The West End production was praised by London Theatre as "a slick and brilliantly-crafted production that's hard to fault."

Theatreview said in their review of the Auckland production that the play "provides much to enjoy, even if you weren't already aware of the iconic Flashdance film."

Most criticism was in regards to the play's attempt to add depth to the simplistic plot of the original 1983 film. Variety commented that the play "unwisely pads" the original film's screenplay.

== Differences between stage and film ==
- The film's characters Jeanie and Tina Tech have been combined to create Gloria.
- Instead of the Zanzibar being a strip club it's now a club with no nudity – just pole dancing.
- The character of Richie Blazik is cut and the character Jimmy Kaminsky is substituted, however the two characters have very little in common.
- The substory in which Alex and Nick break up because Alex believes he's cheating on her is missing from the stage show.
- All the "Flashdancer's" solos are cut, minus Alex's famous chair dance. However this is moved to the end of act one for ease of changing and clean up.
- Songs from the film that are used in the show are used in a different context. For instance, Manhunt is no longer used for a solo dance piece; instead, it is sung over a montage of Nick and Alex on a series of dates. Another example is Gloria. In the film this is used during Jeanie's ice skating solo; however, in the show it is used when Gloria performs in the strip club. However, "What a Feeling" is still used for Alex's audition.
- In the film, Nick convinces Alex to go to her audition; in the stage show, her friends convince her and accompany her to the audition.

== Musical numbers ==
Act One

- "What a Feeling (Intro)" – Kiki, Tess and Gloria
- "Steeltown Sky" – Alex, Nick, Kiki, Tess and Gloria and Ensemble
- "It's All in Reach" – Alex and Gloria
- "Maniac" – Kiki, Tess and Gloria and Female Ensemble
- "Put It On" – Alex, Kiki, Tess and Gloria and Female Ensemble
- "It's All in Reach (Reprise)" – Alex
- "A Million to One" – Hannah and Alex
- "Inside" – Ms. Wilde, Ballet Mistress, Alex and Shipley Students
- "Steeltown Sky (Reprise)" – Steel Workers
- "Justice" – Nick, Joe, Andy and Male Steel Workers
- "Gloria" – Gloria and C.C.
- "I Love Rock 'n' Roll" – Tess
- "Here and Now" – Alex and Nick
- "My Next Step/Maniac (Reprise)" – Alex, Nick, Kiki, Tess and Ensemble

Act Two

- "Chameleon Girls" – C.C., Gloria, Destiny, CandyGirl, Ferrari and Ensemble
- "A Million to One (Reprise)" – Alex
- "Here and Now (Reprise)" – Alex and Nick
- "My Turn" – Alex, Nick, and Ensemble
- "Where I Belong" – Jimmy and Stoop Singers
- "Enough" – Nick
- "Manhunt" – Kiki and Female Ensemble
- "Gloria" – Gloria and Chameleon Girls and Male Ensemble
- "Where I Belong (Reprise)" – Jimmy and Gloria
- "Hang On" – Alex and Nick
- "Try" – Alex
- "What a Feeling" – Kiki, Tess, Gloria and Ensemble
