= Victoria Hamilton-Barritt =

British actress and singer

- Born: May 8, 1982 (age 44); London, England
- Occupations: Actress, singer
- Years active: 2001–present
- Website: instagram.com/victoriahamiltonbarritt

Victoria Hamilton-Barritt (born 8 May 1982) is an English actress and singer known primarily for her roles in musical theatre. She is a Laurence Olivier Award winner, as well as a Grammy Award, three-time Laurence Olivier Award, and five-time WhatsOnStage Award nominee. She is best known for her roles as Stepmother in Cinderella and Millicent Clyde in Paddington: The Musical.

== Early life and education ==
Hamilton-Barritt was born to a father of Italian and German descent and a mother of Anglo-Indian and Persian descent in North West London.

== Personal life ==
As a child, Victoria took ballet at Central School of Ballet and at Urdang Academy. Hamilton-Barritt has ADHD. She is married to design engineer Rory Svensson and the couple have two children.

== Musical theatre ==
Upon graduating in 2001, Hamilton-Barritt was cast in the musical Oh What a Night! playing the role of Cat for the 2001 UK tour, continuing with the show in Hamburg, Germany from January to June 2002. She finished off the tour with a one-month residency at The Sporting Club in Monte Carlo where she also understudied Sheila Ferguson in the role of Roxy Rochelle. In 2002, she played the role of Connie in the Saturday Night Fever Scandinavian Arena Tour.

Hamilton-Barritt's West End debut in came in 2003 with Mamma Mia!, where she understudied the role of Lisa. She then returned to Saturday Night Fever in the 2004 UK tour, this time playing the leading role of Stephanie Mangano. From September 2004 to September 2005 she returned to the West End to play the leading role of Carmen Diaz in Fame at the Aldwych Theatre. She played the role of Anita in the 2006 international tour of West Side Story visiting Germany, Japan and Thailand. In 2007 she performed the role of Maria, understudying the role of Susan, in the first production of Desperately Seeking Susan at the Novello Theatre in the West End.

From June 2008 until May 2009, Hamilton-Barritt starred in the UK tour of Flashdance the Musical, playing the lead role of Alex Owens. The show was a new musical based on the 1983 film. Hamilton-Barritt starred alongside Noel Sullivan, Bernie Nolan and Bruno Langley. Later in 2009, she went on tour with Yusuf Islam (formerly known as Cat Stevens) performing songs from his musical Moonshadow.

In January 2010, Hamilton-Barritt played Rizzo in Grease at the Piccadilly Theatre, alongside Noel Sullivan and Toby Anstis. From September 2010 until January 2011, she starred as Alex Owens in the original West End production of Flashdance. She went on to play the title role of Louise/Gypsy in Paul Kerryson's production of Gypsy at Leicester Curve in 2012 alongside Caroline O'Connor.

In 2013 Hamilton-Barritt appeared in A Chorus Line at the London Palladium as Diana Morales. She played the role of Daniela in Lin Manuel Miranda's In the Heights in 2014. The show opened at the Southwark Playhouse in London and transferred at the Kings Cross Theatre in the Autumn of 2015, where Hamilton-Barritt returned to the role of Daniela while pregnant and retiring the role at eight months pregnant. That same year she played Rafaela in Elegies for Angels, Punks and Raging Queens.

In September 2016 Hamilton-Barritt returned to work in the production of Murder Ballad at the Arts Theatre as the Narrator, alongside Kerry Ellis, Ramin Karimloo and Norman Bowman. In the same year she was nominated for the Olivier Award for Best Actress in a Supporting Role in a Musical for the role.

In 2017 Hamilton-Barritt played the role of Kate in Michael John LaChiusa's The Wild Party at The Other Palace. The production also included Frances Ruffelle as Queenie and John Owen-Jones as Burr.

In 2019 Hamilton-Barritt starred in The View UpStairs playing the role of Inez at the Soho Theatre, in London from 18 July to 24 August.

In 2020, it was announced that Hamilton-Barritt would play the stepmother in Andrew Lloyd Webber's Cinderella, alongside Carrie Hope Fletcher playing Cinderella. The show opened in September 2021 at the Gillian Lynne Theatre and ran until in June 2022.

In 2025, it was announced that Hamilton-Baritt would be joining the West End production of Hadestown and would be playing the role of Persephone.

In August 2025, it was announced that Hamilton-Baritt would join the principal cast for the West End premiere of Paddington: The Musical, playing the role of Millicent Clyde. Previews began on 1 November 2025. The show opened at Savoy Theatre on 30 November 2025.

=== Theatre credits ===
Year	Title	Role	Venue
2001	Oh What a Night!	Cat	International Tour
2002	Saturday Night Fever	Connie	Scandinavian Tour
2003	Mamma Mia	Ensemble/ 1st cover Lisa	Prince of Wales Theatre
2004	Saturday Night Fever	Stephanie Mangano	UK tour
2004 - 2005	Fame	Karen Bruce	Aldwych Theatre
2006	West Side Story	Anita	International Tour
2007	Desperately Seeking Susan	Susan/ Roberta	Novello Theatre
2008 - 2009	Flashdance	Alex Owens	Piccadilly Theatre
2010	Grease	Betty Rizzo	Shaftesbury Theatre & UK tour
2012	Gypsy	Louise/ Gypsy Rose Lee	Leicester Curve
2013	A Chorus Line	Diana Morales	London Palladium
2015	Elegies For Angels, Punks and Raging Queens	Rafaela	Criterion Theatre
2014 - 2015	In the Heights	Daniela	Southwark Playhouse/ King Cross Theatre
2016	Murder Ballad	Narrator	Arts Theatre
2017	The Wild Party	Kate	The Other Palace
2019	The View UpStairs	Inez	Soho Theatre
2020	Cinderella (workshop)	Stepmother	The Other Palace
2021	Cinderella	Stepmother	Gillian Lynne Theatre
2023	Bat Boy: the Musical in concert	Meredith	London Palladium
2024	Bronco Billy	Constance Lily	Charing Cross Theatre
2025	Hadestown	Persephone	Lyric Theatre
2025 - 2026	Paddington: The Musical	Millicent Clyde	Savoy Theatre

== Film ==
In 2009 Hamilton-Barritt appeared in A Bunch of Amateurs, starring Burt Reynolds and Imelda Staunton in which she played a Hollywood director's assistant. She also appeared in a BBC special of A Tale Of Two Cities which was narrated by Michael York.

=== Filmography ===
Year	Title	Role	Notes
2008	A Bunch of Amateurs	Hollywood Studio Assistant	
2015	Holby City	Camilla Calvino	TV series (1 episode)
2015	Call the Midwife	Girl	TV series (1 episode)
2021	Andrew Lloyd Webber's Bad Cinderella	Stepmother	music video

== Awards and nominations ==
Year	Award	Category	Work	Result	Ref
2011	WhatsOnStage Awards	Best Actress in a Musical	Flashdance	Nominated	
2014	The Offies	Female Performance in a Supporting Role in a Musical	In the Heights	Nominated	
2016	WhatsOnStage Awards	Best Supporting Actress in a Musical	In the Heights	Nominated	
2016	BroadwayWorld UK/West End Awards	Best Supporting Actress in a New Production of a Musical	In the Heights	Won	
2017	WhatsOnStage Awards	Best Supporting Actress in a Musical	Murder Ballad	Nominated	
2017	Laurence Olivier Awards	Best Actress in a Supporting Role in a Musical	Murder Ballad	Nominated	
2019	The Offies	Female Performance in a Supporting Role in a Musical	The View UpStairs	Nominated	
2019	BroadwayWorld UK/West End Awards	Best Supporting Actress in a Musical	The View UpStairs	Nominated	
2022	WhatsOnStage Awards	Best Supporting Actress in a Musical	Cinderella	Nominated	
2022	Grammy Awards	Best Musical Theater Album	Cinderella	Nominated	
2022	Laurence Olivier Awards	Best Actress in a Supporting Role in a Musical	Cinderella	Nominated	
2026	WhatsOnStage Awards	Best Supporting Performer in a Musical	Paddington: The Musical	Nominated	
2026	Laurence Olivier Awards	Best Actress in a Supporting Role in a Musical	Paddington: The Musical	Won	
