= Murder Ballad (musical) =

Musical by Juliana Nash and Julia Jordan

- World premiere cast album cover
- Music: Juliana Nash
- Lyrics: Julia Jordan & Juliana Nash
- Book: Julia Jordan
- Premiere: October 31, 2012: Manhattan Theatre Club - Stage II
- Productions: 2012/2013 Off-Broadway; 2014 Houston; 2016 West End; 2016 Tokyo; 2020/2021 The Netherlands; 2020 New Zealand; 2020 South Korea

Murder Ballad is a rock opera musical with music and lyrics by Juliana Nash, and book and lyrics by Julia Jordan.

== Synopsis ==
Murder Ballad centers around a young woman named Sara. She begins the story dating a wild bartender named Tom. After a messy breakup, she falls in love with Michael, a professor at NYU with a more sensible life than Tom's dangerous ways. After getting married and raising a child, Sara starts to long for the old life with Tom. She begins secretly seeing Tom, but as her affair gets more passionate with him, Sara longs to go back to the normal life she had with Michael and her daughter.

== Plot ==
The musical opens with the Narrator warning the audience that one of the four characters will be murdered by the end of the story ("Murder Ballad"). She then introduces Sara and Tom as a young couple living in New York, both working as bartenders to reach their dreams of becoming a musician and an actor, respectively. The two have an intense and passionate relationship that ends in a messy breakup ("Narrator 1"). After splitting, they go their separate ways and vow to never see each other again ("I Love NY").

While walking home from work as a poetry professor at New York University, Michael collides with a drunk and heartbroken Sara ("Narrator 2"). She begs him for a kiss and becomes angry when he refuses her. Concerned, he asks why she's so upset and tries to comfort her ("Little by Little"). He takes her home so she can recover and says that he'll care for her, but she tells him not to make any promises ("Troubled Mind / Promises").

Years pass. Sara and Michael fall in love and end up moving in together and getting married. She gives up her guitar as she adjusts to her more "normal," clean-cut life. It is also revealed that they're planning to have a baby ("Narrator 3"). As the two fall more and more in love ("Turning Into Beautiful"), the focus shifts back to Tom, who has also given up on his acting dreams ("Crying Scene Theme"). Now single, Tom dreams of owning his own club. He remains bitter about Sara and states that he'll never fall in love again. Meanwhile, Sara gives birth to her and Michael's daughter, Frankie, and Michael also gives up on his passions for poetry to study for an MBA ("I Love NY Reprise 1 / Narrator 4").

Five years pass. Sara and Michael disagree on Frankie's future. He wants to prepare her for adult life by sending her to a private school, but she worries about the cost and begins to feel that Michael no longer hears her ("Prattle 1 / Narrator 5"). This leads Sara to fall into a depression ("Coffee's On"). One morning, when going about her routine and dropping Frankie off for school, she sees someone on the street who reminds her of Tom and she begins to reminisce about her past relationship. Though she knows it's wrong, she decides it wouldn't hurt to visit him and decides to call him. ("Prattle 2").

The narrator explains what Tom has been up to over the past five years. He successfully owns his own bar now, called King's Club. He's also in a new relationship, though he doesn't consider it to be very serious ("Narrator 6"). When he learns that Sara plans to visit him, he becomes nostalgic about their time together and reveals that he's been thinking and dreaming about her since their breakup. ("Sara"). Once they finally reunite at the bar, they are overcome with emotion ("Narrator 7") and immediately begin an affair ("Mouth Tattoo"). The narrator reflects on this, saying that it was inevitable ("Narrator 8").

Michael and Sara grow distant and Michael becomes confused and distressed over how withdrawn they've both become ("Sugar Cubes and Rock Salt"). Sara attempts to balance her two lives ("Prattle 3") but feels much more drawn to her new, passionate affair ("My Name"). The Narrator discusses the web of lies built up by the affair, comparing it to an old French cinema ("The Crying Scene"). Tom and Michael both express their desire for Sara to be more open with them ("Coffee's On Reprise") and all the characters reflect on the difficulties of love and relationships ("Built for Longing"). Sara begins to regret the affair.

Sara goes to King's Club to tell Tom she's breaking off their relationship. While she's there, Frankie becomes sick with a fever and Michael takes her home from school. Tom does not take the news of the breakup well, instead demanding that Sara break up with Michael and move in with him. Michael tries to call Sara to tell her about Frankie, but Tom prevents her from picking up the phone. This culminates in Tom attempting to attack her in anger ("Answer Me"). She pushes him away, but he continues to simultaneously threaten her and beg her not to leave ("You Belong to Me"). She rejects him and escapes, trying to think of an alibi to explain to Michael where she was ("Narrator 9").

Now at home, Sara lies to Michael about where she was and apologizes to Frankie, who is recovering. Michael becomes suspicious, but plays along with Sara's story for Frankie's sake ("Troubled Mind Reprise"). Meanwhile, Tom grows obsessed with Sara and hatches a plan to make her his. The Narrator warns the audience that something terrible is about to happen ("I Love NY Reprise 2").

Sara and Michael take Frankie to a playground in Central Park. She vows to forget the affair and return to her old, happy way of life with her family ("Prattle 4"). As she unknowingly watches her daughter on the swing, Tom stalks her and the Narrator surveys the whole situation ("I'll Be There"). Tom goes up to Sara and Michael and taunts the both of them by inviting them to his bar and making suggestive comments about Sara before leaving ("Prattle 5"). Michael immediately realizes that his suspicions about Sara are true and becomes angry, telling her she's destroyed their family ("Little by Little Reprise") and leaving her alone in the park.

Separately, Sara formulates a plan to murder Tom, Michael waits at the bar to kill both Tom and Sara, and Tom revels in his newfound power as the Narrator watches ("Narrator 10 / You Belong to Me Reprise"). The Narrator then confesses that she was actually present during the confrontation at the bar, rather than being an outside observer ("Crying Scene Reprise"). In fact, she was the bartender cleaning up that night as everyone gathered ("Narrator 11").

Sara finds Michael at the bar and loses all her anger. She begs for him not to hurt anyone and apologizes for what she's done. Though he can't bring himself to forgive her, he asks her to promise that he still loves him. She does, and they both exit ("Walk Away / Promises Reprise"), leaving the Narrator alone with Tom, who was also closing up the bar that night. Tom apologizes to the Narrator for his affair with Sara, revealing that the Narrator was actually the girlfriend he was cheating on Sara with. She becomes enraged at this and beats him to death with a baseball bat, fulfilling her own prophecy that someone must die. The murder remains unsolved ("Clubs and Diamonds / Prattle 6").

The musical concludes with the characters returning and warning the audience that everyone loves a bloody, dark story until it happens to them ("Finale").

== Musical numbers ==
- "Murder Ballad" - Narrator, Michael, Sara, Tom
- "Narrator 1" - Narrator, Sara, Tom
- "I Love NY" - Sara, Tom
- "Narrator 2" - Narrator
- "Little By Little" - Michael, Sara
- "Troubled Mind / Promises" - Michael, Sara
- "Narrator 3" - Narrator
- "Turning Into Beautiful" - Michael, Sara
- "Crying Scene Theme" - Narrator
- "I Love NY Reprise 1 / Narrator 4" - Tom, Narrator
- "Prattle 1 / Narrator 5" - Michael, Sara, Narrator
- "Coffee's On" - Sara, Narrator
- "Prattle 2" - Michael, Sara
- "Narrator 6" - Narrator
- "Sara" - Tom, Narrator, Sara
- "Narrator 7" - Narrator
- "Mouth Tattoo" - Sara, Tom, Narrator
- "Narrator 8" - Narrator
- "Sugar Cubes and Rock Salt" - Michael
- "Prattle 3" - Michael, Sara, Tom
- "My Name" - Tom, Sara
- "The Crying Scene" - Narrator
- "Coffee's On Reprise" - Michael, Sara, Tom
- "Built for Longing" - Sara, Michael, Tom, Narrator
- "Answer Me" - Sara, Michael, Tom
- "You Belong to Me" - Tom, Sara
- "Narrator 9" - Narrator
- "Troubled Mind Reprise" - Sara, Michael
- "I Love NY Reprise 2" - Tom, Narrator
- "Prattle 4"- Sara, Michael
- "I'll Be There" - Tom, Narrator
- "Prattle 5" - Michael, Tom, Sara
- "Little By Little Reprise" - Michael, Sara
- "Narrator 10 / You Belong to Me Reprise" - Sara, Narrator, Michael, Tom
- "Crying Scene Reprise" - Narrator
- "Narrator 11" - Narrator
- "Walk Away / Promises Reprise" - Sara, Michael
- "Clubs and Diamonds / Prattle 6" - Narrator, Sara
- "Finale" - Narrator, Michael, Sara, Tom

== Productions ==
Murder Ballad had its world premiere Off-Broadway, where it was produced at Manhattan Theatre Club's Stage II theatre. The production opened on November 15, 2012, following previews from October 31. The cast included John Ellison Conlee, Rebecca Naomi Jones, Will Swenson and Karen Olivo. Originally scheduled to close on December 2, the production was extended by two weeks and closed on December 16, 2012. A cast recording was released. The production transferred to the Off-Broadway Union Square Theatre on May 22, 2013, following previews from May 7. It closed on July 21, 2013. Casting remained the same except for the departure of Karen Olivo, who was replaced by Caissie Levy. The production was nominated for the 2013 Lucille Lortel Award, Outstanding Musical, 2013 Off Broadway Alliance Award, Best New Musical and 2013 Outer Critics Circle Award, Outstanding New Off-Broadway Musical.

The regional premiere took place at TUTS Underground in Houston, Texas in April 2014, with a cast featuring Lauren Molina, Steel Burkhardt, Kristin Warren and Pat McRoberts.

Murder Ballad has its European premiere in Belgium on 9 March 2016. It was translated into Dutch and performed by muziektheater proMITHEus in Leuven, Antwerp and Ghent.

The musical had its UK premiere at the Arts Theatre in the West End, with an opening night on 5 October 2016, following previews from 30 September. The cast featured Kerry Ellis as Sara, Ramin Karimloo as Tom, Norman Bowman as Michael and Victoria Hamilton-Barritt as the narrator (who was nominated for the Laurence Olivier Award for Best Actress in a Supporting Role in a Musical). The production received three nominations at the 2017 Whatsonstage.com Awards, with acting nods for both Karimloo and Hamilton-Barritt, and best video design for Laura Perrett. It played a limited run to 3 December 2016.

In 2016, it premiered in Tokyo with Aya Hirano as Sara and Akinori Nakagawa as Tom.

In 2017, Murder Ballad was presented in Argentina, featuring Florencia Otero as Sara, German Tripel as Michael, Patricio Arellano as Tom, and Sofia Rangone as the Narrator.

2019 saw an Italian version, with lyrics translated and adapted.

From September 2020 till July 2021, a fully Corona-Proof version produced by STENT Productions will tour throughout the Netherlands, the tour has about 100 shows. The producer recently announced that it would bring the Dutch version to Belgium in 2022

In 2020, the Australasian Premiere took place in Greymouth, New Zealand in September. The production was performed at the Regent Theatre Greymouth, from September 23–26, 2020. It was produced by the SuperBrain ProductioNZ, and was directed by Jamie Mosher. The cast featured Rosie Barnes as Sara, Cary Lancaster as Michael, Stephen Brassett as Tom, and Helen Wallis as Narrator.

== Characters and original casts ==
Character	Off-Broadway (2012)	Off-Broadway (2013)	Houston Regional (2014)	West-End (2016)	Buenos Aires (2017)	The Netherlands (2020/2021)	New Zealand (2020)	Belgium (2023)
Narrator	Rebecca Naomi Jones	Rebecca Naomi Jones	Kristin Warren	Victoria Hamilton-Barritt	Sofía Rangone	Cystine Carreon	Helen Wallis	
Sara	Karen Olivo	Caissie Levy	Lauren Molina	Kerry Ellis	Florencia Otero	Vajèn van den Bosch	Rosie Barnes	
Tom	Will Swenson	Will Swenson	Steel Burkhardt	Ramin Karimloo	Patricio Arellano	Jonathan Demoor	Stephen Brassett	
Michael	John Ellison Conlee	John Ellison Conlee	Pat McRoberts	Norman Bowman	Germán "Tripa" Tripel	Buddy Vedder	Cary Lancaster	
Male Standby	Josh Tower	Josh Tower		Matthew Harvey				
Female Standby	Nicole Lewis	Natalie Wachen		Natalie McQueen				
