= The Water Coolers =

- The comedy group that sings.

Comedy career
- Years active: 2000-Present
- Medium: Corporate, Consumer, and Association Events, Theatre, Recordings
- Genres: Music and Comedy
- Subject: The things people talk about around the proverbial water cooler
- Website: The Water Coolers

The Water Coolers Off Broadway

"Casual Friday"

The Water Coolers is a New York City–based music and comedy act performing original songs, sketch comedy and pop parodies about the daily challenges of modern life. The Water Coolers was created specifically for the meetings and events industry but has also successfully expanded to Off Broadway, licensed productions in various cities and theatrical touring dates.

The Water Coolers made its debut in New York City on September 30, 2000. An Off-Broadway version opened in 2002.

== Biography ==
=== Background ===
The Water Coolers is the creation of husband-and-wife team Thomas Michael Allen (actor/writer, member of the Tony award-winning Lehman Engle Musical Theater Workshop and co-creator of Tony N' Tina's Wedding) and corporate consultant Sally Allen. In the summer of 2000, they gathered a group of professional writers and friends in the corporate world to devise an act based on the dynamic of their own marriage: the union of music, comedy and business.

=== To Date ===
The Water Coolers made its debut appearance in New York City on September 30, 2000. In 2002, they opened Off-Broadway for the fall season. During that time and since, the act has traveled around the country and the world doing both public theatrical performances and private corporate events. In 2009 and 2012 they received the Spotlight Award for Ensemble Entertainers of the Year, one of only 3 acts to win this award multiple times.

== Current ==
In addition to Tom and Sally Allen, the team of writers currently consists of Joe Allen (sales manager), Ray Bokhour (lyricist), Dan Israel (composter), Phoebe Kreutz (lyricist), E. Andrew Sensenig (investment banker, and former CEO), and Justin Warner (lyricist). The actors in the revolving cast have appeared on and off Broadway, in television and radio commercials, in such TV shows as Law & Order, Rescue Me, General Hospital, All My Children, Harvey Birdman, Attorney at Law, The Tonight Show with Conan O'Brien and in major comedy clubs and concert halls across the country.

=== Meetings and Events ===
The Water Coolers have performed nationally and internationally for such clients as AT&T, Sterling Jewelers, Microsoft, Kindred Healthcare, Choice Hotels, Lego, Honeywell, Cigna, Pitney Bowes, IBM, Express Script, and AFLAC. In 2014, they introduced a keynote comedy show that outlines the keys to delivering a great performance.

=== Licensed Productions ===
Theatrical productions have been mounted in Chicago, Atlanta, Miami, and Rochester, NY.

=== Recordings ===
The Water Coolers: Original Off Broadway Cast Album
The Water Coolers Live (Recorded at the Napa Valley Opera House)
