= Inside Out (musical) =

Inside Out, earlier known as Roleplay, was an American musical which tells a story of a six-person support group. It was co-written by Adryan Russ and Doug Haverty.

== Production history ==
Premiered in 1989, as Roleplay at the Group Repertory Theatre in Los Angeles, after a number of out-of town productions, in 1994 it opened off-Broadway at the Cherry Lane Theatre, New York City. Its 1998 production at the Laguna Playhouse in Laguna Beach, California, it garnered its authors the Robby Award. In 2000, 12 Miles West Theatre Company in Montclair NJ produced this musical and won the Star Ledger award for best play. Directed by Lenny Bart, starring Mona Hennessy, Tricia Burr, and others.

== Characters ==
1. Grace - the therapist
2. Molly - a recent mother whose husband has lost sexual interest in her, she is suffering from a growing case of anorexia
3. Liz - "a high-powered businesswoman with children, is on a collision course with her house-husband mate, who demands more of her time"
4. Sage - a self-destructive character in regards to her love life and very dependent on astrology tarot cards, etc...to show her fate
5. Chlo - "an unattached lesbian mother whose teen-age son has begun rebelling against her excessive devotion"
6. Dena - an insecure pop singer who has had an 11-year rough patch in her career

== Song list ==
- 1 Inside Out
- 2 Let It Go
- 3 Thin
- 4 I Can See You Here
- 5 If You Really Loved Me
- 6 Yo, Chlo
- 7 If You Really Loved Me (Reprise)
- 8 Behind Dena's Back
- 9 No One Inside
- 10 Inside Out (Reprise)
- 11 Grace's Nightmare
- 12 All I Do Is Sing
- 13 Never Enough
- 14 I Don't Say Anything
- 15 The Passing Of A Friend
- 16 Things Look Different
- 17 Do It At Home
- 18 Reaching Up
