= Nanta (theatrical show) =

South Korean cooking comedy show

- Formation: 1997
- Type: Theatre group
- Purpose: Non-verbal physical theatre
- Location: South Korea
- Website: https://www.nanta.co.kr:452/en/

Nanta (Korean: 난타; Hanja: 亂打, also known as Cookin or Cookin' Nanta) is a South Korean non-verbal comedy show created and produced by Song Seung-whan and incorporates traditional samul nori rhythm.

== Features ==
The musical has a simple back story of three cooks attempting to finish preparing a wedding banquet within a strict time limit while the manager installs his incompetent nephew among the kitchen staff. The show involves acrobatics, magic tricks, comedy, pantomime and audience participation. The unifying element throughout the musical is the use of traditional Korean samul nori music, which in this case is performed with improvised instruments, such as cutting boards, water canisters and kitchen knives. The performance is almost completely non-verbal. The very few words which are spoken are mostly in English.

== History ==
In 1996, Song Seung-hwan of PMC Production, reached out to Kim Moon-soo after being impressed by his unconventional a 7-minute performance at an exhibition using broken refrigerators, vacuum cleaners, and buckets. He did a play with Song Seung-hwan in 1993. song watched Kim playing janggu and pansori carefully and invited him to the Nanta. Song Seung-hwan was planning a completely new piece and said, Let’s work together. They began their partnership in the spring of 1996. After research by Kim Deok-su, a member of the samul nori band, Nanta premiered in October 1997 in Hoam Art Hall in Seoul. The premiere performance was a success. So when Nanta member audition open in 1998, almost all of the Daehakro actors auditioned. Actor Ryu Seung-ryong auditioned in 1998, he was selected as a spare member and then joined.

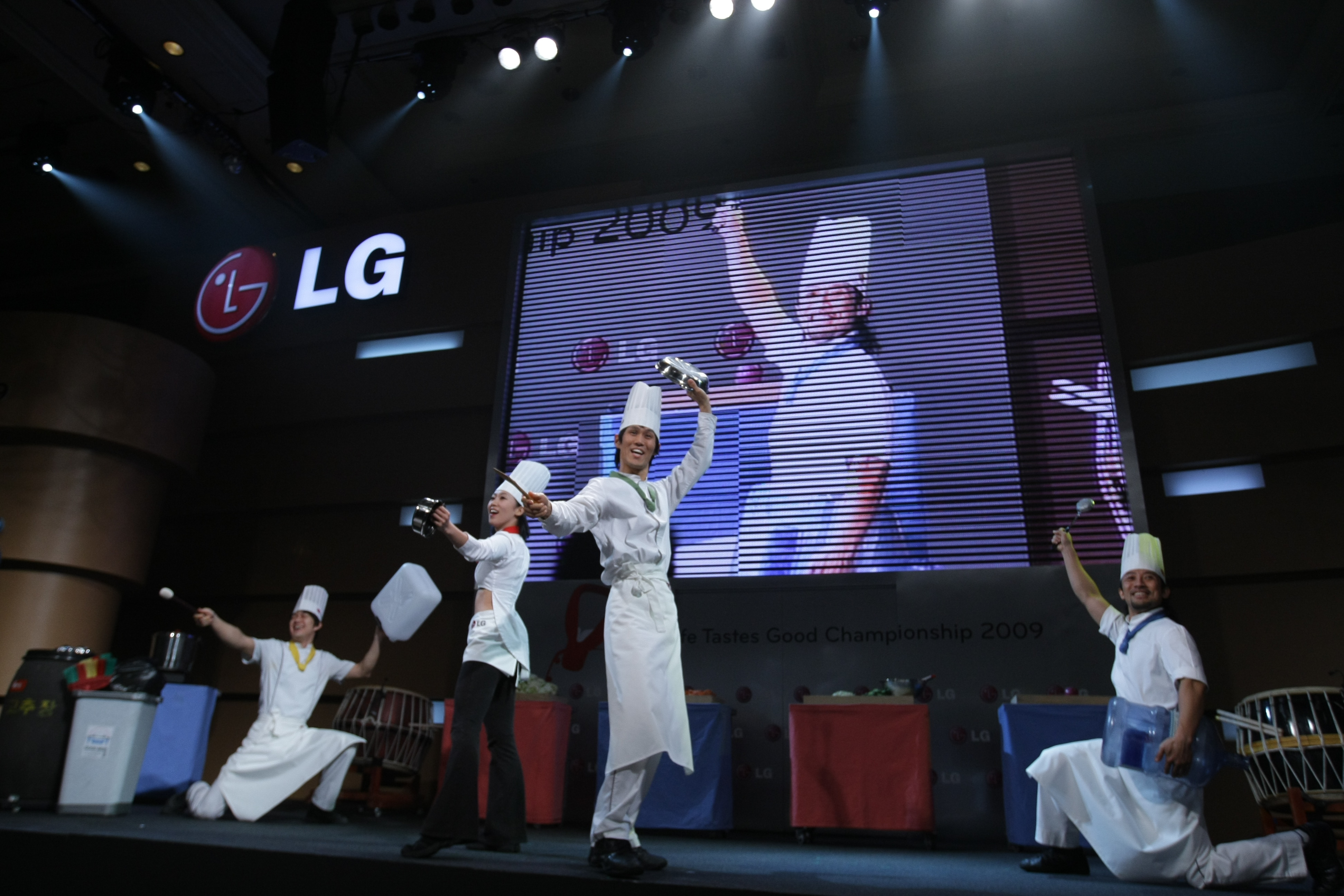
A Nanta performance at the LG Life Tastes Good Championship, in Bangkok, 2009

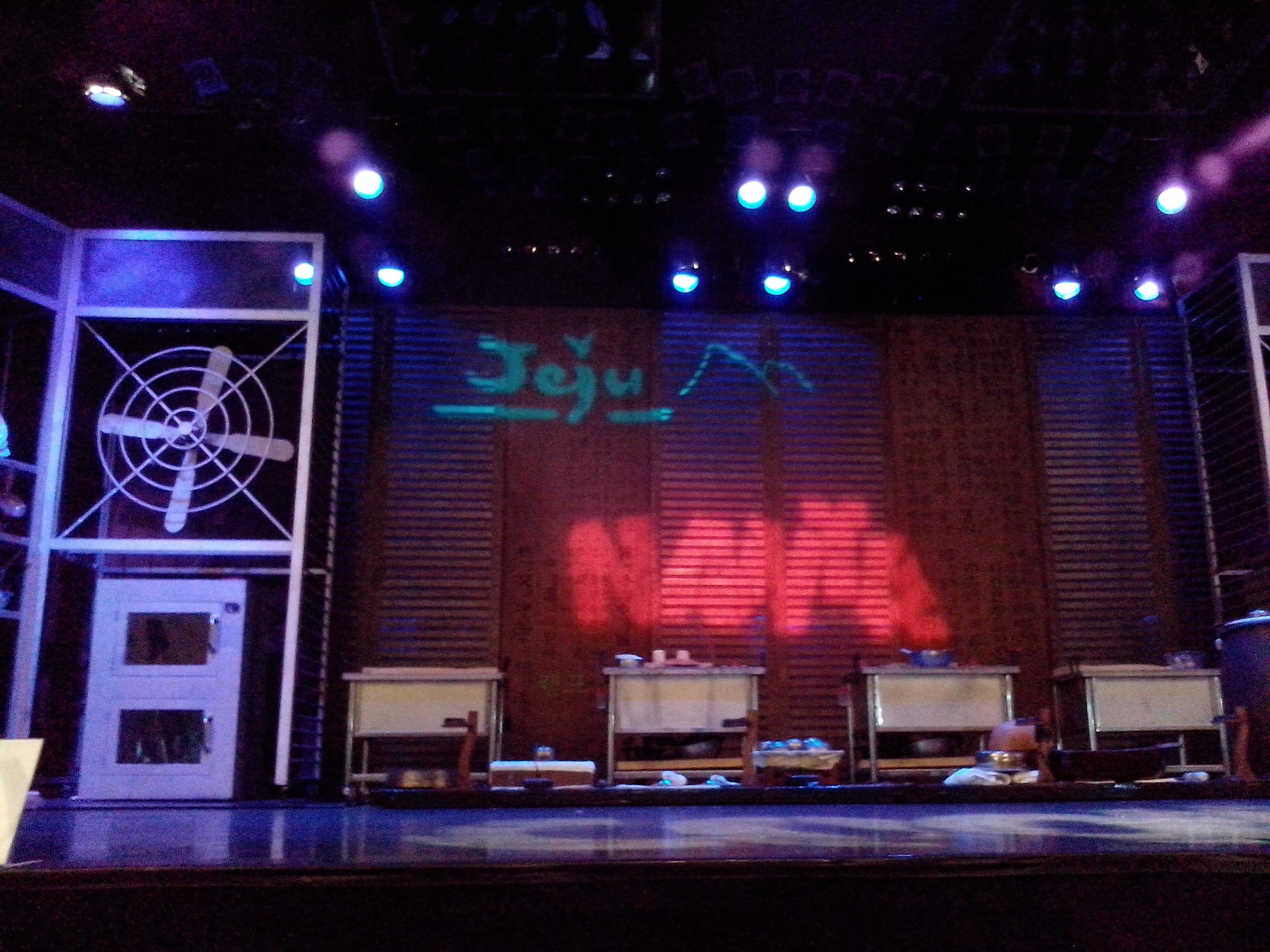
Nanta performance at Jeju

== Popularity ==
Nanta is the longest-running show in Korean history. In Korea, it has two private theaters in Seoul(Myeong-dong, Hongdae), one on the island of Jeju, the other in Bangkok, Thailand. The musical made its international debut at the 1999 Edinburgh Festival Fringe, where it received an award for best performance. Since then it has been staged in 57 countries around the world. Nanta opened Off-Broadway in New York City in 2004 and ended its run in August 2005. In March 2017, Hotel Nanta opened in Jeju island.

== See also ==
- Myeong-dong
- Samulnori
- Hongdae, Seoul
- Performance
