= Cesar Santos =

Cuban-American artist and portrait painter

- César Santos
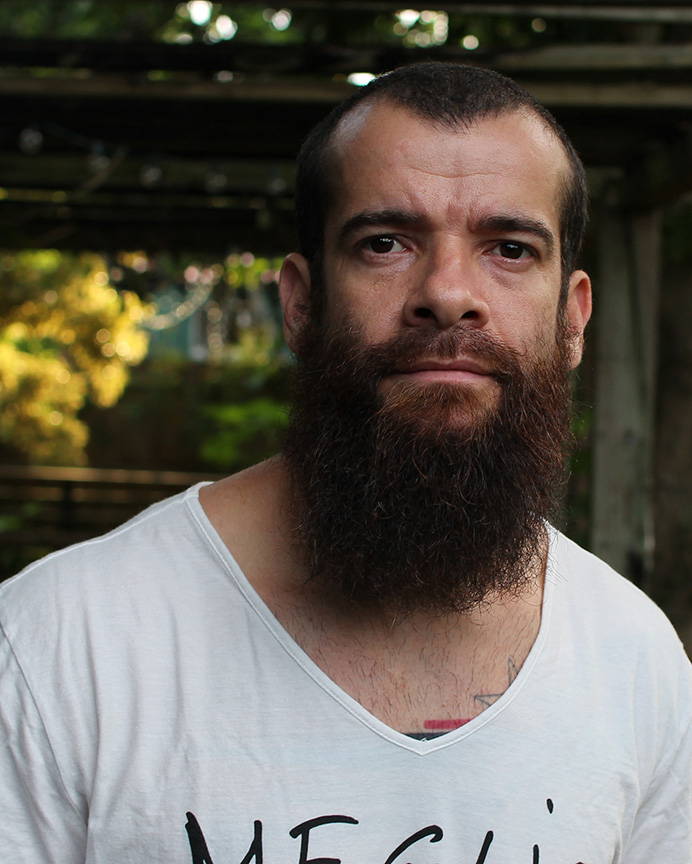
- Born: Cesar Santos; July 10, 1982 (age 44); Santa Clara, Cuba
- Education: Design and Architecture Senior High, New World School of the Arts, Angel Academy of Art, Florence
- Known for: Painting; portraiture; Syncretism series
- Notable work: Syncretism; Temperance; Dancers; The Artist's Accomplice
- Style: Classical realism; contemporary figurative art
- Movement: Contemporary realism; Syncretism
- Relatives: Raúl Santos Zerpa (uncle)
- Awards: Grand Prize, Academy of Realist Art Boston Figure Painting Competition (2016); First Prize, Grand Central Academy Portrait Competition (2014); Miami Dade College Hall of Fame Award (2013); Grand Prize, ACOPAL “Out of the Square” (2011); First Place, The Metropolitan Museum of Art “It’s Time We Met” Contest (2010)
- Website: www.cesarsantos.com

Cesar Santos (born July 10, 1982) is a contemporary Cuban-American artist and portrait painter. He is better known for his body of work "Syncretism", a term he uses to describe paintings where he presents two or more art tendencies in aesthetic balance. He has completed numerous commissions and his work is held in private as well as public collections around the world.

Santos' work has been displayed at the Annigoni Museum in Villa Bardini Florence, Beijing Museum in China, Museum of Contemporary Art in Sicily (MacS) and the National Gallery in Costa Rica. Santos is part of the Living Masters' Gallery at the Art Renewal Center in Glenham.

== Early life and education ==
Santos was born in Santa Clara, Cuba, on July 10, 1982. As a child, he was passionate about boxing. He competed in kids boxing tournaments at a municipal level. He also started studying art at a young age, impressed by his uncle Raul Santos Zerpa, a prominent Cuban painter in the 1960s. In 1995, he immigrated with his family to the United States where he was accepted into the Design and Architecture Senior High. After graduating from the Design and Architecture Senior High, Santos enrolled at New World School of the Arts for an Associate of Arts Degree given by the Miami Dade College.

While studying visual arts at the New World School of the Arts, Santos was also studying acting from the year 2000 to 2004 under Teresa Maria Rojas the founder of Prometeo, a theater program at the Miami Dade College Wolfson Campus. During this time, he pursued acting professionally and acted in a number of theatre productions and television shows. However, dissatisfied by the modernist approach of the school, he dropped out and travelled to Italy in search of training in the art of painting. He joined the Angel Academy of Arts in Florence and studied the techniques and methods of the Renaissance, 18th century, and the French ateliers of 19th century under Michael John Angel, student of Pietro Annigoni. Upon leaving the United States, Santos also gave up his career in acting.

== Career ==
In 2006, Santos completed his training in Florence and returned to Miami. Initially he started painting still life pieces, but he felt that something was missing from his work and began incorporating the figure into his compositions. In 2007, he was commissioned to create the official poster for the Miami International Ballet Festival. He made the poster entitled Danza Impossible, which received positive reviews and the next year he was commissioned to make the poster for Miami International Film Festival 2008.

Santos moved to Stockholm, Sweden in 2008 where he started teaching and giving workshops at the Atelier Stockholm. Alongside his work as an artist and a teacher, he trained for boxing at the Narva Boxningsklubb. Subsequently, he participated in the Angered Centrum Box Cup and won the gold medal.

In 2010 Santos moved to New York City, where he started working on Syncretism, which received critical acclaim and became one of his best known works. The collection includes several paintings in which he combined the iconic images of Pollock, Calder, Picasso and many others. "Syncretism is a philosophical vision intending to reconcile different doctrines, a social mechanism that attenuates the confrontation between antagonistic tendencies competing for the same space." The body of work attempts to accommodate the foremost trends of the past six centuries. While in New York, he participated in Metropolitan Museum's 2010 contest "It's Time We Met" and received first place for his photograph Dancers. In 2014, he received first prize in the portrait competition at the Grand Central Academy in New York. Santos participated in the Art Basel week at the Concept Art Fair, where he was awarded the first prize.

Santos released a 4-disc DVD titled Secrets of Portrait Painting that features him giving a full demonstration of his painting technique using his wife as the model. In the DVD, he begins with a basic drawing and then follows with his painting process of dead coloring, first painting, and second painting. He is regularly invited to lecture on his painting techniques throughout the world, where he teaches portrait anatomy and structure from various points of view.

=== Artistry and style ===
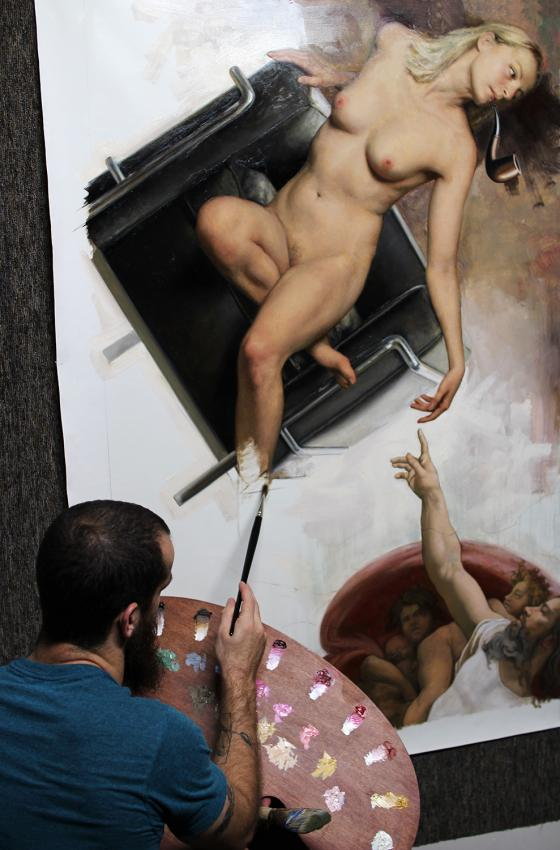
Santos painting Recreation

Santos' work reflects both classical and modern interpretations within one painting; his work has been influenced by the Renaissance as well as Contemporary Art. Forum MDC wrote of his work that "in an era in which technique is often an afterthought, Cesar Santos is a modern master who evocatively combines the classical and the contemporary in his paintings." According to Santos, "the ultimate goal of his syncretic work is to establish a new painterly realm with its own defined characteristics; like any other legitimate process of evolution, it gains a foothold in the preceding stages until the assimilation of the opposing trends is expressed as a newly born and unified entity." The influence of his contemporary training in the US and classic training in Florence is evident in his work, of which Western Art and Architecture wrote that "trained in both classical painting and contemporary art, painter Cesar Santos creates work with vivacity, opulent color and sensual figures to evoke both a unique perspective as well as a sense of irony."

While initially most of his work was on still life such as his painting Camera in 2008, humans and life-form became the focus of his work in the later years of his career depicted by his series Syncretism and subsequent work. Nudes characterise much of his work. Miami Herald wrote in a review of The Artist's Accomplice that "Santos' process is a fluid one. He tries new techniques and integrates any that help him work more effectively." He works primary with oils on linen, which helps him in achieving what he calls a "neo-academic" technique. Boston Globe wrote an article about a painting competition where Santos won the grand prize; the newspaper in part quoted him: "Like a poet will be able to write a sentence . . . we have to be able to write what is in front of us visually," he said. "[You] control your tools so that you can express your feelings."

Cesar has a YouTube channel where he posts painting tutorials and other art-related videos.

== Critical reception ==
Santos has been featured in art magazines and TV programmes all over the world. His work has been reviewed by several media publications. In 2011, The American Artist reviewed his painting Temperance and wrote that "The pose in this painting is not an unusual one, but the image is intriguing and speaking with artists uncovers the subtle agenda that adds depth to this portrait."

Santos received wide media coverage after his exhibition Syncrestism, which received positive reviews. Cultura Inequita reviewed the series writing that "Santos' work reflects both classical and modern interpretations juxtaposed within one painting." Beautiful/Decay wrote that in Snycretism "[he] thoughtfully blends disparate styles and elements... [his] amalgamations present representations from Renaissance, Modern, Classic, and Contemporary work, all blended together to create a pastiche of imagery." and Juxtapoz wrote that "[he] weaves together complex and divergent art forms into single paintings." The Huffington Post also praised the exhibition writing that "part classical oil portrait and part nudie pic, Santos' mashups encompass the evolution (or devolution) of the female portrait over time."

The American Arts Quarterly used a painting from Syncretism for their Winter 2012 cover and reviewing the work wrote that "Santos' more conceptual juxtapositions are firmly rooted in mainstream art history... Santos's humor overtakes the dialogue between past and present, and the painting topples over into frivolousness."

In 2013, Miami Herald praised Santos for his ability to juxtapose two opposite ideas in one painting writing about The Artist's Accomplice that "his new show at Oxenberg juxtaposes the sensuous and finely rendered female nudes that characterise much of his work with rough burlap surfaces of an antique artist's mannequin."

Santos' latest solo exhibition Cesar Santos Drawings has been praised by Marti Noticias, who wrote that Santos' "drawing and painting [are] reminiscent of a Renaissance master".

== Filmography ==
=== Theatre ===
Year	Title	Role	Notes
	Persecucion: by Reinaldo Arenas	Principal	Hispanic Theatre Festival/Prometeo Miami-Dade Community College
2001	Canciones en la terraza	Percussionist	Miami Book Fair International 2001/Prometeo Miami-Dade Community College
2002	Tentempie	Principal	Miami Book Fair International 2002/Prometeo Miami-Dade Community College
	Matias y el Aviador	Aviator	Hispanic Theatre Festival/Prometeo Miami-Dade Community College

=== Television ===
Title	Role	Notes
Commercials	Principal	Mc Donnalds, Toyota, MetroPCS
Univision	El Reportero Insolito; Cupido	segmento en: Sabado Gigante 2002 segmento en: Sabado Gigante 2003
Univision	Principal; Mario	Radisson Mart Plaza Hotel Miami, FL 2003; Al filo de la ley 2003

== Awards and honors ==
- Grand Prize and People's Choice Award, Academy of Realist Art Boston Figure Painting Competition - 2016
- First Prize, Cosmic Connection, Concept Art Fair (Art Basel Week) - 2014
- Third Prize, Grand Central Academy Still Life Competition - 2014
- First Prize, Grand Central Academy Portrait Sketch Competition - 2013
- Miami Dade College Hall of Fame Award - 2013
- Grand Prize Winner, ACOPAL's open competition, "Out of the Square" - 2011
- 10 Cover Contest Winners, American Artist Magazine, "Temperance" - 2011
- First Place, Southwest Art Magazine, 21 under 31 Competition, "Young Versed" - 2010
- First Place, The Metropolitan Museum of Art, It's Time We Met Contest, "Dancers" - 2010
- Hudson River Fellowship - 2010
