= Darren Ritchie =

Darren Ritchie may refer to:

- Darren Ritchie (actor) (born 1977), American actor and singer
- Darren Ritchie (long jumper) (born 1975), Scottish long jumper
