= Edward Staudenmayer =

American musical theater actor and singer

- Education: University of California, Los Angeles
- Occupations: Actor, singer

Edward Staudenmayer is an American musical theater actor and singer. He is known for his roles as Vlad in the first national tour of Anastasia, Monsieur Gilles André in The Phantom of the Opera national tour, and Meyer Wolfsheim in The Great Gatsby national tour.

== Education and career ==
=== Education ===
Edward Staudenmayer was born and raised in California. He was involved in his high school's theater program and performed in The Music Man. He received a scholar ship to attend University of California, Los Angeles to study musical theater. While in college, he won the Carol Burnett Award.

=== Off-Broadway career ===
Staudenmayer made his Off-Broadway debut as a performer in the 1998 production of Forbidden Broadway Cleans Up Its Act. He can be heard in the original cast recording published in 1999 for this musical. That same year, he played Kevin Bursteter in the Off-Broadway production of Exactly Like You.

=== Broadway career ===
In 2006, Staudenmayer made his Broadway debut as an understudy in Martin Short: Fame Becomes Me. Five years later, he played the White Rabbit in the Broadway production of Wonderland.

=== National-tour career ===
In 2013, Staudenmayer joined the national tour of The Phantom of the Opera as Monsieur Gilles André. When he first saw the musical in junior high, Monsieur André was his favorite character, and Staudenmayer wanted to play him in the future. Two and a half years later, Staudenmayer took a short break from the tour but returned to play Monsieur André again.

Most recently, Staudenmayer played Vlad in the first national tour of Anastasia. His run as Vlad, which began in 2018, ended in March 2020, when all remaining performances of the first national tour were cancelled due to the COVID-19 pandemic.

== Performance credits ==
Year(s)	Production	Role	Location	Category
1998	Forbidden Broadway Cleans Up Its Act	Performer	Stardust Theater	Off-Broadway
1999	Exactly Like You	Kevin Bursteter	York Theatre at St. Peter's	Off-Broadway
2004	Joseph and the Amazing Technicolor Dreamcoat	Pharaoh	Various	Summer Stock Tour (with Jon Secada)
2006	Martin Short: Fame Becomes Me	Comedy All Star understudy	Bernard B. Jacobs Theatre	Broadway
2011	Wonderland	White Rabbit	Marquis Theatre	Broadway
2013–2018	The Phantom of the Opera	Monsieur Gilles André	Various	National Tour
2016	South Pacific	Emile de Becque	Guthrie Theater	Minneapolis
2018–2020	Anastasia	Vlad	Various	National Tour
2020–2022	Girl from the North Country	Swing	Belasco Theatre	Broadway
2023	Man of La Mancha	Don Quixote / Miguel de Cervantes	Riverside Theatre	Florida
2023	A Little Night Music	Fredrik Egerman	Denver Center for the Performing Arts	Denver
2025	Legally Blonde	Professor Callahan	La Mirada Theatre	California
2025	The Great Gatsby	Meyer Wolfsheim	GS Arts Center	South Korea
2026	The Great Gatsby	Meyer Wolfsheim	Various	National Tour
