= Exactly Like You =

Exactly Like You may refer to:

- "Exactly Like You" (song), a 1930 song by Jimmy McHugh and Dorothy Fields
- Exactly Like You (album), a 1956 album by The Ames Brothers
- Exactly Like You (musical), a 1999 musical by Cy Coleman and A. E. Hotchner
