= Kuhl & Leyton =

Kuhl & Leyton are a contemporary visual collaborative by artists Brad Kuhl and Monique Leyton. The artists create art using colored tape, acrylic tape, packing tape, and bookbinding tape. Kuhl & Leyton's visual art is part of the broader genre of social commentary.

Brad Kuhl and Monique Leyton met at DASH (Design and Architecture High School) in Miami, FL. They both received a BFA from Cornell University in 2005 where they began collaborating while abroad in Rome, Italy in 2003. Influences on their art include their hometown of Miami, Cops (TV series), CSI: Miami, medical shows and reality shows.

One of their famous visual-art series, which was created in 2012, was "Elite Deviance". This body of artwork was created using colored tape on paper. It is a visual exploration of white-collar crimes of the past decade such as the Enron scandal, Martha Stewart's involvement with the ImClone stock trading case, the Bernie Madoff investment scandal, the Jack Abramoff CNMI scandal, and the Stanford Financial Group Ponzi scheme. "Elite Deviance" was first displayed at CSUF Grand Central Art Center in 2013.

The duo are currently living and working on art in Beijing where they teach at the Central Academy of Fine Arts.

== Awards ==
- 2007 First Place at Art and Culture Center of Hollywood All-Media Juried Biennial
