= New World School of the Arts =

Location
- 25 NE 2ND Street; Downtown, Miami, Florida; United States

Information
- Type: Public magnet, college
- Established: August 1987
- School district: Miami-Dade County Public Schools
- Teaching staff: 30.00 (FTE)
- Grades: 9–12; college BFA candidates sophomore-senior
- Enrollment: 466 (2022–23)
- Average class size: 19
- Student to teacher ratio: 15.53
- Schedule: 7:30 a.m. to 3:45 p.m.
- Campus: Urban
- Colors: Cyan, magenta and yellow
- Mascot: Pigeon
- Website: New World School of the Arts

The New World School of the Arts (NWSA) is a public magnet high school and college in Downtown Miami, Florida. Its dual-enrollment programs in the visual and performing arts are organized into four strands: visual arts, dance, theatre (comprising programs in theater and musical theatre), and music (comprising programs in instrumental music and vocal music).

The school is jointly administered by Miami-Dade County Public Schools, Miami Dade College, and the University of Florida. The administrative structure includes an executive board with representatives from each of the partners as well as community seats and a foundation board.

The school awards an Associate in Arts degree from Miami Dade College, Bachelor of Fine Arts and Bachelor of Music degrees from the University of Florida, and a high school diploma from Miami-Dade County Public Schools.

== History ==
Kendell Bently-Baker, inspired by the academic success of that program, and attempting to take greater advantage of the facilities and faculty of Miami Dade College (MDC), then known as Miami Dade Community College, proposed the creation of a dual-enrollment school of the arts: morning academics were to be at the student's home high school; in the afternoon students were to be bussed to one of the two MDCC campuses for classes in art or the performing arts.

In summer 1982, county auditions were held for 10th–12th graders. In fall 1982, two dual-enrollment Performing And Visual Arts Center (PAVAC) locations opened, one at the North Campus of MDCC, "PAVAC North", headed by Kendell Bently-Baker; the other at the South Campus of MDCC (now called the Kendall Campus), "PAVAC South", headed by Richard Janaro and Margaret Pelton. Marcy Samiento continued to serve as DCPS coordinator.

The first PAVAC dual-enrollment graduates were in 1983. The Miami Northwestern High School program continued as before the creation of PAVAC, and is currently among the PVA (performing and visual arts) magnet programs in the Miami-Dade County school system.

In 1984, Marcy Sarmiento, Kandell Bentley-Baker and Richard Janaro were asked to plan a successor school to PAVAC. Knowing they would need approval from the Florida Legislature they enlisted civic leader and lobbyist Seth Gordon to join them. Gordon was later elected to serve as the first chair of the Executive Board of the school and served in that capacity for six years. They studied other arts schools in the country, visiting LaGuardia High School, Juilliard and the North Carolina School of the Arts. A bill creating the "South Florida School of the Arts" passed the Florida House of Representatives on May 30, 1984. Soon afterwards, the New World name was chosen as part of larger plans for urban and cultural development which included the eponymous New World Symphony Orchestra, and to avoid confusion with the Florida School of the Arts. The Florida legislature passed the "New World School of the Arts Act" in 1986.

The NWSA opened its doors in fall 1987. The continuing students at PAVAC's North and South transitioned into NWSA, as did many of PAVAC's faculty. NWSA issued its first high school diploma in 1988 to the former PAVAC students. NWSA enrolled its first freshman college students in 1988. In order to award a BFA, it partnered with Florida International University (FIU). On January 12, 1994 University of Florida replaced FIU in this partnership. The first graduating class of the college was in 1992.

== Administration ==
=== Dean of Dance ===
The founding Dean of Dance was Daniel Lewis (https://daniellewisdance.com/about/) A graduate of The Juilliard School, Lewis performed globally with the Jose Limon Dance Company and served as Mr. Limon’s Assistant. A faculty member and Assistant Director of Dance Department of Juilliard, he was recruited to join NWSA from its inception and built the dance program over a distinguished tenure of 24 years. Upon his retirement, Mr. Lewis was succeeded in 2011 by Mary Lisa Burns, a former dancer with the companies of Kenneth King, Gina Gibney and others. Burns previously served as adjunct faculty of Barnard College and faculty member and Director of Education for the Merce Cunningham Studio.

=== Dean of Music ===
John de Lancie was the director of Philadelphia's famed Curtis Institute of Music before becoming the founding Dean at New World. He submitted his resignation in December 1991 but rescinded it that same month, then resigned definitively in September 1992. He was replaced by Willie Anthony Waters, principal conductor of the Greater Miami Opera. Waters was replaced in August 1993 with Balint Vazsonyi, who was asked to resign in September 1994.

Since then the position has been filled by: Tallulah Brown, 1994–95; Karl Kramer, 1995–97; Roby George, 1997–98; Mark Camphouse, 1998–99; Dennis Prime, 1999–2002; Jeffrey Hodgson, 2002-2009; Jim Gasior, 2009-2012; and Milton Ruben Laufer 2012-2014.

Daniel Andai, an alumnus of NWSA Music Division, was appointed Dean of Music in summer 2014.

=== Dean of Theater ===
Richard Paul Janaro agreed to serve as acting Dean of Theater at the school's inception. Jorge Guerra Castro became Dean of Theater in 1988, and Janaro assumed the role of Assistant Dean of Theater. In 2002 Patrice Bailey took over from Castro. She died in 2022 and was replaced by Alan Patrick Kenny.

Dean of Visual Arts

palencia gustvo

== Campus ==
The school's main building is located at 25 NE 2nd Street, Miami, and holds other classes on the Miami Dade College Wolfson Campus.

Much like the school today, all of its classes were held in different buildings in downtown Miami when the school opened, including the main building of MDC Wolfson campus, as well as space at the Christ Fellowship church at 500 N.E. 1st Avenue, where drawing classes were held on the top floor. The school's current main building (a former AT&T communications department building) was first used for the 1990-1991 school year, as an electrical fire destroyed the school's original administration headquarters. The main building (the 5000 Building) houses most of the high school academic classes there, as well as both the high school and college administration units, dance studios, theaters, and art studios. The MDC Wolfson Science building (the 2000 Building, located at 300 NE 2nd Avenue) houses the science facilities. All music classes are held across the street from the MDC Wolfson Building at the aptly named Music Building (the 4000 Building, located at 401 NE 2nd Avenue; also houses MDC's Literary Center).

== High school admissions and enrollment ==
Admission to New World School of the Arts is determined by a performance audition or a portfolio review. For detailed information, see the audition requirements for each division on its website. It serves as both a college and a high school; it is the only high school conservatory in Miami-Dade County. NWSA continued the PAVAC model of admission based entirely on audition. This differs from other Miami-Dade County Public School (MDCPS) magnets which are not VPA (visual and performing arts) magnets, which have a mixed model of entrance eligibility requirements and lottery. Also unlike the other MDCPS magnets, but like other VPA magnets, it does not have the "sibling rule", a policy of giving priority if a student's sibling is already attending the magnet school.

In 2011, 1,268 students applied for admission to New World, competing for 140 available spots. This gives New World an 11% admissions rate, making it one of Miami's most competitive public high schools.

School demographics for 2009–10 were 35% male and 65% female; 42% Hispanic (of any race), 36% White non-Hispanic, 19% Black, 3% Asian, and less than 1% other.

== Notable alumni ==
- Mollye Asher, Academy Award-winning producer (Nomadland)
- Michael Aronov, Tony Award-winning actor (Oslo)
- Hernan Bas, artist
- Robert Battle, choreographer, artistic director of the Alvin Ailey American Dance Theater
- Jennifer R. Blake, actress (Behaving Badly)
- Andréa Burns, stage actress
- Dennis Calero, artist, Harvey Award-nominated comic book illustrator
- Jencarlos Canela, actor, singer, composer, model
- Autumn Casey, multimedia artist
- Bernard Chang, graphic novel illustrator
- Alexis Cole, jazz singer
- Billy Corben, documentary film director (Cocaine Cowboys, The U)
- Cote de Pablo, actress, recording artist (NCIS)
- Masha Dashkina Maddux, former principal dancer at the Martha Graham Dance Company
- David Del Rio, stage and television actor (The Troop)
- Lili Estefan, model and talk show host (El Gordo y la Flaca)
- Katie Finneran, Tony Award-winning actress
- Brandon Flynn, actor in 13 Reasons Why
- Glenn Howerton, actor (It's Always Sunny in Philadelphia)
- Alex Lacamoire, Grammy Award and Tony Award-winning orchestrator and producer (In the Heights); (Hamilton)
- John Paul Leon, Eisner Award-nominated illustrator
- Erik Liberman, Broadway and TV actor, author
- Josie Lopez, actress (Make It or Break It)
- Ally Love, host of the Brooklyn Nets and a Peloton fitness instructor
- Tarell Alvin McCraney, co-writer of Moonlight, Academy Award winner, chair of playwriting at the Yale School of Drama
- Mia Michaels, Emmy Award-winning choreographer (So You Think You Can Dance)
- Ali Prosch, artist
- Samantha Robinson, actress (The Love Witch)
- Cesar Santos, artist best known for coining the art term syncretism
- Alexis Scheer, playwright
- Sarah Spiegel, singer-actress
- Jen Stark, artist
- Marcus Strickland, jazz saxophonist
- Jessica Sutta, singer-songwriter, dancer, actress (The Pussycat Dolls)
- Russell Thomas, opera singer
- Lulu Wang, filmmaker (The Farewell)

== See also ==
- Miami-Dade County Public Schools
- Magnet school
- Education in the United States
