= Good Night, Oscar =

2023 play by Doug Wright

- 2023 Broadway production playbill
- Written by: Doug Wright
- Based on: A 1958 episode of The Tonight Show
- Genre: Comedy-Drama

Premiere
- Date: March 12, 2022
- Place: Goodman Theatre

Good Night, Oscar is a comedy-drama play written by American playwright Doug Wright. The story revolves around a fictional event in which pianist and humorist Oscar Levant, portrayed by Sean Hayes, appears on The Tonight Show with Jack Paar. The production received critical acclaim with Hayes winning the Tony Award for Best Actor in a Play.

The original production began previews at the Belasco Theatre on April 7, 2023, and premiered on April 24, closing on August 27, 2023, after 126 performances.

== Synopsis ==
The show follows a 1958 episode of The Tonight Show, where host Jack Paar has as a guest comedian Oscar Levant.

== Production history ==
The play first premiered in 2022 at the Goodman Theatre in Chicago, with Sean Hayes as Oscar Levant and directed by Lisa Peterson. The production ran from March 12 until April 24, 2022.

Following the Chicago run, the Broadway production rehearsals began on March 13, 2023. The production opened April 24, 2023. It also featured set design by Rachel Hauck, costume design by Emilio Sosa, lighting design by Carolina Ortiz Herrera and Ben Stanton, sound design by Andre Pluess, music supervision by Chris Fenwick, and wig, hair, and make-up design by J. Jared Janas. At the 76th Tony Awards, the show received three nominations and Hayes was awarded Best Leading Actor in a Play.

The production transferred to the Barbican Centre, London from 31 July 2025 to 21 September 2025 with Hayes reprising his role as Levant.

== Notable casts ==
Characters	Goodman Theatre	Broadway	West End
Characters	2022	2023	2025
Oscar Levant	Sean Hayes	Sean Hayes	Sean Hayes
June Levant	Emily Bergl	Emily Bergl	Rosalie Craig
Alvin Finney	Tramell Tillman	Marchánt Davis	Daniel Adeosun
Bob Sarnoff	Peter Grosz	Peter Grosz	Richard Katz
Jack Paar	Ben Rappaport	Ben Rappaport	Ben Rappaport
Max Weinbaum	Ethan Slater	Alex Wyse	Eric Sirakian
George Gershwin	John Zdrojeski	John Zdrojeski	David Burnett

== Reception ==
=== Critical response ===
The Chicago production received positive reviews from the Chicago Tribune, Chicago Sun-Times, Hyde Park Herald, and WTTW, among others, with Hayes' performance being especially noted. The Broadway production received mostly positive reviews. Christian Lewis of Variety praised Wright's dialogue writing, "In some ways, "Good Night, Oscar" even feels like an episode of The Marvelous Mrs. Maisel — zany, fast-paced and smartly humorous, with references flying a mile a minute, some battle-of-the-sexes content, sumptuous dresses, well-tailored suits and occasional moments of sincere emotion." The New York Daily News, on the other hand, lauded Hayes' "spectacularly intense and unstinting performance". Entertainment Weekly gave the production an A writing, "Aside from a few lulls in the early stages of exposition...the entire play is delightful, buoyed by its leading man's performance."

Some critics were more mixed with Jesse Green of The New York Times calling the play an "unconvincing biographical fantasia" and Hayes' performance "less an inhabitation of character than a nonstop loop of perfectly rendered facial tics, trembling hands and compulsive gestures." Johnny Oleksinski of The New York Post gave the play two out of four stars and called it "off-key" and "mostly unsatisfying."

== Awards and nominations ==
=== 2022 Chicago production ===
Year	Award	Category	Nominee	Result	Ref.
2022	Jeff Award	Outstanding Production of a Play	Good Night, Oscar	Won	
2022	Jeff Award	Outstanding New Work	Doug Wright	Won	
2022	Jeff Award	Director of a Play	Lisa Peterson	Nominated	
2022	Jeff Award	Performer in a Principal Role in a Play	Sean Hayes	Won	
2022	Jeff Award	Performer in a Supporting Role in a Play	Emily Bergl	Nominated	
2022	Jeff Award	Scenic Design - Large	Rachel Hauck	Won	
2022	Jeff Award	Sound Design - Large	André Pluess	Won	

=== 2023 Broadway production ===
Year	Award	Category	Nominee	Result	Ref.
2023	Tony Awards	Best Leading Actor in a Play	Sean Hayes	Won	
2023	Tony Awards	Best Costume Design in a Play	Emilio Sosa	Nominated	
2023	Tony Awards	Best Scenic Design in a Play	Rachel Hauck	Nominated	
2023	Drama Desk Awards	Outstanding Lead Performance in a Play	Sean Hayes	Won	
2023	Drama Desk Awards	Outstanding Supporting Performance in a Play	Emily Bergl	Nominated	
2023	Drama League Awards	Outstanding Production of a Play	Good Night, Oscar	Nominated	
2023	Drama League Awards	Distinguished Performance	Sean Hayes	Nominated	
2023	Outer Critics Circle Award	Outstanding New Broadway Play	Good Night, Oscar	Nominated	
2023	Outer Critics Circle Award	Outstanding Lead Performer in a Broadway Play	Sean Hayes	Won	
2023	Outer Critics Circle Award	Outstanding Sound Design	André Pluess	Nominated	

=== 2025 West End production ===
Year	Award	Category	Nominee	Result	Ref.
2026	Laurence Olivier Award	Best Actor	Sean Hayes	Nominated	
2026	Laurence Olivier Award	Outstanding Musical Contribution	Chris Fenwick and Sean Hayes	Won	

== Conception dispute ==
The conception of the origins of the play has been up for debate with playwright David Adjmi, claiming in a Facebook post that he had persuaded Hayes to portray Levant and was commissioned by producer Beth Williams to write a play for the actor. When Adjmi refused to "lighten the material," he said, Williams and Hayes held their option "in bad faith" to prevent him from further developing his play, while hiring Doug Wright to write a new play based on Adjmi's idea. The production team of Good Night, Oscar strongly rebutted Adjmi's claim in a press release which alleged Hayes and Williams had themselves gotten the idea to make Levant the center of a play in 2010, and culled Adjmi from a list of playwrights to write it. Adjmi then published an unverified email exchange on BroadwayWorld.com between himself and Hayes, in which he attempted to convince a reluctant Hayes to portray Levant.
