= Cinderella (Lloyd Webber musical) =

Musical by Andrew Lloyd Webber and David Zippel

Andrew Lloyd Webber's Cinderella
- Poster for the West End production
- Music: Andrew Lloyd Webber
- Lyrics: David Zippel
- Book: Emerald Fennell (original book); Alexis Scheer (Broadway adaptation)
- Basis: Cinderella by Charles Perrault and the Brothers Grimm
- Productions: 2021 West End; 2023 Broadway

Andrew Lloyd Webber's Cinderella, produced on Broadway as Bad Cinderella, is a musical with music by Andrew Lloyd Webber, lyrics by David Zippel, and a book by Emerald Fennell. Loosely adapted from the classic Cinderella story, the musical recasts gender relationships, explores the theme of beauty shaming, and Cinderella changes her appearance to secure love, but discovers it is better to be true to oneself. Plot changes include Cinderella being made a scapegoat by the town; the queen colluding with the stepmother; the prince inviting Cinderella to the ball; the prince's engagement to a stepsister (he never becomes king, as his long-lost older brother reappears); and the prince elopes with Cinderella, and they leave the town.

After beginning West End previews in June 2021, London performances were suspended due to COVID-19 outbreaks among the cast. The show ultimately opened in August 2021 to mostly positive reviews, and ran until June 2022. After some changes to the show, including changes to the book by Alexis Scheer, a Broadway transfer retitled Bad Cinderella opened in March 2023, following a month of preview performances. Reviews were largely negative, and after failing to receive any Tony Award nominations, the production closed in June 2023.

A concept album for the show was released in July 2021 and was nominated for a Grammy Award for Best Musical Theater Album.

== Synopsis ==
=== Act 1 ===
The town of Belleville, France, full of beautiful inhabitants, prepares to be awarded "Most Attractive Town" for the 50th year. The Queen's beloved, flawless, firstborn son, Prince Charming, has died in battle against a dragon; his younger brother, Prince Sebastian, is shy and gawky. The Queen builds a memorial statue in honor of Charming and the 50th year. At the award ceremony, the statue is presented but has been vandalised, causing Belleville to lose the prize and breaking their winning streak ("Buns 'N' Roses"). The townspeople blame the local misfit, Cinderella, a rebellious, goth, loud-mouthed maid ("It Has to Be Her"). They gag her and tie her to a tree in the woods ("Bad Cinderella"). Prince Sebastian, Cinderella’s only childhood friend, arrives to rescue her and teases her for getting tied to a tree again. They catch up and discuss Sebastian’s new status as heir to the throne, and Cinderella's hard childhood after her parents' deaths. After Cinderella leaves, Sebastian reveals that he secretly loves and misses her ("So Long").

At home, Cinderella's vain stepsisters, Adele and Marie, quarrel and complain that Cinderella makes their lives difficult; the Stepmother threatens to kick her out of the house if she causes any more trouble ("Unfair"). Cinderella hopes one day to run away from Belleville, but she stays because she loves Sebastian, though she feels unworthy of him ("Unbreakable"). Meanwhile, Sebastian goes to the Hunks' Gymnasium for his workout ("Hunks' Song"). In panic about the town losing the prize, the Queen decides that, to save the town's reputation, she must throw a Royal Ball on Saturday, inviting every girl in the kingdom; there Sebastian must choose a bride. She dismisses his objections and compares him unfavourably to his vanished brother, Charming ("Man’s Man").

In the town square, Sebastian tells Cinderella about the royal wedding and blames her for it. They argue, but Sebastian asks her to be at the Ball ("So Long" (reprise)). Sebastian wonders why he cannot tell Cinderella his true feelings ("Only You, Lonely You"). At the Palace, the Stepmother visits the Queen, and they recall their youth ("I Know You"). The Stepmother arranges to have either of her daughters marry Sebastian ("I Know You" (reprise)). Soon everyone in Belleville is on a shopping spree in the town square to prepare for the Ball. Sebastian gains popularity with the local girls. He sees Cinderella and again asks that she attend the Ball. The Stepmother suggests that Sebastian only invited her out of pity because of her dull looks ("The Village Square").

Later, the Stepmother and stepsisters prepare for the Ball. As Cinderella assists them, they mockingly insist that Sebastian could never choose her ("Unfair" (reprise)). Determined to go to the Ball, Cinderella visits the Godmother, a plastic surgeon, who has made the townsfolk look perfect ("The Godmother's Shop"). In exchange for Cinderella's mother's necklace, the Godmother provides a temporary cosmetic surgery make-over, with a beautiful gown and shoes made of crystal ("Beauty Has a Price"). She tells Cinderella that the pain of maintaining the look will be bearable only until midnight.

=== Act 2 ===
At the Ball ("The Cinderella Waltz"/"The Ball"), Prince Sebastian is annoyed by his suitresses and is anxious, as he must choose a bride by midnight. Cinderella arrives, magnificent but unrecognised. The Queen forces Sebastian to dance with her. Cinderella confesses that she is in love with him, but Sebastian tells her that he is waiting for someone. Cinderella becomes progressively more uncomfortable in her tight shoes. The Stepmother and Stepsisters soon recognize her, as Cinderella cannot walk in heels. The Stepmother forces Adele to kiss Sebastian at the stroke of midnight. She does so, and the Queen declares her Sebastian's bride. Sebastian finally recognises Cinderella, but she dismisses him, heartbroken. She rips her dress and wig off ("I Know I Have a Heart"). Sebastian is anguished that he hurt Cinderella. The Hunks mock-congratulate him ("Act 2, Scene 2"). In frustration, he defends himself and begins to act like a prince ("I Am No Longer Me").

At home, the Stepmother gloats over Adele's engagement as they prepare for the wedding. Marie is jealous ("Moment of Triumph"). The Stepmother mocks Cinderella for failing to see that Sebastian loves her ("What Were You Thinking?"). Cinderella despairs that she has lost her only best friend/love ("Far Too Late"). She starts packing her things to leave Belleville, but Marie encourages her to stop Sebastian and Adele's wedding, and tell Sebastian how she really feels ("Ego Has a Price" (reprise of "Beauty Has a Price")).

At the wedding ("The Wedding March"/"The Ceremony"), when the preacher asks for objections, Prince Charming (everyone is delighted to see him alive) stops the wedding to save Sebastian. To prevent his own arranged marriage, he faked his death and has returned to marry the love of his life. He comes out as gay and introduces his fiancé, the Duc de Violette ("Man's Man" (reprise)). While the Stepmother is devastated as her plan unravels, the Queen is overjoyed, since this marriage will return Belleville to splendour. She declares that henceforth Belleville will be the city of love; everyone in Belleville cheers for the new Kings ("Marry for Love"), as the wedding bells ring out. Cinderella hears the bells and thinks that Sebastian is married. Shattered, she finishes packing and heads out of Belleville ("Cinderella’s Soliloquy").

At the Palace, Prince Charming and his new husband celebrate a lavish wedding reception, but Sebastian is miserable. Marie tells him about Cinderella's plan to stop his wedding. Realising that she plans to leave town, he decides to go after Cinderella. The Stepmother accuses the Queen of breaching their deal, but the Queen threatens to execute the Stepmother and throws her out of the Palace ("The Wedding Party"). Sebastian sees that the Godmother has Cinderella's mother's necklace, and the Godmother gives it to him. Sebastian arrives at Cinderella's home to find only her crystal slippers. Luckily, Cinderella returns for the slippers (to sell them). Sebastian returns her necklace and tells her what happened; they both realise the error of their previous changes, and Sebastian decides to run away with Cinderella. They share a tender kiss (Finale).

== Musical numbers ==
Act 1

- "Buns 'n' Roses" – Townspeople, The Queen
- "It Has to Be Her" – Townspeople
- "Bad Cinderella" – Cinderella
- "So Long" – Sebastian, Cinderella
- "Unfair – Adele, Marie, The Stepmother
- "Unbreakable" – Cinderella
- "Hunks Song" – Hunks
- "Man's Man" – The Queen, Hunks
- "So Long" (reprise) – Cinderella, Prince Sebastian
- "Only You, Lonely You" – Sebastian
- "I Know You" – The Stepmother and The Queen
- "I Know You" (reprise) – The Queen, The Stepmother
- "The Village Square" – Townspeople, Hunks, The Stepmother
- "Unfair" (reprise) – Cinderella, The Stepmother, Adele, Marie
- "The Godmother's Shop" – Cinderella, Godmother
- "Beauty Has a Price" – Cinderella, Godmother

Act 2

- "Entr’acte" – Orchestra
- "Fanfare" – Orchestra
- "The Cinderella Waltz" – Orchestra
- "The Ball" – Sebastian, The Queen, Cinderella, The Stepmother
- "I Know I Have a Heart" – Cinderella
- "Act 2, Scene 2" – Sebastian, Hunks
- "I Am No Longer Me" – Sebastian, The Queen
- "Moment of Triumph" – The Stepmother, Adele, Marie
- "What Were You Thinking? – The Stepmother, Cinderella
- "Far Too Late" – Cinderella
- "Ego Has a Price" – Marie
- "The Wedding March" – Orchestra
- "Man's Man" (reprise) – Prince Charming
- "Marry for Love" – Charming, Hunks, The Queen, Guests
- "Cinderella's Soliloquy" – Cinderella
- "The Wedding Party" – Hunks, Guests Sebastian, Queen, Stepmother, Marie
- Finale – Sebastian, Cinderella.

Notes: In the 2023 Broadway production, the opening number was replaced by "Beauty Is Our Duty", sung by the Townspeople, "Unbreakable" was replaced by "Easy to Be Me," sung by Cinderella, and other songs changed their positions.

== Productions ==
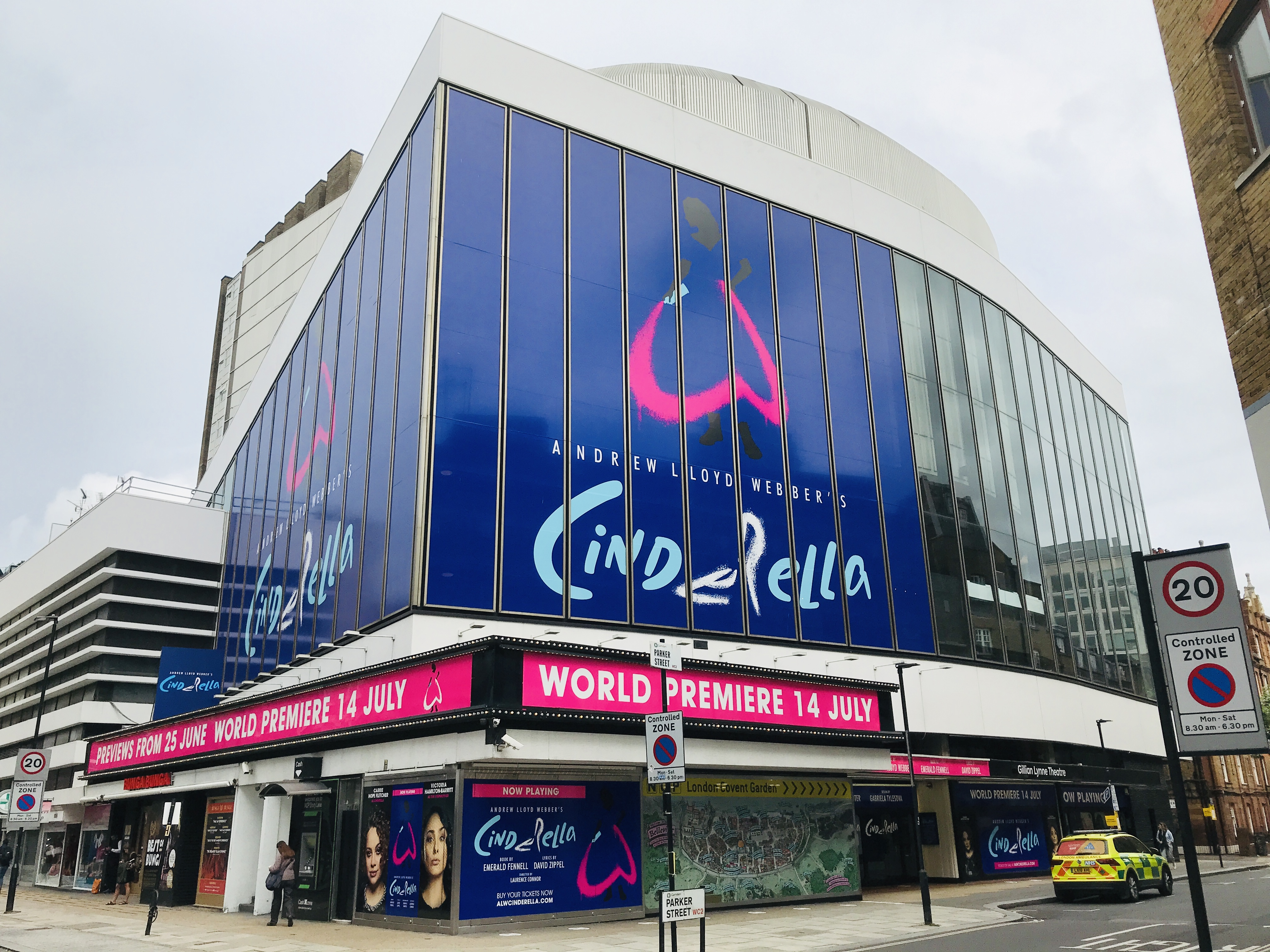
Cinderella at the Gillian Lynne Theatre in London's West End (July 2021)

=== West End (2021–2022) ===
The musical was workshopped at The Other Palace in London in May 2019 with Carrie Hope Fletcher in the title role, Tyrone Huntley as Prince Sebastian and Victoria Hamilton-Barritt as the Stepmother. The cast also included Rebecca Trehearn as Marie, Gary Wilmot as Jean, Ruthie Henshall as The Queen and Jonny Fines as Prince Charming. A single of Fletcher's rendition of the song "Bad Cinderella" was released on 30 October 2020 to warm reviews. The music video for the song was released on 10 December 2021.

Cinderella began previews at 50% capacity on 25 June 2021 at the Gillian Lynne Theatre in London's West End. The opening, originally scheduled for August 2020, was delayed due to the COVID-19 pandemic. After beginning previews, the production was scheduled to open on 20 July, but on 18 July a cast member tested positive for Covid-19; performances were suspended, and the official opening was postponed again. Performances resumed with an official opening on 18 August. The production was directed by Laurence Connor and choreographed by JoAnn M. Hunter, with set and costume design by Gabriela Tylesova, sound design by Gareth Owen and lighting by Bruno Poet. Fletcher and Hamilton-Barrit created the roles of Cinderella and the Stepmother, with Trehearn as The Queen (instead of her workshop role). Ivano Turco created the role of Prince Sebastian.

Some of the cast and crew members who were not present at the matinee on 1 May 2022 were not informed of the show's closure before it was publicly announced, leading to criticism and protests. The production closed on 12 June 2022 after a 12-month run. Lloyd Webber received further criticism when he referred to the show as a "costly mistake". He later clarified: "I am very sorry if my words have been misunderstood. ... I am incredibly, incredibly proud of Cinderella ... the mistake we made was trying to open too early, meaning we had to postpone twice. Everything we did was to try and support the West End and get everyone back to work after the [pandemic]."

=== Broadway (2023) ===
A Broadway production of the musical, with Linedy Genao as the title character, under the new title Bad Cinderella, began previews at the Imperial Theatre on 17 February 2023 and opened officially on 23 March 2023. Connor and Hunter directed and choreographed the production. Revisions to the book were written by Alexis Scheer, and the London design team also designed the Broadway production. A single of Genao's version of the title song, "Bad Cinderella", was released in October 2022. To promote the musical, Genao and Lloyd Webber performed the song on the Today show in October 2022 and March 2023. The cast also included Jordan Dobson as Prince Sebastian, Grace McLean as the Queen, Carolee Carmello as the Stepmother, Sami Gayle as Adele and Morgan Higgins as Marie. Christina Acosta Robinson played the Godmother, and Savy Jackson was the title role's alternate. Another song, "I Know I Have a Heart (Because You Broke It)", was released as a single on 10 February 2023. The production received mostly negative reviews, particularly focusing on the "muddled" script and lyrics.

The production closed on 4 June 2023, after 33 previews and 85 regular performances. The closing marked the end of a continuous 44-year period in which one or more of Lloyd Webber's shows played on Broadway.

== Cast and characters ==
Character	West End	Broadway
Character	2021	2023
Cinderella	Carrie Hope Fletcher	Linedy Genao
Alternate Cinderella	Georgina Onuorah	Savy Jackson
Prince Sebastian	Ivano Turco	Jordan Dobson
The Queen	Rebecca Trehearn	Grace McLean
The Stepmother	Victoria Hamilton-Barritt	Carolee Carmello
The Godmother	Gloria Onitiri	Christina Acosta Robinson
Adele	Laura Baldwin	Sami Gayle
Marie	Georgina Castle	Morgan Higgins
Prince Charming	Caleb Roberts	Cameron Loyal

== Reception ==
Chris Wiegand, in The Guardian, rated the original West End production of Cinderella 5 stars in his review, writing:

The original story ... by Fennell [has] heart and a torrent of barbed wit, exposing the faulty morals in traditional fairytales. ... Zippel's crystalline lyrics are ... cheekily satirical yet wistful and uplifting. ... Lloyd-Webber's richly enjoyable [numbers] range from grand waltzes, courtly processionals and marches to deftly pastiched and deeply felt romanticism, power-balladry, a splash of chanson and rollicking guitar riffs. Bewitching melodies abound: some refrains are practically iridescent. ...

Wiegand thought Fletcher and Turco "equally excellent", called Onitiri "fantastic", and praised Trehearn, the principals generally, the designs and the choreography. He concludes, "It adds up to not so much a ball as a blast: terrifically OTT and silly but warm and inclusive, with relatable, down-to-earth heroes and pertinent points about our quest for perfection and our expectations of each other and ourselves." The Times, The Telegraph, The New York Times and most other reviews also commented positively, but Johnny Oleksinski, writing in the New York Post, had a mixed reaction. Although he liked the cast and Lloyd-Webber's score, he bemoaned the show’s "joylessness", criticizing the book and direction, and suggesting that the "plodding" production be cut by half an hour.

By contrast, Bad Cinderella on Broadway in 2023 received largely negative reviews. Jesse Green of The New York Times said the show was "surprisingly vulgar, sexed-up and dumbed-down: a parade of hustling women in bustiers and shirtless pec-rippling hunks." Naveen Kumar of Variety referred to it as "a muddled and momentum-less retooling of the familiar fairy tale in search of a coherent point of view as if it were a glass-slippered foot." Oleksinski of The New York Post gave the show only one star out of four, calling it "a mess with multiple personality disorder. From start to finish during this perplexing and often dull fairytale spin – and, oh, does it spin – you’re never entirely sure what you’re watching or why you’re watching it." In a mixed opinion, Emlyn Travis of Entertainment Weekly gave the show a "B" grade; she liked some of the performances but remarked that "nothing could save [the show's] overall storyline from slowly and sadly disintegrating like a pumpkin carriage after midnight."

== Concept album ==
A concept album of the show was released on 9 July 2021 on Polydor Records, featuring Fletcher, Turco, Hamilton-Barritt and special guests including Adam Lambert as Prince Charming, Helen George as The Queen, cameo appearances of Sarah Brightman and Emerald Fennell, and a bonus track version of "Only You, Lonely You" performed by Todrick Hall. The recording also includes the song "The Vanquishing of the Three-Headed Sea Witch", performed by Lambert as Prince Charming, which was cut before the original production. The album does not include the Entr'acte at the start of Act 2 (a reprise of the musical themes from the first act), or the Bows section after the finale (a musical reprise of The Wedding Party/Bad Cinderella/I Know I Have a Heart).

It was nominated for the Grammy Award for Best Musical Theater Album.

== Awards and nominations ==
=== Original London production ===
Year	Award	Category	Nominee	Result
2022	WhatsOnStage Awards	Best New Musical		Nominated
2022	WhatsOnStage Awards	Best Performer in a Male Identifying Role in a Musical	Ivano Turco	Nominated
2022	WhatsOnStage Awards	Best Performer in a Female Identifying Role in a Musical	Carrie Hope Fletcher	Won
2022	WhatsOnStage Awards	Best Supporting Performer in a Female Identifying Role in a Musical	Victoria Hamilton-Barritt	Nominated
2022	WhatsOnStage Awards	Best Supporting Performer in a Female Identifying Role in a Musical	Rebecca Trehearn	Nominated
2022	WhatsOnStage Awards	Best Costume Design	Gabriela Tylesova	Nominated
2022	WhatsOnStage Awards	Best Lighting Design	Bruno Poet	Nominated
2022	Laurence Olivier Awards	Best Actress in a Supporting Role in a Musical	Victoria Hamilton-Barritt	Nominated
2022	Grammy Awards	Best Musical Theater Album	Carrie Hope Fletcher, Ivano Turco, Victoria Hamilton-Barritt & Helen George (principal soloists), Andrew Lloyd Webber, Nick Lloyd Webber & Greg Wells (producers), Andrew Lloyd Webber & David Zippel (composers/lyricists)	Nominated
