= Ali Prosch =

American artist (born 1979)

- Born: 1979 (age 46–47); Fairfax, California
- Education: BFA, New World School of the Arts; MFA, California Institute of the Arts
- Known for: Sculpture, performance
- Website: Official website

Ali Prosch (born 1979, Fairfax, California) is an American visual artist working on sculpture, video, and performance. She lives in Los Angeles.

== Early life and education ==
Prosch was born in Fairfax county, CA, in 1979, and was raised between her mother's community in South Florida and her father's in Northern California. While growing up she took dance, piano and drawing classes.

The artist holds a BFA from New World School of the Arts (2003) in Miami, and an MFA in Studio Arts from the California Institute of the Arts (2007–2009).

== Work ==
Ali Prosch's artistic practice embraces mixed media sculptures and installations, as well as time-based media to engage with topics on femininity, bodily autonomy, collective and personal trauma, loss, and grief.

In the early stages of her career, her work Untitled (Beaded Doorway), was presented at Locust Projects, Miami, in 2007. Prosch's work has been featured in shows at Glendale College Art Gallery, University of California, Santa Barbara, Smithsonian Hirshhorn Museum and Sculpture Garden, Washington D.C., University of Texas, Georgia State University, The Museum of Contemporary Art (North Miami).

In 2016 her work was part of Now Be Here, an initiative organized by New York gallery Hauser & Wirth showcasing the work of nearly 700 women artists and non-binary people. The exhibition traveled to the Brooklyn Museum, New York, and the Pérez Art Museum Miami, Florida, and later to the National Museum of Women in the Arts, Washington D.C. Her work entered the collections of the Pérez Art Museum Miami thereafter.

Her 2018 solo exhibition Come Undone at Los-Angeles art space Bed and Breakfast, was reviewed by critic Jennifer Remenchick from Contemporary Art Review, Los Angeles: " All the pieces perform a kind of imitation, embodying the skin rather than the substance of the items they purport to depict. This flesh-like association is only further emphasized by the pervasive look and smell of latex, a material used in all the exhibition’s works." The performance public program related to the exhibition was co-curated with professional choreographer Jacqueline Falcone.

In 2022 Prosch's work was featured in the What if the Matriarchy Was Here All Along? group show in the main library at Altadena Libraries in California. Her work was also included in the inaugural show at Xela Institute of Art, Long Beach in 2023.

She is the creator and co-host of the program Performing Aspen, a community-based project expanding conversations among art practioneers such as musicians, visual artists, performers, and others.
