= Fabiola Arias =

Cuban American fashion designer

Fabiola Arias is a Cuban American fashion designer based in New York City.

== Early life and education ==
Arias was born on June 19, 1987, in Havana, Cuba. Her mother is Cuban designer Anilu Oms, from whom Arias learned the art of design. Arias has incorporated her mother's Fascinator headpieces into her collection. Arias also cites the influence of her father, a journalist with a love of 1950s Hollywood, in her designs.

Arias attended high school at Miami's Design and Architecture High School. She cites the influence of her painting, drawing and sculpture studies as major influences in her design work.

In Fall 2006, Arias moved to New York City to attend the Parsons where she studied Fashion Design. As a student, Arias interned for Narciso Rodriguez and Marc Jacobs.

== Career ==
In 2008, while still a senior at Parsons, Arias started her own company. The first store to pick up her line was Ikram in Chicago. After graduating Parsons, Arias presented her first collection during New York Fashion Week. Her presentation won her a contract with Neiman Marcus where her Spring 2010 gowns were placed in their couture salon. Neiman Marcus featured one of Arias's gowns on their March 2010 catalogue cover. The collection is now carried in eight Neiman Marcus couture salons across the country.

In 2009, Arias won a sponsorship from the Japanese designer incubator Shinmai Creator's Project. Only four designers are chosen each year from around the world. The jury was the President and Representative Director of Chanel in Japan, Chief Editor of the Elle Magazine Paris and the President of Issey Miyake. Winning the sponsorship allowed her to present her Fall 2011 collection at Japan Fashion Week in Tokyo.

In 2011 Fashion Group International awarded Arias with the "Rising Star" award in their Womenswear category. Arias won Chicago's Gold Coast award when she presented her Fall 2011 collection in front of an audience of 1,300 at the Hilton Chicago. Vanidades honored Arias at their Icons of Style Gala as Best Young Designer.
