= Alexis Scheer =

American playwright

- Born: South Miami, Florida, U.S.
- Education: Boston Conservatory at Berklee (B.F.A.); Boston University (M.F.A.)
- Occupations: Playwright; Screenwriter
- Writing career
- Period: 2018-present

Alexis Scheer is an American playwright.

== Early life and education ==
Scheer was born in South Miami, Florida, where she grew up in a middle-class household. Her mother emigrated to the U.S. from Medellín, Colombia. Her father is of Eastern European Jewish descent. She became interested in acting, music, and playwriting at a young age. She graduated from New World School of the Arts in Miami in 2010, and holds a Bachelor of Fine Arts in musical theater from the Boston Conservatory and a Master of Fine Arts in playwriting from Boston University.

== Career ==
Her play Our Dear Dead Drug Lord was first produced in Boston by Scheer's own Off the Grid Theatre Company in 2018, for which she was named The Improper Bostonian's Rising Theatre Star of 2018. The show then played off-Broadway in 2019, produced by the WP Theater and Second Stage Theater.

For her thesis at Boston University, she wrote Laughs in Spanish, which premiered in 2019 at Boston Playwrights' Theatre, next playing in 2022 at the Denver Center for the Performing Arts and was performed at GableStage in 2024 in Coral Gables, Florida.

She made her Broadway debut in 2023, working on revisions to the book of Andrew Lloyd Webber's version of Cinderella], previously in the West End, which was retitled Bad Cinderella. Her play Breaking the Story premiered off-Broadway at Second Stage Theater in June 2024.

Scheer was a writer on the first season of Pretty Little Liars: Original Sin.

== Works ==
- Our Dear Dead Drug Lord (2018)
- Laughs in Spanish (2019)
- Breaking the Story (2024)
