= On Your Feet! =

2015 jukebox Broadway musical

- The Story of Emilio & Gloria Estefan
- Playbill cover for the original Broadway production
- Music: Emilio Estefan; Gloria Estefan; Miami Sound Machine
- Lyrics: Emilio Estefan; Gloria Estefan
- Book: Alexander Dinelaris Jr.
- Basis: The life and music of Gloria Estefan
- Premiere: June 2, 2015: Oriental Theatre, Chicago
- Productions: 2015 Chicago; 2015 Broadway; 2017 US National Tour; 2017 Netherlands; 2019 West End; 2019 UK tour

On Your Feet! is a jukebox musical that played on Broadway at the Marquis Theatre. Based on the lives and music of 26-time Grammy Award-winning husband-and-wife team Gloria and Emilio Estefan, the musical has a book written by Alexander Dinelaris Jr. and a score built around the Cuban-fusion pop music made famous by Gloria Estefan. The songs featured include "Get on Your Feet," "Conga," "1-2-3," and "Rhythm Is Gonna Get You." The musical also features the original song "If I Never Got to Tell You" with lyrics by Gloria Estefan and music by her daughter Emily Estefan.

After playing on Broadway for two years, Gloria Estefan announced there are several international productions in the works. The Dutch adaptation was the first to launch. In the presence of Gloria and Emilio Estefan, a fully Dutch cast performed the musical for the first time in Utrecht, Netherlands on October 17, 2017. International tours and sit down productions have also been announced for Germany, Italy, Mexico, Japan and France.

After a pre-Broadway engagement in Chicago during the summer of 2015, On Your Feet! opened on Broadway on November 5, 2015. It opened to positive reviews and box office success. The musical received seven Outer Critics Circle Award nominations, three Drama League Award nominations and a Tony Award nomination for Best Choreography at the 70th Tony Awards.

A film adaptation is in development as of April 2024.

== Production history ==
=== Chicago (2015) ===
The musical had its world premiere at the Oriental Theatre in Chicago from June 2, 2015 – July 5, 2015 (directed by Jerry Mitchell and choreographed by Sergio Trujillo). The cast featured Ana Villafañe as Gloria Estefan and Josh Segarra as Emilio Estefan.

=== Broadway (2015-2017) ===
Previews began on October 5, 2015, at the Marquis Theatre with Mitchell and Trujillo as director and choreographer respectively. The musical officially opened on November 5, 2015. The opening cast of 31 performers was led by Ana Villafañe as Gloria Estefan, Josh Segarra as Emilio Estefan, Andréa Burns as Gloria Fajardo, Alma Cuervo as Consuelo García, Alexandria Suaréz as Little Gloria and Eduardo Hernandez as Young Emilio. Linedy Genao played Rachel and also understudied the role of Gloria. Designers include David Rockwell (sets), Emilio "Esosa" Sosa (costumes) and Kenneth Posner (lighting). In July 2016, Puerto Rican singer and actor Ektor Rivera replaced Segarra as Emilio. The production celebrated 500 performances on January 19, 2017. The production closed on Broadway on August 20, 2017, after 34 previews and 746 regular performances. The sets and props were shipped to The Netherlands and were used in the Dutch production.

=== Netherlands (2017-2018) ===
The first production outside America started previews on October 17, 2017, in the Netherlands. The production is produced by Stage Entertainment and played at the Beatrix Theater with performances until August 5, 2018. The songs are in their original language, whereas the dialogue has been translated to Dutch by Allard Blom. The cast features Vajèn van den Bosch as Gloria Estefan, Jim Bakkum / Tommie Christiaan as Emilio Estefan, Nurlaila Karim as Gloria Fajardo and Ellen Evers as Consuelo García.

=== U.S. Tour (2017-2019) ===
A US tour began in the fall of 2017 and premiered in Buffalo, New York. The tour had stops in the following cities:

- Baltimore, Maryland
- Boston, Massachusetts
- Buffalo, New York
- Cleveland, Ohio
- Costa Mesa, California
- Dallas, Texas
- Denver, Colorado
- Des Moines, Iowa
- Detroit, Michigan
- Durham, North Carolina
- East Lansing, Michigan
- Greenville, South Carolina
- Houston, Texas
- Kansas City, Missouri
- Los Angeles, California
- Memphis, Tennessee
- Orlando, Florida
- Philadelphia, Pennsylvania
- Portland, Oregon
- Providence, Rhode Island
- Rochester, New York
- St. Louis, Missouri
- San Antonio, Texas
- San Diego, California
- San Francisco, California
- Schenectady, New York
- Tampa, Florida
- Washington, D.C.

Emilio and Gloria Estefan announced the tour at a press event in Miami, Florida, on February 6, 2017. Christie Prades, a Broadway understudy for Gloria, had been announced to play the lead role on the tour. The tour embarked on an 80-week national tour, which started in Buffalo, New York on September 22, 2017, and reached 60 other cities by 2019. Other stops on the tour included Miami—the Estefans' hometown—with an opening on October 5, 2017, and long engagements in certain cities.

=== West End (2019) ===
On Your Feet opened in the West End in June 2019 at the London Coliseum. This was a limited engagement from 14 June 2019 to 31 August 2019, before a tour of the UK and Ireland. The cast features Christie Prades as Gloria and George Ioannides as Emilio.

=== International productions ===
International productions of the show are in development, as well as a possible international tour. Sit down productions are planned for Spain, Italy, Germany, Japan, Saltillo, Mexico, France and Switzerland.

== Synopsis ==
=== Act I ===
A dance number from Gloria Estefan's dancers leads to backstage with Gloria, Emilio Estefan, and their son, Nayib before a concert in 1990 ("Rhythm Is Gonna Get You").

In a flashback, Gloria is younger, playing the guitar and singing to send a recording to her father, José Fajardo, who is stationed in Vietnam. ("Cuando Salí de Cuba"). Gloria grows up in the Little Havana neighborhood of Miami, with her mother, Gloria Fajardo, and grandmother, Consuelo García. During the dance number, Gloria is shown as older ("Tradición").

As time progresses, Gloria is introduced by her grandmother to Emilio Estefan, who is a part of a group, then called the Miami Latin Boys. Emilio invites Gloria to perform one of the songs she has written at their upcoming rehearsal. Gloria, who is studying to be a psychologist and spending most of her extra time caring for her father through his battle with multiple sclerosis, is initially resistant to the idea of performing. With pressure from her grandmother, she attends the rehearsals, despite push-back from her mother. She brings her sister, Rebecca Fajardo, mother, and grandmother the day of. Gloria performs and has her sister come with her on stage for "emotional support," ("Anything for You"). Despite initially being shy, and not wanting to be in the spotlight, she finds her place after being given advice from Emilio ("1-2-3"). Gloria realizes she is falling for Emilio, and Emilio is feeling the same way ("I See Your Smile").

Gloria's mother is initially not on board with Gloria joining the Miami Latin Boys (renamed the Miami Sound Machine), and when Gloria is frustrated that her mother doesn't like Emilio, Consuelo tells her that when her mother was younger she wanted to be a singer too. Gloria Fajardo was offered a contract with Twentieth Century Fox to be the Spanish voice of Shirley Temple, but her father forbade it. A flashback follows, of Gloria Fajardo performing in a club and finds out during the performance she learns she has to flee Cuba without her love, José Fajardo. ("Mi Tierra")

Later, Gloria and Emilio propose a new song to Phil, a record label executive, but he refuses to publish it because it is in English. Then, on July 4, Emilio and Gloria go on a date where Gloria kisses Emilio for the first time. ("Con Los Años Que Me Quedan"). They try to discuss the single, but Gloria is lost in Emilio, and her love for him ("Here We Are"). Gloria is spending time with her father, José Fajardo, and although he cannot speak, she wishes she could hear what he would say about Emilio. She imagines the advice he would give her ("When Someone Comes into Your Life"). Gloria then writes a song using the encores they played on tour in Holland, with all the lyrics in English. Executive Chris is initially not backing it, and won't propose it to Phil, so they have to "bring Phil to the song," before they can release it. Gloria initially performs her new song at a Bar Mitzvah for a boy named Jeremy, and Phil refuses to attend. Then she performs it at an Italian wedding, and Phil still will not come. It is not until she performs it at a Shriners convention in Las Vegas that Phil wants to attend ("Conga").

=== Act II ===
Gloria and Emilio hit the top of the music charts and launch a worldwide tour ("Get on Your Feet"). Gloria is thankful for the fact that her grandmother Consuelo had encouraged her to pursue a music career and even calls Consuelo on stage during one of her performances ("Live for Loving You"). However, Gloria also struggles with the exhausting schedule, and the fact that her mother has become estranged due to her disapproval (and potential jealousy) of Gloria's fame ("You'll Be Mine (Party Time)"). Even though Gloria is exhausted and wants to take a couple of days off, Emilio encourages her to take on one other concert in Syracuse. On the road, the Estefans' bus collides with a semi truck during a snowstorm ("Famous").

Gloria breaks her back in the accident, and is flown to New York City for emergency spinal surgery. Gloria's mother rushes to the hospital after hearing about Gloria's accident on the news and she and Emilio bond over their love for Gloria ("If I Never Got to Tell You"). Emilio worries Gloria might not survive the surgery ("Don't Wanna Lose You"). During her surgery, Gloria imagines seeing her late father José and her grandmother Consuelo, who had died a couple of months before ("Wrapped"). They both encourage her to live. After coming out of surgery, Gloria finally reconciles with her mother. Doctors tell Gloria she may never walk again, but she dedicates herself to rehabilitation.

Thousands of fan letters, and Emilio's steadfast determination, provide her the encouragement she needs to get back on her feet ("Reach"). Gloria makes a triumphant return to the stage with her performance at the 1991 American Music Awards ("Coming Out of the Dark").

== Musical numbers ==
Act I

- "Rhythm Is Gonna Get You" — Gloria, Company
- "Cuando Salí de Cuba" — Little Gloria
- "Tradición" — Little Gloria, Gloria, Company
- "Anything For You" — Gloria, Rebecca
- "1-2-3" — Gloria, Company
- "I See Your Smile" — Gloria, Emilio, Company
- "Mi Tierra" — Gloria Fajardo, Company
- "Con Los Años Que Me Quedan" — Guitarristas
- "Here We Are" — Gloria, Emilio, Guitarristas
- "Dr. Beat" † — Company
- "When Someone Comes Into Your Life" — José, Gloria
- "Conga" — Gloria, Company

Act II

- "Get on Your Feet" — Gloria, Company
- "Live for Loving You" — Gloria, Company
- "You'll Be Mine (Party Time)" — Gloria, Company
- "Oye Mi Canto" — Gloria, Company
- "Cuba Libre" — Gloria, Company
- "Famous" — Gloria
- "If I Never Got to Tell You" ‡ — Gloria Fajardo, Emilio
- "Wrapped" — Gloria, Little Gloria, José, Emilio, Company
- "Don't Wanna Lose You" — Emilio, Company
- "Reach" — Company
- "Coming Out of the Dark" — Gloria, Company
- "Mega Mix"
  - "Rhythm Is Gonna Get You" — Gloria, Little Gloria, Company
  - "Oye" — Gloria Fajardo, Company
  - "Conga" — Consuelo, José, Company
  - "Turn the Beat Around" — Rebecca, Emilio, Company
  - "Everlasting Love" — Gloria, Emilio, Company
  - "Get on Your Feet" — Company

† Not included in the cast recording.

‡ Original song written for the show by Gloria Estefan (lyrics) and Emily Estefan (music).

== Principal roles and casts ==
=== Principal roles ===
Character	Original Broadway Cast (2015)	First U.S. Tour Cast (2017)	Dutch Cast (2017)	West End Cast (2019)	Original Regional Cast (2024)
Gloria Estefan	Ana Villafañe	Christie Prades	Vajèn van den Bosch	Christie Prades, Philippa Stefani	Iliana Marie Garcia
Emilio Estefan	Josh Segarra	Mauricio Martínez	Jim Bakkum	George Ioannides	
Emilio Estefan	Josh Segarra	Mauricio Martínez	Tommie Christiaan	George Ioannides	Ángel Lozada
Gloria Fajardo	Andréa Burns	Nancy Ticotin	Nurlaila Karim	Madalena Alberto	Miss YaYa Vargas
Consuelo García	Alma Cuervo	Alma Cuervo	Ellen Evers	Karen Mann	Barbara Bonilla
José Fajardo	Eliseo Román	Jason Martinez	Frank van Hengel	Elia Lo Tauro	Adriel Orlando Garcia
Rebecca Fajardo	Genny Lis Padilla	Claudia Yanez	Sky Lemmer	Francesca Lara Gordon	Amanda Arjona
Little Gloria	Alexandria Suarez	Amaris Sanchez	Éowyn Arts, Robin de Haas, Billy, Idaila, Neeltje, Yuna	Klaudia Gjergji, Holly McDonagh, Emilly Perra.	Sofia Brown
Little Gloria	Fabi Aguirre	Carmen Sanchez	Éowyn Arts, Robin de Haas, Billy, Idaila, Neeltje, Yuna	Klaudia Gjergji, Holly McDonagh, Emilly Perra.	
Young Emilio Nayib Jeremy	Eduardo Hernandez	Jordan Vergara	Thibault van der Does, Jeshian van Doorn, Luca Orlando, Roemer Vonk, Ricardo Willems	Santiago Huertas Ruiz, Jonathan Naranjo, Alejandro Puentes Motato.	Jules Presley, Allan Reyes
Young Emilio Nayib Jeremy	Kevin Tellez	Kevin Tellez	Thibault van der Does, Jeshian van Doorn, Luca Orlando, Roemer Vonk, Ricardo Willems	Santiago Huertas Ruiz, Jonathan Naranjo, Alejandro Puentes Motato.	Jules Presley, Allan Reyes

Notable Broadway replacements

- Ektor Rivera took over the role of Emilio beginning on July 12, 2016. Mauricio Martínez temporarily replaced Rivera in the role of Emilio on Broadway from July 10, 2017, to August 13, 2017. Rivera returned for the final week of the Broadway run.

== Critical response ==
In his review for The New York Times, Charles Isherwood wrote that "the recipe may be familiar, but the flavor is fresh in this undeniably crowd-pleasing musical." "Starring a vibrant Ana Villafañe as Ms. Estefan and a commanding Josh Segarra as her husband and musical collaborator, the musical neatly showcases the boppy dance-floor hits and swoony ballads that made Ms. Estefan and the band Miami Sound Machine a radio and MTV staple in the 1980s... On Your Feet! roars through the up-tempo numbers, choreographed with swirling skirts and swiveling hips by Sergio Trujillo. The very air in the room seems to vibrate when the crackerjack band strikes up. But with an often mechanical book, moving through its rags-to-riches paces as if to a rigid percussive beat, On Your Feet! ultimately falls somewhere in the middle of the hefty pack of jukebox musicals that have plugged in to Broadway's power strip."

David Rooney, in his review for The Hollywood Reporter, wrote, "Just try keeping the grin off your face when two massive human chains—of cast and audience members—flood the aisles of the Marquis Theatre... Charting the rise to international superstardom of Gloria Estefan, and her triumphant re-emergence after near-tragedy struck, On Your Feet! is an infectious account of the lives and careers of the Latin music crossover sensations... featuring a star-making lead performance from radiant newcomer Ana Villafañe. It's impossible to deny the production's generosity of spirit.... the story is packed with heart, above all in its tender depiction of the couple's sustaining love. And there's such genuine joy — plus a refreshing suggestion of modesty — in the telling of this Cuban-American success story. The show's arrival at a historic point in the renewal of diplomatic ties between Cuba and the U.S. makes its timing serendipitous."

Peter Marks, in his review for The Washington Post wrote "The buoyant Estefan songs... are rolled out with carbonated flair by director Jerry Mitchell and choreographer Sergio Trujillo. In the guise, too, of actor-singers Ana Villafañe and Josh Segarra, the redoubtable Estefans are evoked here with the requisite sexiness and effervescence; the book by Alexander Dinelaris...conveys vivaciously that theirs is a partnership in every sense....takes its place in the upper echelons of the jukebox genre..."

Before the Dutch version even started performing, the casting already faced some criticism. People found the casting of Dutch born Caucasian musical actors in the major roles of Gloria, Emilio and Consuelo "white washing". Producer Albert Verlinde responded by saying they used colourblind casting and eventually cast the best people that auditioned. The casting also was approved by Gloria and Emilio themselves. "

=== Box office ===
The New York Times reported, following the musical's first week of preview performances, "On Your Feet!, a jukebox musical about Gloria and Emilio Estefan, barrelled onto Broadway last week, grossing $970,013 in its first seven preview performances and suggesting that the show might be the first new hit since Hamilton." In December, the newspaper followed up with a report that the show was continuing to flourish at the box office in spite of a divisive presidential election season, "Immigration may be polarizing as a political issue, but on Broadway the immigrant stories are doing quite well...On Your Feet!, the new musical about Gloria and Emilio Estefan's journey from anonymity in Cuba to stardom in the United States, had its strongest showing yet last week, grossing $1,331,812. That production is now consistently among the top-grossing shows on Broadway, behind only Hamilton among works that opened this season."

Playbill noted, in the musical's first week in November 2015, " On Your Feet! which won good reviews last week, saw a leap of $123,518 and played to houses that were at 96% capacity..."

== Awards and nominations ==
Year	Award Ceremony	Category	Nominee	Result
2016	Tony Award	Best Choreography	Sergio Trujillo	Nominated
2016	Outer Critics Circle Award	Outstanding New Broadway Musical		Nominated
2016	Outer Critics Circle Award	Outstanding Book of a Musical	Alexander Dinelaris	Nominated
2016	Outer Critics Circle Award	Outstanding Actress in a Musical	Ana Villafañe	Nominated
2016	Outer Critics Circle Award	Outstanding Featured Actress in a Musical	Andréa Burns	Nominated
2016	Outer Critics Circle Award	Outstanding Choreographer	Sergio Trujillo	Won
2016	Outer Critics Circle Award	Outstanding Costume Design	Esosa	Nominated
2016	Outer Critics Circle Award	Outstanding Lighting Design	Kenneth Posner	Nominated
2016	Drama League Award	Outstanding Production of a Broadway or Off-Broadway Musical		Nominated
2016	Drama League Award	Distinguished Performance	Ana Villafañe	Nominated
2016	Theatre World Award	Outstanding Broadway or Off-Broadway Debut Performance	Ana Villafañe	Won
2016	Fred and Adele Astaire Award	Best Choreographer	Sergio Trujillo	Won
2016	Fred and Adele Astaire Award	Best Female Dancer	Ana Villafañe	Nominated
2016	Fred and Adele Astaire Award	Best Male Dancer	Carlos E. Gonzalez	Nominated
2016	Fred and Adele Astaire Award	Best Male Dancer	Luis Salgado	Nominated
2016	Fred and Adele Astaire Award	Outstanding Ensemble in a Broadway Show	David Baida, Henry Gainza, Linedy Genao, Carlos E. Gonzalez, Nina Lafarga, Omar Lopez-Cepero, Marielys Molina, Doreen Montalvo, Genny Lis Padilla, Liz Ramos, Eliseo Roman, Luis Salgado, Jennifer Sanchez, Marco Santana, Brett Sturgus, Eric Ulloa, Tanairi Sade Vazquez, Lee Zarrett	Nominated

== Film adaptation ==
On April 24, 2024, it was announced that a film adaptation is in early development at Sony Pictures and Davis Entertainment. Lissette Feliciano will direct from her own screenplay adaptation as her second feature-length film following her directorial debut Women Is Losers (2021). Gloria and Emilio Estefan and John Davis will produce, with John Fox executive producing. On October 17, 2025, it was announced that Rachel Zegler will play as Gloria Estefan.
