= Wonderland (musical) =

Musical by Jack Murphy and Gregory Boyd and Frank Wildhorn

- The Musical
- Wonderland pre-broadway logo
- Music: Frank Wildhorn
- Lyrics: Jack Murphy
- Book: Jack Murphy; Gregory Boyd; Ava Eldred (UK adaptation)
- Basis: Alice's Adventures in Wonderland; Through the Looking-Glass
- Productions: 2009 Tampa; 2010 Houston; 2011 Tampa; 2011 Broadway; 2012 Japan; 2013 Portugal; 2017 UK Tour; 2022 Tuacahn; 2024 Linz, Austria; 2026 Budapest

Wonderland, formerly called Wonderland: Alice's New Musical Adventure or Wonderland: A New Alice, is a musical play with a book by Jack Murphy and Gregory Boyd, lyrics by Murphy, and music by Frank Wildhorn. The story, a contemporary version of the novels Alice's Adventures in Wonderland (1865) and Through the Looking-Glass (1871) by Lewis Carroll, is set in New York City and focuses on writer Alice Cornwinkle and her 10-year-old daughter Chloe.

After various workshops and productions of the musical in Tampa, Florida and Houston, Texas, the show premiered on Broadway on April 17, 2011, closing a month later, on May 15, 2011.

== Major Productions ==
=== Preliminary workshops and readings ===
Frank Wildhorn and Jack Murphy previously collaborated on The Civil War, Waiting For The Moon, The Count of Monte Cristo, and the unproduced musical Havana, and have written songs for Linda Eder. Gregory Boyd has directed productions of Wildhorn's Svengali (for which he penned the lyrics), Jekyll & Hyde, and The Civil War (for which he contributed lyrics and dialogue with Murphy).

Wonderland is the first production mounted by the Broadway Genesis Project, whose goal is to help create new theatre works specifically for the Tampa Bay market, after which they may be staged in other performing arts centers or move to Broadway.

Wildhorn began working on the project in the late 1990s. He initially conceived an Alice similar to the one in the 1951 Disney animated feature and envisioned his then-fiancé, Brandi Burkhardt, in the title role, but as time passed, the two ended their engagement, and the role seemed to be passed to another Wildhorn leading lady Lauren Kennedy. In 2005, Wildhorn announced that the musical would premiere in 2006 in Europe, but this did not occur. The show was workshopped starring Burkhardt in the title role in Tampa, Florida in 2007, with a presentation of four songs (these still appear in the show in some form). The project then focused on the scripts, and TBPAC agreed to make the show its first project.

In the summer of 2007, at a "Wildhorn & Once More I Can See", with orchestra, and Wildhorn announced that the show would premiere in Tampa in 2009. The project had its first reading in Manhattan on March 20, 2009. It featured Lauren Kennedy as Alice, Julie Brooks as Chloe, Nikki Snelson as the Mad Hatter, and Julia Murney as the Queen.

=== Tampa and Houston (2009–2010) ===
Gregory Boyd was chosen to direct the production, Marguerite Derricks was chosen to choreograph, set designs were by Neil Patel, costume designs were by Susan Hilferty and lighting designs were by Paul Gallo. In April 2009, auditions were held in Manhattan and at what was then the Tampa Bay Performing Arts Center. Casting was complete by August. The cast included Janet Dacal as Alice, Karen Mason as the Queen of Hearts, Nikki Snelson as the Mad Hatter, Eugene Fleming as the Caterpillar, Jose Llana as El Gato, Edward Staudenmayer as the White Rabbit, Darren Ritchie as Jack/White Knight, and Julie Brooks as Chloe. The creative team also included projection designer Sven Ortel. Rehearsals began on October 12, 2009.

Wonderland began previews on November 24, 2009 and opened on December 5 at Ferguson Hall in The David A. Straz Jr. Center for the Performing Arts in Tampa, Florida, where it ran through January 3, 2010. The musical next moved to the Alley Theatre, Houston, starting in previews on January 15, 2010 and opening on January 20, running through February 14. The musical was budgeted at USD$3.3 million. According to a report by Straz Center, "the estimated local economic impact...is more than $8.1 million", and noted that "nearly 750 full and part-time jobs [were] impacted". The show played to 96% capacity in Tampa.

The production transferred to Houston, opening January 20, 2010 at the Alley Theatre, with previews beginning January 15. It closed on February 14, 2010. The book was rewritten after the Tampa engagement. At the time of the Houston opening, Boyd said: "The book we have now is quite different from the book that opened in Tampa. And we're putting in more changes, including four new songs." Producer Judy Lisi discussed the decisions being made about the show's next step: "Does it make sense to tour it first? Does it make sense to bring it in (to Broadway)? I really want to see how far we get in Houston to be able to determine the next stage of the development."

=== Tampa (2011) ===
The musical returned in a pre-Broadway engagement to Ferguson Hall at the Straz Center in Tampa, with performances running from January 5 through January 16, 2011.

The show had a new subtitle: Wonderland: A New Alice. A New Musical and the book was drastically re-written, the roles of the Caterpillar, Chloe and the Mad Hatter were recast (with E. Clayton Cornelius, Carly Rose Sonenclar and Kate Shindle), a character (Morris, the Hatter's side-kick, the March Hare) was added, and a character was deleted (Jabberwock). The revised score featured many of the new songs from the 2010 Houston production, as well as re-implementing the song "Don't Wanna Fall in Love", and adding two others.

=== Broadway (2011) ===
The musical premiered on Broadway at the Marquis Theatre on April 17, 2011, with previews beginning March 21. The cast included Janet Dacal as Alice, Darren Ritchie as White Knight and Jack/Lewis Carroll, Jose Llana as El Gato, Karen Mason as the Queen of Hearts, Kate Shindle as the Mad Hatter, Carly Rose Sonenclar as Chloe, and Edward Staudenmayer as the White Rabbit. Tituss Burgess was originally cast as the Caterpillar but was later replaced by E. Clayton Cornelious. Boyd directs, Derricks choreographs, and the design team is the same, except for the addition of sound designer Peter Hylenski.

On February 6, it was reported that the musical was US$10 million short of its $14 million captilization. The producers, however, announced that "The show is on schedule and we are very thrilled about the work that was done in Florida." The New York Post reported that several producers wanted to bring in additional help. The Nederlanders engaged Scott Ellis to restage the musical and Rupert Holmes to help shape the book. After negative reviews the production closed on May 15, 2011, after 31 previews and 33 performances. Masterworks Broadway released an original cast recording of the show on May 3, 2011. The album was recorded on March 6 during rehearsals and doesn't reflect the finalized versions of the Broadway production's music.

=== UK Tour (2017) ===
The musical had its European premiere at the Edinburgh Playhouse in January 2017, which marked the start of a UK tour. The production was directed by Lotte Wakeman with a revised book written by Ava Eldred The production starred Kerry Ellis as Alice, Wendi Peters as the Queen of Hearts, Natalie McQueen as the Mad Hatter and Dave Willetts as the White Rabbit. Originally Carolyn Maitland was cast to play alternate Alice and Mad Hatter. Maitland pulled out before rehearsals due to disagreements with the producer and the production company Wonderland the Musical Ltd regarding her contract. At certain venues, the role of Alice was played by Rachael Wooding.

In July 2017 the 24 remaining performances were cancelled. The week run in Swansea was cancelled first due to “continuing technical issues”, but the plan was to continue in Wolverhampton, Richmond and Bournemouth. On 28 July 2017 a statement from production company Wonderland the Musical Ltd said: "With immediate effect and a heavy heart, the remaining 24 performances of Wonderland in Wolverhampton, Richmond and Bournemouth have been cancelled. "The decision to cancel the final three weeks of the tour has been a difficult one and one that has not been taken lightly. However, following a dispute with one of the show's ex suppliers, the producers of the show have had to consider the consequential effects for the remaining tour dates."

=== Tuacahn (2022) ===
The musical opened in May 2022 at Tuacahn Center for the Arts featuring a new book by Gabriel Barre and Jennifer Paulson-Lee. This version of the show was announced to be available for licensing on November 20, 2025.

=== Youth Premiere (2022) ===
The musical received its Youth Premiere by Young Artists of America at the Music Center at Strathmore in North Bethesda, MD in December 2022, featuring over 160 performers with new symphonic orchestrations by Kim Scharnberg.

== Plot ==
The story, in the Broadway production, was as follows:

Act 1

Author Alice Stetson and her daughter have just moved to Queens, New York so that Alice can have some space from her husband, Jack ("Home") . Her young daughter, Chloe, laments about the move and her family's demise, as Alice notes that her life isn't going in the direction she had hoped. Edwina, Jack's mother, is cooking dinner for Chloe. Alice, who has just hit her head on the light of the building's service elevator, receives her children's book manuscript back from the publishers, who have coldly rejected it, saying it is too dark for children. She sadly makes a comment that Alice in Wonderland, the book Edwina had been reading to Chloe, was dark. As she lies down, she is awoken by a white rabbit who she follows down to Wonderland ("Down the Rabbit Hole").

In Wonderland, she encounters strange people and creatures who are dressed in the same dresses that the original Alice in Wonderland is known to wear ("Welcome to Wonderland"). She tries to discover why she has been brought there, and finds a mysterious drink ("Drink Me"). She then encounters the Caterpillar, whose advice is to follow in the footsteps of El Gato (the Cheshire Cat) to find out who she is ("Advice from a Caterpillar" and "Go With the Flow"). El Gato believes himself to be invisible, but he has lost the power; Alice learns from the Caterpillar that the characters in Wonderland "don't have the heart to tell him". El Gato leads her to the White Rabbit, when White Knight makes a grand entrance. He and his cohorts promises to save her at all means ("One Knight") and invites her to the Tea Party ("The Mad Tea Party").

At the party, the Mad Hatter announces with flair that she intends to rule things in Wonderland ("The Mad Hatter"). She reads Alice's tea leaves, commenting on Alice's bad qualities as the Queen arrives. The Queen announces that she is the ruler and all must obey her, or it will be off with your head ("All Hail the Queen"). Alice promises to take the Queen a brand new kingdom – the kingdom of Queens (a reference to her home in New York). The Hatter, angry, goes with Morris the March Hare to find her revenge on Alice who is a threat to the Hatter's plans. The Rabbit, El Gato, Caterpillar and Jack the White Knight all agree to help Alice find the service elevator that brought her there. Alice just wants to go home, as she and Chloe, in their new apartment, yearn for the way things used to be ("Home Reprise").

The Mad Hatter, who uses the name "Maddie", and the March Hare ascend the rabbit hole to Chloe's bedroom. They convince Chloe to come with them to help with Alice and Jack's marriage treatment to bring the family closer together ("A Nice Little Walk"). Chloe goes with them to Wonderland. However, the Hatter takes Chloe to the Land of the Looking-Glass as a prisoner, the Hatter's side of the kingdom, given to her by the Queen of Hearts, where she captures and turns her prisoners' "brains to tapioca". Jack agrees to help Alice in exchange for a kiss, as the White Rabbit makes mention of this news. Together, Alice, Jack, Rabbit, El Gato and the Caterpillar agree to break through the Looking-Glass to save Chloe ("Through the Looking Glass").

Act 2

Inside the Hatter's war room, she locks Chloe in the tallest dungeon. She also captures the Caterpillar, El Gato and the White Knight as they fight to free Alice (and the Rabbit). The Hatter declares she will win her battle ("I Will Prevail"). Alice finds herself in front of a door with the comedy and tragedy masks. She notices above the door the word "THEATRICAL" (which changes spell HATTER and ALICE, with the letter "E" rotating between the two names) though she misses the clue the first time, this is when the Rabbit tells Alice that he can turn back time by just "winding back his watch". Alice tells the Rabbit to get captured and use the watch to save everyone. After the Rabbit leaves, Alice enters and encounters Lewis Carroll (the Victorian Gentleman). He encourages her to write something that is important to her, something she dreamt of ("I Am My Own Invention").

The Hatter delivers the list of executions to the Queen of Hearts, 7 beheadings, with the names of 6 of the characters and a "wildcard" slot (meant for the Queen). The Hatter eggs her on that she is the only one who can say "Off with their heads" with such flair, and convinces the Queen to allow the beheadings to take place in the land of the Looking-Glass. The Queen delights in the truth of her signature phrase ("Off With Their Heads"). Lewis Carroll leads Alice to a hall of mirrors, where she believes she has found Chloe. However, she realizes she is talking to a young Alice. She finally learns why she was brought to Wonderland: to remember and love who she is and was ("Once More I Can See").

Back at the prison, the Rabbit is captured. When Morris the March Hare asks for any valuables he wants them to keep safe, he hands over the watch. When Jack asks why he was captured, he explains about the watch to save them, but the prisoners are dismayed at the news. Jack tells the Rabbit to find dismiss his fears, that they will get the watch back, but they must attack the very men they are trying to save. They defeat the prison guards, who are Jack's Boy-Band Knights that were transformed after the Hatter brought them under her control, and return them to their normal mindset when they get the watch back. They free the rest of the guards from the Hatter's command, leaving her defenseless. The boy-band, Jack, Caterpillar, Rabbit and El Gato save Alice from the dungeon and learn that together, anything is possible ("Together"). Morris hands over the beheading list to Jack, where they learn of the Hatter's plans to overthrow everyone, including the Queen. When the Hatter arrives to taunt Alice with a final riddle, Alice learns that the Hatter is the alter-ego of herself. Alice did not come to Wonderland when she was supposed, due to her mother's death and her childhood coming to an end, over two decades prior. Due to this, the Hatter was created out of every bad moment Alice has ever faced in her life. The Queen, learning of the Hatter's plan to behead her, banishes the Hatter to the underground world. Alice, who tries to defend the Hatter, is held at knife-point until Jack saves her. However, he is brought down to the underworld as well. Alice is happy that she may leave with Chloe, but the two lament Jack's death as they go home ("Heroes").

Alice awakens from her dream when her husband, Jack, arrives with Chloe's forgotten doll and claiming it is his White Knight syndrome that drove him there and his desire to protect his family since they're under a new roof. Alice embraces him and realizes what she has in front of her eyes, the family is together once again. As they all head down for dinner, she remains behind for a moment to write down what she has learned from her adventures in Wonderland, but especially what she learned from the rabbit, that time is fleeting, and from her dream: "ordinary magic happens every single day", and it is all around us in the simplest ways ("Finding Wonderland").

== Characters ==
The main characters are listed, described, and who played them in the original Broadway show

Alice - The main protagonist of the story who had recently split up with her husband Jack and moved away with her daughter Chloe. Alice is not only stubborn, but is adamant not to believe the world of Wonderland around her and the love she feels toward Jack/White Knight despite their differences. Played by Janet Dacal.

White Knight - Alice's 'hero' or so he wants to be. White Knight, in Alice's mind, is based on her ex-husband Jack and is determined to help Alice get back home for the price of a kiss. He is both brave and sentimental and even after being captured still drives Alice to save her daughter and get back home. Played by Darrin Ritchie.

Mad Hatter - The Mad Hatter is the main antagonist in this story and is using the queen to rise to power in Wonderland. She is the definition of back stabbing and isn't precisely 'all there' - after all, she is the 'Mad' Hatter. It is later shown that The Mad Hatter is the embodiment of Alice's past and current faults in her personality because of it. Despite being directly related to the "good" version of herself, she's always one step ahead of everyone else in her selfish plans, and isn't afraid to show it. Played by Katherine Shindle.

Caterpillar - A mysterious creature that always speaks in riddles. Though he may think he's helping he doesn't explain his meanings of the riddles that he speaks. Even through the twisting of words he helps Alice along the way on her adventure. Played by E. Clayton Cornelious.

El Gato - An enthusiastic creature that Alice runs into in Wonderland. He's a take on the Cheshire cat and shares the same characteristics, except of course floating and disappearing; though he doesn't quite know that. His name in English translates to "The Cat". Played by Jose Llana.

White Rabbit - The white rabbit is the one that took Alice into Wonderland in the first place and is willing enough to help Alice get back home. He is skittish and yet brave enough to save his friends when they needed it most. Played by Edward Staudenmayer.

Chloe - Chloe is Alice's daughter who wants nothing more than a functional family and will risk anything to get it. She's depressed to be living without her dad and shuts herself away from her mom in the beginning. Is the damsel in distress. Played by Carly Rose Sonenclar.

Queen of Hearts - The Queen of Hearts isn't exactly cruel, as much as she is a pawn. She acts in control of the world Wonderland, but doesn't know that she is just being used. However, she is a very proud, robust woman who isn't afraid of spouting her accusations. Played by Karen Mason.

Morris - Morris is the Mad Hatter's henchman and is, like the queen, being played. The Mad Hatter uses him for her dirty deeds but he follows her orders pretty willingly. He is just about the exact opposite of the White Rabbit. Played by Danny Stiles.

== Characters and original cast ==
Character	Reading (2009)	Tampa (2009)	Houston (2010)	Tampa (2011)	Broadway (2011)	U.K. National Tour (2017)	Tuacahn (2022)
Alice Stetson	Lauren Kennedy	Janet Dacal	Janet Dacal	Janet Dacal	Janet Dacal	Kerry Ellis/Rachael Wooding	Crystal Kellogg
Jack / White Knight / The Victorian Gentleman	Ryan Silverman	Darren Ritchie	Darren Ritchie	Darren Ritchie	Darren Ritchie	Stephen Webb	Josh Strickland
Mad Hatter	Nikki Snelson	Nikki Snelson	Nikki Snelson	Kate Shindle	Kate Shindle	Natalie McQueen	Katie Lamark
Caterpillar	—N/a	Eugene Fleming	Tommar Wilson	E. Clayton Cornelious	E. Clayton Cornelious	Kayi Ushe	Rendell Debose
El Gato	Sean Palmer	Jose Llana	Jose Llana	Jose Llana	Jose Llana	Dominic Owen	Michael Carrasco
The White Rabbit	Sean McCourt	Edward Staudenmayer	Edward Staudenmayer	Edward Staudenmayer	Edward Staudenmayer	Dave Willetts	Bryan Dobson
Chloe	Julie Brooks	Julie Brooks	Julie Brooks	Carly Rose Sonenclar	Carly Rose Sonenclar	Naomi Morris	Harper Griffith
Queen of Hearts / Edwina	Julia Murney	Karen Mason	Karen Mason	Karen Mason	Karen Mason	Wendi Peters	Lexie Dorsett Sharp
Morris the March Hare	—N/a	—N/a	—N/a	Danny Stiles	Danny Stiles	Ben Kerr	Randal Keith
Jabberwock	John Treacy Egan	Tad Wilson	Tad Wilson	—N/a	—N/a	—N/a	—N/a
Chaz	—N/a	—N/a	—N/a	—N/a	—N/a	—N/a	James Taylor Odom/Aaron Dejesus

For the 2017 UK Tour, El Gato was renamed as The Cheshire Cat, and Chloe was renamed as Ellie.

== Musical numbers ==
The musical numbers from the 2011 Broadway production are as follows:

Act I

- Overture † - Orchestra
- The Worst Day Of My Life †† – Chloe and Alice
- Down the Rabbit Hole † – Alice and Unearthly Voices
- Welcome to Wonderland – Alice, Company
- Drink Me – Unearthly Voices
- Advice From a Caterpillar – Caterpillar, Alice and Legs
- Go With the Flow – El Gato, Alice, Cats and Kittens
- One Knight – Jack the White Knight and Fellow Knights
- Mad Tea Party – Company
- The Mad Hatter – The Mad Hatter and Company
- Hail the Queen † – The Queen of Hearts and Company
- Home (as “Home” (Reprise) in the Broadway cast recording) – Alice and Chloe
- A Nice Little Walk † – The Mad Hatter, Chloe and Morris
- Through the Looking Glass † – Alice, Jack, Caterpillar, El Gato and The White Rabbit

Act II

- Entr'Acte †† - Orchestra
- I Will Prevail † – The Mad Hatter, Looking Glass Guard
- I Am My Own Invention † – The Victorian Gentleman and Alice
- Off with Their Heads – The Queen of Hearts and Ladies-in-Waiting
- Once More I Can See – Alice
- Together † – Jack, Caterpillar, El Gato, and White Rabbit
- Home (reprise) † (as “Heroes” in the Broadway cast recording) - Alice, Chloe, El Gato, Caterpillar, and White Rabbit
- Finding Wonderland – Alice and Company

† - Lyric or music changes, different from the Broadway cast recording. †† - Does not appear on the Broadway cast recording.

The numbers "Cat Shoe Shuffle", "Love Begins" and "This Is Who I Am" were added for the 2017 UK Tour.

== Critical reception ==
Tampa and Houston reviews

John Fleming of the St. Petersburg Times expressed mixed feelings about the production. He called it "a visual feast, with dazzling costumes, marvelously funky dance and a flashy, high-tech production design," thought it "is loaded with talent onstage," and said the score "boasts one insanely catchy pop song after another." He continued, "But Wonderland also has a problem: It makes almost no sense. The book needs a major rewrite, and not just a tweak here and there. What Wildhorn and his colleagues...or somebody else can do to bring at least a measure of dramatic logic to the musical will ultimately decide its fate." He felt a scene in which Alice meets author Lewis Carroll "appears to be an attempt to give the show emotional depth", but "it is totally out of place, like dropping a scene from one of Wildhorn's Gothic pop operas into Legally Blonde," and the character of the Mad Hatter was a "casualty of the misconceived book" because "the story is so preposterous." He noted "El Gato and the jazzy Caterpillar ... have great solos to introduce Alice to Wonderland, but then have little to do the rest of the show."

Walt Belcher of the Tampa Tribune called it "a fun ride" but observed, "At this stage in the play's ongoing development, the parts seem greater than the whole as there are characters and songs along the way that excite and delight but there may be one or two more ballads than necessary." He thought Janet Dacal, as Alice, "so appealing in the role that we'd follow her anywhere. With a strong voice, great dance moves and flair for comedy, Dacal is a perfect fit for the role." Variety wrote that the musical "offers pleasures from an engaging cast, top Broadway designers and a catchy score that returns Wildhorn to his pop music roots" but felt "the story is confusing almost from the start, especially in the messier second act, when it drifts around and then rushes to an unemotional conclusion....[T]here's not yet a delightful or tear-filled resolution".

The review of the Houston run in The Houston Chronicle stated: "The show boasts the appeal of Boyd's splashy staging, a talented cast led by vivacious star-in-the-making Janet Dacal and some striking design elements, including spectacular use of projections...Wildhorn delivers his trademark, conventional pop sound, boosted by some lively rhythms and catchy hooks here and there....Dacal is a find as Alice. Her singing is strong and sure, she moves well and projects spunky presence. ... The show's visuals are its strong suit. Neil Patel's sets are ingenious if somewhat slapdash in stylistic consistency....As a work in progress, Wonderland no doubt will continue improving. Even as it stands, for all the shortcomings, it's likely to please many who'll be happy enough with its bursts of flash, volume and grab-bag of references to those beloved Alice books."

Broadway

The show received negative reviews. However, The New York Times reviewer Charles Isherwood wrote that the musical is "peppily inspirational" and the "book displays flashes of fresh humor ... with a convoluted story line." The Wildhorn songs are a "competent rendering of various pop styles".

The show was one of the few new musicals to fail to receive a nomination for any major theatre awards.

== Recordings ==
- Linda Eder recorded the first song released from the show, titled "Anything Can Happen," for her CD It's No Secret Anymore. It no longer is included in the production.
- In November 2009 an original cast album featuring the cast of the Tampa production was released. John Fleming of the St. Petersburg Times, called it "a terrific pop album, overflowing with insanely catchy hooks, toe-tapping rock and swelling choruses that you couldn’t get out of your head if you wanted to. Of the 15 songs from the show, at least half of them sound like hit singles, and they don’t need any theatrical context." He added, "Of course, pop music can be manipulative, shamelessly derivative and loaded with cheap effects, like splashy key changes at every turn. Wildhorn is gleefully guilty on all counts here...Wonderland is full of songs that are perfect for listening to on an iPod or a car CD player."
- European Theatre star Thomas Borchert released the song "Together" on his 2010 CD If I Sing.
- Linda Eder recorded the song "The Mad Hatter Attacks" for her 2010 album Now, her first collaboration with Frank Wildhorn and Jeremy Roberts in years.
- An Original Broadway Cast Recording by the Masterworks Broadway label was released on May 3, 2011.
- A cast recording starring the Japanese Premiere Cast was released in March 2013.
- A Live Cast Recording of the Landestheater Linz production was released on May 16, 2025.

== Awards ==
- 2011 Astaire Award for Broadway Choreographer (Marguerite Derricks) (Nominated)
