= The Great Gatsby (musical) =

2023 stage musical

- A New Musical
- Broadway Promotional Poster
- Music: Jason Howland
- Lyrics: Nathan Tysen
- Book: Kait Kerrigan
- Basis: The Great Gatsby by F. Scott Fitzgerald
- Premiere: October 12, 2023: Paper Mill Playhouse
- Productions: 2023 Paper Mill Playhouse; 2024 Broadway; 2025 London; 2025 Seoul; 2026 North American Tour

The Great Gatsby is a musical with music and lyrics by Jason Howland and Nathan Tysen, and a book by Kait Kerrigan. It is based on the 1925 novel of the same name by F. Scott Fitzgerald.

The show started its Broadway previews on March 29, 2024, at the Broadway Theatre and officially opened on April 25, 2024.

The show made its European debut at the London Coliseum for a limited run from April 11, 2025 until September 7, 2025.

== Synopsis ==
=== Act I ===
In 1922, Nick Carraway, a young, Midwestern World War I veteran, arrives in New York to work as a bond salesman. He is lucky to find a cheap rental in a cottage adjoining, and owned by, his mysterious neighbor, Jay Gatsby. Nick is awestruck at the wealth and excess on display, particularly Gatsby's palatial estate ("Roaring On"). Nick travels directly across the bay to the home of his cousin Daisy and her husband, his old-money Yale college acquaintance Tom Buchanan, a former football star. Daisy introduces Nick to her friend, golfer Jordan Baker, a vivacious and independent young woman. Daisy is pleased to see Nick flourish in New York and implies that her marriage is unhappy ("Absolute Rose"). Daisy and Jordan learn that Nick has received an invitation to one of Gatsby's famous over-the-top parties; Daisy becomes pensive at the mention of Gatsby's name, but Jordan is eager to experience the lavish party and asks Nick to take her ("New Money"). During the party, Gatsby sends for Nick; they meet privately in the study, where Gatsby shows Nick his war medals for valor. Gatsby confesses that he has built his fortune and estate solely to win back his pre-war sweetheart, Daisy, whose father had rejected him as a suitor for Daisy before the war because of his poor social position. He asks for Nick's help in reacquainting them ("For Her"); Nick is hesitant, finding the overture distasteful, since his cousin is married.

George Wilson, at his run-down garage and gas station in the shadow of a gigantic billboard, questions his position in life ("Valley of Ashes"). George receives regular shipments from Gatsby's shady business associate, Meyer Wolfsheim. Tom visits the garage to get gas, and all realize, except George, that his wife Myrtle is Tom's mistress; Myrtle hates being poor and is excited to be the mistress of a rich man ("Second-Hand Suit"). Meanwhile, Daisy and Jordan discuss Tom's indiscretions and the state of her marriage; Jordan is staunchly against getting married ("For Better or Worse").

Tom takes Myrtle and Nick (who thought they were going for a day at the Met) to the Manhattan apartment of Myrtle's sister Catherine, and they carry on their affair. Tom breaks Myrtle's nose during an argument; Nick despises Tom's brutality and snobbery and decides to reintroduce Daisy and Gatsby ("The Met"). As Gatsby had suggested, Nick invites Daisy to an afternoon tea. Gatsby is to casually drop by, but he panics and provides Nick's cottage with lavish decorations and expensive food ("Only Tea"). Daisy is pleased to see Gatsby, and the two converse privately inside the cottage while Nick and Jordan flirt outside during a rainshower and share a kiss ("Only Tea (reprise)"). Daisy goes with Gatsby back to his mansion, finds out that her father had destroyed Gatsby's wartime letters to her, and the two begin an affair ("My Green Light").

=== Act II ===
Wolfsheim reflects about illicit acts and secrecy ("Shady"). Nick and Jordan's relationship deepens; Jordan proposes to Nick. ("Better Hold Tight"). Gatsby, convinced that Daisy will leave Tom for him, begins to plan a party recreating their relationship during the war, neglecting his business affairs with Wolfsheim ("Past Is Catching Up to Me"). At the party, Gatsby hires performer Gilda Gray and dances with Daisy as Tom watches enviously and converses with Wolfsheim ("La Dee Dah with You"). Daisy tells Gatsby that she wants to run away with him ("Go"). Tom demands that Daisy leave but is persuaded to visit the Plaza Hotel with Nick, Jordan, and Gatsby instead. Tom, driving Nick and Jordan, stops at the Wilsons' garage; Jordan loudly says they are going to the Plaza and Myrtle (who, unbeknownst to them, is pregnant) hears ("Valley of Ashes (reprise)").

At the Plaza, Daisy and Gatsby's affair comes to light, infuriating Tom. Gatsby demands that Daisy swear she never loved Tom, but Daisy cannot; she becomes more reluctant to leave Tom after Tom reveals that Gatsby's fortune is from bootlegging alcohol ("Made to Last"). Everyone leaves the hotel. Myrtle has been walking to the Plaza, thinking about her pregnancy with Tom's child. She is hit and killed by a yellow Rolls-Royce ("One-Way Road"). Tom sees Myrtle's body being carried away by the police. Jordan and Nick realize that Gatsby's car killed Myrtle, but Jordan wants to stay quiet. After witnessing the events at the Plaza, Jordan's cynicism returns and she, believing that all marriages are destined to fail, calls off her engagement with Nick ("For Better or Worse" (reprise)). Tom tells George that Gatsby owned the car; George despairs ("God Sees Everything").

Daisy retreats into her own home. Nick finds Gatsby alone at his mansion. Gatsby tells Nick that Daisy had been driving the car. He thinks Daisy will return to him and says he intends to take the fall. Nick leaves as Gatsby begins to take a swim. George arrives and shoots Gatsby and then himself ("For Her" (reprise)). Nick is the only friend at Gatsby's funeral as people gossip about his death ("New Money" (reprise)). Nick confronts Daisy, who is now leaving with Tom for Honolulu, about her abandonment of Gatsby. Daisy tells Nick that she hopes her young daughter has no further ambitions beyond becoming a beautiful and docile rich wife ("Beautiful Little Fool"). Deciding to return to the Midwest, Nick visits Gatsby's abandoned mansion one last time and thinks he sees the man briefly standing on the dock ("Finale: Roaring On").

== Production history ==
=== New Jersey (2023) ===
The show received its world premiere in Millburn, New Jersey, at the Paper Mill Playhouse. Previews began on October 12, 2023, with an official opening night on October 22. It played for a limited engagement through November 12. It starred Jeremy Jordan, Eva Noblezada, Noah J. Ricketts, Samantha Pauly, Sara Chase, John Zdrojeski, Paul Whitty, and Stanley Wayne Mathis as Jay, Daisy, Nick, Jordan, Myrtle, Tom, George, and Wolfsheim respectively. It was directed by Marc Bruni and choreographed by Dominique Kelly.

=== Broadway (2024–present) ===
The Paper Mill production transferred to the Broadway Theatre, with previews from March 29, 2024, and officially opened on April 25, 2024. Jordan, Noblezada, Ricketts, Chase, Pauly, Zdrojeski, and Whitty reprised their roles. Eric Anderson joined the cast as Wolfsheim. The production is directed by Bruni with set & projection design by Paul Tate dePoo III. Chilina Kennedy temporarily replaced Chase as Myrtle from July to September 2024. Charlie Pollock took over the role of George Wilson in November 2024. In January 2025, Ryan McCartan replaced Jordan in the production and Terrence Mann replaced Anderson temporarily (through April 20, 2025). Sarah Hyland replaced Noblezada in February of that same year. At the end of March, Linedy Genao replaced Chase and Austin Colby took over the role of Tom Buchanan. Michael Maliakel also joined the cast replacing Ricketts as Nick Carraway. In June, Aisha Jackson replaced Hyland. In March 2026, Reeve Carney joined the cast as Gatsby alongside his real-life wife Noblezada returning as Daisy, Corbin Bleu as Nick and John Behlmann as Tom. Derek Klena is set to star as Gatsby beginning in December 2026.

=== London (2025) ===
The production made its European premiere in London on 24 April 2025 at the London Coliseum, having started previews on 11 April, and played a limited run through 7 September 2025. In February 2025, it was announced Jamie Muscato and Frances Mayli McCann would star as Jay and Daisy, respectively. The remaining cast includes Corbin Bleu as Nick, John Owen-Jones as Wolfsheim, Rachel Tucker as Myrtle, Jon Robyns as Tom, Amber Davies as Jordan, and Joel Montague as George.

=== South Korea (2025) ===
The musical held its Asian premiere at the GS Arts Center in the Gangnam District of Seoul, having played from August 1 to November 9 with Matt Doyle as Gatsby.

=== North American tour (2026) ===
In January 2025, the Broadway production announced a North American tour was set to launch with performances set to begin in Baltimore, Maryland from January 31 to February 7, 2026. In December 2025, Jake David Smith was cast as Jay Gatsby for the tour, with Senzel Ahmady reprising her role as Daisy Buchanan from the South Korean production. Also reprising their roles from the Seoul production are Tally Sessions and Edward Staudenmayer as George Wilson and Meyer Wolfsheim respectively. Sessions and Staudenmayer's casting were announced with the rest of the main cast in January 2026, just ahead of the tour. Broadway cast alumnus Austin Colby took over the role of Gatsby on tour in October 2026

=== Poland (2027) ===
In July 2026, Warsaw's Roma Musical Theatre announced that The Great Gatsby would become its next large-scale production. It will be the first production of the musical in Poland and its first non-English-language staging. The production will be presented in Polish under an official license from the Broadway producers and will be a non-replica production. According to the theatre, the original Broadway creative team, including director Marc Bruni and choreographer Dominique Kelley, will supervise the adaptation of the production for the Roma Theatre.

== Cast and characters ==
Character	Millburn	Broadway	London	South Korea	US Tour
Character	2023	2024	2025		2026
Jay Gatsby	Jeremy Jordan	Jeremy Jordan	Jamie Muscato	Matt Doyle	Jake David Smith
Daisy Buchanan	Eva Noblezada	Eva Noblezada	Frances Mayli McCann	Senzel Ahmady	Senzel Ahmady
Nick Carraway	Noah J. Ricketts	Noah J. Ricketts	Corbin Bleu	Gerald Caesar	Joshua Grosso
Jordan Baker	Samantha Pauly	Samantha Pauly	Amber Davies	Amber Ardolino	Leanne Robinson
Tom Buchanan	John Zdrojeski	John Zdrojeski	Jon Robyns	Wes Williams	Will Branner
Myrtle Wilson	Sara Chase	Sara Chase	Rachel Tucker	Jeanna de Waal	Lila Coogan
George Wilson	Paul Whitty	Paul Whitty	Joel Montague	Tally Sessions	Tally Sessions
Meyer Wolfsheim	Stanley Wayne Mathis	Eric Anderson	John Owen-Jones	Edward Staudenmayer	Edward Staudenmayer

=== Notable replacements ===
==== Broadway (2024-present) ====
- Jay Gatsby: Ryan McCartan, Reeve Carney, Derek Klena
- Daisy Buchanan: Sarah Hyland, Aisha Jackson, China Anne McClain
- Nick Carraway: Corbin Bleu
- Jordan Baker: Naturi Naughton
- Tom Buchanan: Austin Colby, John Behlmann
- Myrtle Wilson: Chilina Kennedy, Linedy Genao
- Meyer Wolfsheim: Terrence Mann

==== Tour (2026-present) ====
- Jay Gatsby: Austin Colby

== Musical numbers ==
Act I

- "Roaring On" – Nick and Company
- "Absolute Rose" – Daisy, Jordan, Tom, and Nick
- "New Money" – Jordan, Nick, Wolfsheim and Company
- "For Her" – Gatsby
- "Valley of Ashes" – Wilson
- "Second-Hand Suit" – Myrtle, Tom, and Company
- "For Better or Worse" – Daisy
- "The Met" – Nick
- "Only Tea" – Gatsby, Nick and Company
- "Only Tea (Reprise)" – Nick and Jordan
- "My Green Light" – Gatsby and Daisy

Act II

- "Shady" – Wolfsheim and Company
- "Better Hold Tight" – Nick and Jordan
- "Past Is Catching Up to Me" – Gatsby
- "La Dee Dah With You" – Gilda Gray and Company
- "Go" – Daisy and Gatsby
- "Made to Last" – Tom, Gatsby, Daisy, Jordan, and Nick
- "Valley of Ashes (Reprise)" – Wilson
- "For Better or Worse (Reprise)" – Jordan
- "One-Way Road" – Myrtle
- "God Sees Everything" – Wilson
- "For Her (Reprise)" – Gatsby, Nick, and Wilson
- "New Money (Reprise)" – Company
- "Beautiful Little Fool" – Daisy
- "Finale: Roaring On" – Nick and Company

The original Broadway cast recording for the musical was released digitally on 28 June 2024 through Masterworks Broadway. CDs of the recording were released later on 2 August 2024.

== Reception ==
The Guardian described the original Broadway performance as an 'underwhelming transfer to stage in a bombastic yet misfiring new production' criticizing the play's comedic direction stating it 'thins by the musical's second act' and the focus on the 'love story' instead of the 'rigorous analysis of class or the American dream' prevalent in the source material.

The New York Times stated that 'This musical adaptation, now on Broadway, is a lot of Jazz Age fun. But it forgot that Fitzgerald’s 1925 novel endures because it is a tragedy.' Criticizing the 'underwhelming' nature and inability to take characters such as Myrtle 'seriously', they praised the sets and technical effects.

Entertainment Weekly summarized the Broadway adaption as 'A glitzy take on F. Scott Fitzgerald's novel that values spectacle over substance', stating the 'tone swings wildly back and forth'. However they also praised the cast's multidimensional performances and Cho's period costumes.

The Washington Post criticized the show's lack of 'subtlety' and shedding of important themes to become 'a rom-com that nose-dives into overwrought melodrama', describing the play's second act as a 'a rapid succession of false ends' where the play is 'blinded' by capitalism. However, they praised Ricketts' performance as Nick Carraway and the set and costumes.

Variety Magazine praised the set, costumes, and visuals, but stated the show traded 'the novel’s soul for flashy visuals' and criticized plot changes such as making Nick and Jordan explicitly heterosexual, rushing plot points, removing Daisy's 'morally bankrupt and selfish' aspects, and that 'most egregiously the musical completely omits Gatsby's backstory'.

== Awards and nominations ==
=== Original Broadway production ===
Year	Award	Category	Nominee	Result
2024	Tony Awards	Best Costume Design in a Musical	Linda Cho	Won
2024	Drama League Awards	Distinguished Performance	Eva Noblezada	Nominated
2024	Outer Critics Circle Awards	Outstanding New Broadway Musical		Nominated
2024	Outer Critics Circle Awards	Outstanding Scenic Design	Paul Tate dePoo III	Won
2024	Outer Critics Circle Awards	Outstanding Projection Design	Paul Tate dePoo III	Nominated
2024	Outer Critics Circle Awards	Outstanding Costume Design	Linda Cho	Won

=== West End production (2025) ===
Year	Award	Category	Nominee	Result
2026	WhatsOnStage Awards (Note: Unlike most theatre honours in the UK, WhatsOnStage Awards are decided by the public vote.)	Best Performer in a Musical	Jamie Muscato	Nominated
2026	WhatsOnStage Awards	Best Supporting Performer in a Musical	Amber Davies	Won
2026	WhatsOnStage Awards	Best New Musical	Kait Kerrigan, Jason Howland and Nathan Tysen	Nominated
2026	WhatsOnStage Awards	Best Set Design	Paul Tate dePoo III	Nominated
2026	WhatsOnStage Awards	Best Costume Design	Linda Cho	Nominated
2026	WhatsOnStage Awards	Best Wigs, Hair and Make-up Design	Charles G LaPointe, Rachael Geier (Wigs and Hair) and Ashley Ryan (Make-up)	Nominated
2026	Laurence Olivier Awards	Best Actor in a Supporting Role in a Musical	Corbin Bleu	Nominated
2026	Laurence Olivier Awards	Best Costume Design	Linda Cho	Nominated
2026	Laurence Olivier Awards	Best Set Design	Paul Tate dePoo III	Nominated
