= Autumn Casey =

American visual artist (born 1987)

- Born: 1987 (age 38–39); West Palm Beach, Florida
- Education: BFA New World School of the Arts, Miami; MFA Pennsylvania Academy of Fine Arts, Philadelphia
- Known for: Sculpture, Installation, Video art, Performance art
- Website: autumncasey.com

Autumn Casey (born 1987) is a Miami-based multimedia artist working in sculpture and installations, mixing found and collected objects with fabric, wire, and resin, among other materials, to create a psychedelic-like look and feel in her artistic practice.

== Early life and education ==
Casey was born in West Palm Beach, Florida, in 1987. Casey's grandmother was a June Taylor dancer, an antique dealer, and a doll-maker. Her scraps and memorabilia are often seen or referenced in Casey's work.

Casey received a BA from New World School of the Arts, Miami, and an MFA from the Pennsylvania Academy of Fine Arts, Philadelphia.

== Work ==
Casey's screaming performance during Art Basel Miami Beach 2012 was covered by the Huffington Post. Casey's 2014 solo show Autumn Casey: Amalgama displayed installations, sculptures, and video, and gathered family heirlooms and found objects to comment on human relations, memories, and time.

In 2016, Casey's solo exhibition Balancing Infinity, While Hanging Upside Down. Watching Lovers Fall from Grace, Underneath the Ground was inspired by the 1910 Rider-Waite-Smith Tarot Deck, from A.E. Waite and Pamela Coleman Smith. In 2019, the Miami Herald profiled Casey.

She was a Summer Open resident at Bakehouse Art Complex, Miami, in 2021. She was granted a Home + Away Residence at Anderson Ranch Arts Center from Oolites Arts, Miami, in 2022.

In 2024, Casey expanded on her interest in Louis Comfort Tiffany's signature lamps and stained glass compositions, which the artist saw for the first time during a visit to the Queens Museum, New York, years back, to create the series Fantasy and Her Fantasies. The solo exhibition Fantasy and Her Fantasies, drew attention to the all-women design team at Women's Glass Cutting Department of Louis Comfort Tiffany's workshop, and it was on view in The Future Perfect gallery, East Village, New York, showcasing Casey's "illuminated sculptures" in spring of 2024.

In an interview with Surface magazine, Casey listed a few of her artistic references, including Niki de Saint Phalle, Ree Morton, Mierle Laderman Ukeles, Agnes Denes, and Cecilia Vicuña.

in 2026, Autumn Casey's name was included in Architecture Digest's list of "Meet 8 Artists Leading America's Craft Revival." Her video work Elysian Fields, created in 2014, was featured in the Pérez Art Museum Miami's exhibition Fragments of Time: Selections from PAMM's Collection, on view at PAMM.tv.

== Collections ==
Casey's work is featured in the collections of the Pérez Art Museum Miami and the Museum of Contemporary Art, North Miami (MOCA).
