= John Zdrojeski =

American actor

John Zdrojeski is an American actor best known for his Broadway career.

== Early life and education ==
Zdrojeski is originally from Wethersfield, Connecticut. He graduated from Boston University in 2012 and earned an MFA from New York University in 2018.

== Career ==
In 2023, Zdrojeski made his Broadway debut, playing George Gershwin in Good Night, Oscar.

In July 2024, Zdrojeski released his first EP.

In 2024, Zdrojeski originated the role of Tom Buchanan in The Great Gatsby on Broadway. Zdrojeski left the production in March 2025.

In March of 2026, Zdrojeski took over the role of Dr. Brenner in Stranger Things: The First Shadow.In the fall of 2026, he performed in the Lincoln Center revival of A Few Good Men as 1st. Lt. Jonathan Kendrick.

== Personal life ==
In 2026, he married actress Sara Chase.
