= Linedy Genao =

American actress (born 1991)

- Born: May 27, 1991 (age 35); Brooklyn, New York
- Education: University of Connecticut
- Occupations: Actress; singer
- Years active: 2015–present
- Known for: Bad Cinderella

Linedy Genao (born May 27, 1991) is an American actress. She is known for playing the role of Cinderella in Andrew Lloyd Webber's Bad Cinderella on Broadway.

== Early life and education ==
Genao was born on May 27 in Brooklyn, New York, to a Dominican family. At age ten, she moved with her family to Hamden, Connecticut, where she performed in plays in middle school and Hamden High School. After applying to both theatre and business schools, Genao studied business at the University of Connecticut and worked in banking while continuing to do community theater.

== Career ==
Genao's Broadway debut was in 2015, as an original Broadway cast member of On Your Feet!, a musical about Gloria and Emilio Estefan. She got the part at an open casting call. When theatres had to close during the COVID-19 pandemic, she returned to her previous profession, doing remote banking work. She has stated that she considered returning to banking full-time at the time but decided against it when she was offered to join the cast of Dear Evan Hansen as an understudy when it re-opened on Broadway. She had previously been a vacation swing on the first national tour of the show, prior to the pandemic. In late 2022, she starred as Gloria in a production of On Your Feet! at the Paper Mill Playhouse in New Jersey.

Genao played the role of Cinderella in the Broadway production of Bad Cinderella at the Imperial Theatre, opening officially on March 23, 2023. She was the first Latina woman to originate a leading role in a Lloyd Webber production on Broadway. The show closed on June 4, 2023.

In 2025, she was cast as the role of Myrtle Wilson in the Broadway production of The Great Gatsby.

== Theatre credits ==
Ref:

Year	Production	Role	Theatre
2015	On Your Feet!	Ensemble	Nederlander Theatre
2015–2017	On Your Feet!	Rachel / Ensemble u/s Gloria	Marquis Theatre, Broadway
2017	In the Heights	Vanessa	Olney Theatre Center
2018	West Side Story	Rosalia	Barrington Stage Company
2019	West Side Story	Rosalia	Lyric Opera of Chicago
2019–2020	Dear Evan Hansen	u/s Zoe Murphy u/s Alana Beck	US National Tour
2021–2022	Dear Evan Hansen	u/s Zoe Murphy u/s Alana Beck	Music Box Theatre, Broadway
2022	On Your Feet!	Gloria Estefan	Paper Mill Playhouse
2023	Bad Cinderella	Cinderella	Imperial Theatre, Broadway
2025–2026	The Great Gatsby	Myrtle Wilson	Broadway Theatre, Broadway

== Discography ==
=== Singles ===
Year	Title
2022	"Bad Cinderella"
2023	"I Know I Have a Heart (Because You Broke It)"
2026	"Alone: The Concept Album"
