= The Star of the Backstage =

- The Simpsons episode
- One of the promotional posters released for the episode, parodying Chicago
- Episode no.: Season 33; Episode 1
- Directed by: Rob Oliver
- Written by: Elisabeth Kiernan Averick
- Production code: QABF17
- Original air date: September 26, 2021

Guest appearances
- Kristen Bell as Marge Simpson (singing voice); Sara Chase as Sasha Reed

Episode chronology
← Previous "The Last Barfighter"	Next → "Bart's in Jail!"
- The Simpsons season 33

"The Star of the Backstage" is the thirty-third season premiere of the American animated television series The Simpsons, and the 707th episode overall. It aired in the United States on Fox on September 26, 2021. The episode was directed by Rob Oliver and written by Elisabeth Kiernan Averick.

In this episode, Marge is reunited with her classmates to recreate their high school play and realizes that she was not the star because she worked backstage. Kristen Bell and Sara Chase guest starred. The episode received mixed reviews.

The episode was originally named "No Day but Yesterday".

== Plot ==
At the memorial of a recently deceased theater director, Marge is given her old production manual from the widow about her high school play "Y2K: The Millennium Bug". Now filled with fond memories of being the stage manager, Marge reunites her old classmates to restage the play.

At the theater, the group realizes that they are missing one of the cast members, Sasha Reed, who apparently moved to New York after graduation and was accepted into Juilliard. Sasha arrives in Springfield and sings of becoming a successful actress and having several celebrities as friends. Marge then realizes that Sasha was the real star of the show and envies her for her popularity and apparent success.

Eventually, however, Marge finds out that Sasha is an impostor, having lied to the rest of the cast about her fabulous career as an actress; she is in fact a sales representative at Sephora. After Marge exposes her lies, Sasha bursts into tears and leaves the rehearsal, which affects the restaging of the play.

Homer, in a song and dance routine, convinces Marge in front of Bart and Lisa to bring Sasha back into the play. Marge then realizes that Sasha's voice was one of the greatest elements of the play and finds her at Moe's Tavern to apologize for letting jealousy and their old rivalry get in the way. Sasha agrees to join the play again, and with the rest of the gang, they perform once more. While Bart and Lisa dislike the play, calling its abrupt ending "just lazy", the rest of the audience applauds, and Sasha invites Marge to a diner with the rest of the cast.

During the credits, there are photos of the play's cast in different activities.

== Production ==
=== Development ===
The episode was one of the first to be written during the COVID-19 lockdown. The episode was inspired by the Disney+ show Encore!, hosted by Kristen Bell, which reunites casts of high school musicals. Jack Dolgen wrote the music for the episode, and Kat Burns choreographed the dance sequences for the episode. Both worked with writer Elisabeth Kiernan Averick on the television series Crazy Ex-Girlfriend.

=== Casting ===
In July 2021, it was announced that Kristen Bell would be Marge's singing voice. Executive producer Matt Selman said that Bell was cast because they wanted viewers to hear the singing voice of Marge that only she can hear instead of her usual voice. Sara Chase, who went to college with Averick, was cast as one of the Springfield High School alum.

== Reception ==
=== Viewing figures ===
The episode was the highest-rated scripted program of the night (and the week), scoring a 1.2 demo rating and 3.48 million viewers. This is down from the previous season premiere, which aired with a substantially higher football lead-in, but the most-watched episode of the show since "A Springfield Summer Christmas for Christmas" in December 2020, which also had a football lead-in.

=== Critical response ===
Tony Sokol of Den of Geek gave the episode 3.5 out of 5 stars, stating "All this being said, this is a great experiment which works enough to happen again. The musical numbers have been outshining much of the scripted gags in the past few seasons of The Simpsons, and this is an encouraging outgrowth of it. But, we need more than this. It feels like a retread of something they haven’t done before, when it should feel like a whole new experience. Maybe I expect too much, or am hoping that, at 33 seasons and counting, The Simpsons will recapture the magic Marge is looking for in this episode. 1999 was the last time we partied like it was 1999."

Marcus Gibson of Bubbleblabber gave the episode a 7 out of 10 stating, "Overall, the season 33 premiere of The Simpsons sang and danced its way to amusement rather than annoyance. It's not a perfect way to start the season in terms of its humor and execution. However, as someone who enjoys watching musicals, it's entertaining enough just to hear Marge sing like Princess Anna."

Several critics have accused it of messing with the timeline of the series.

=== Awards and nominations ===
Writer Elisabeth Kiernan Averick was nominated for a Writers Guild of America Award for Television: Animation for this episode at the 74th Writers Guild of America Awards.
