= Design and Architecture High School =

Coordinates: 25°48′49.02″N 80°11′28.59″W

Design and Architecture Senior High (DASH)

Location
- 4001 Northeast 2nd Avenue; Design District, Miami, Florida 33137; United States

Information
- Type: Public magnet
- Established: 1990
- School district: Miami-Dade County Public Schools
- Principal: Maggie Rodriguez
- Teaching staff: 29.00 (FTE)
- Grades: 9–12
- Enrollment: 482 (2023-2024)
- Student to teacher ratio: 17.57
- Colors: Black, White and a DASH of Red
- Mascot: Phantoms
- Hours: 7:30 am – 2:30 pm
- Website: https://www.dashschool.net/

Design and Architecture Senior High School (DASH) is a magnet secondary school in the heart of the Design District in Miami, Florida, United States. U.S. News & World Report ranked DASH as the 15th best public high school in the nation in 2009 and 16th best in 2012. Stacey Mancuso led DASH as Principal for 17 years from 1999 to 2016. The current principal is Dr. Maggie Rodriguez, who joined the school in 2022.

DASH is a part of the Miami-Dade County Public Schools district.

== Awards ==
DASH was founded in 1990 by former principal Jacqueline Hinchey-Sipes, who coined the motto "Education by Design". Over the past 15 years DASH has earned the reputation of being one of Florida's strongest public high schools, often making Miami-Dade county's highest marks on the FCAT (Florida Comprehensive Assessment Test) exam and consistently receiving an assessment grade of A by the state. DASH has been featured in Dwell, Teen People magazine (Cool School of the Month, May 2000), and the Miami Herald. Newsweek ranked DASH as the 5th best public high school in the US for 2010. Over 95% of DASH graduates continue on to college, with most students receiving scholarships from many of the nation's top art and design programs. It was named a Blue Ribbon School of Excellence, in 1994-96, 2007 and 2016.

U.S. News & World Report 2020, DASH was ranked #3 High School in Miami-Dade County, #6 High School in Florida, #25 Magnet High School in the Nation, #72 High School in the Nation.

== Curriculum ==
The school features programs in architecture/interior design, entertainment technology, fashion design, industrial design, and visual communications/web design. The curriculum includes a strong four-year foundation in the fine arts, internships with local design firms, and dual-enrollment college-level design courses, such as performance art, taught by professors from local colleges as well as field professionals. Students take 8 courses a year (4 core classes, 2-3 art classes, and 1-2 electives) as opposed to the regular 6-course curriculum in most other Florida high schools.

== Demographics ==
DASH is 64% Hispanic, 22% White, 10% Black, and 2% Asian.

== Fashion show ==
DASH holds an annual student-run fashion show in which the junior and senior fashion students show their collections to the community. In 2004, the school was invited to include its show as part of Miami's Fashion Week of the Americas, the US's largest Latin American fashion event.

== Notable alumni ==
- Denzel Curry (born 1995), musician, rapper (was expelled/exited, then graduated from Carol City High School, class of 2013)
- Cesar Santos, artist
- Esteban Cortazar (born 1984; MH Esteban), fashion designer
- Dotie Joseph, state legislator
- Brad Kuhl, visual artist
- Monique Leyton, visual artist
- Anslem Richardson, actor, writer
- Daniel Arsham, multidisciplinary artist
- Fabiola Arias, fashion designer
- Charity Daw, songwriter, recording artist
- Mica Tenenbaum, lead singer of alternative pop duo Magdalena Bay
