= Sara Chase =

American actress

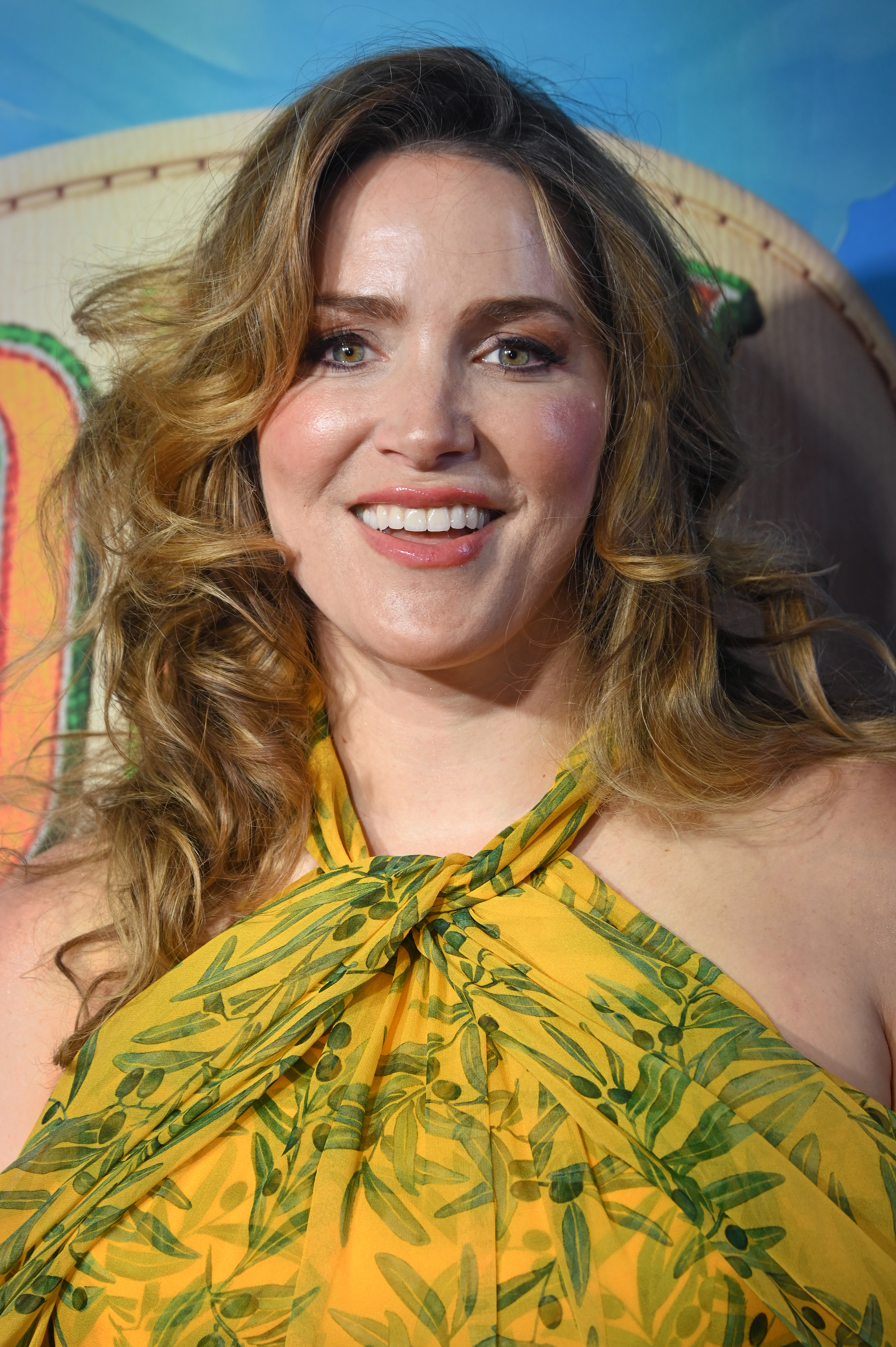
- Chase in 2026
- Born: August 3, 1982 (age 44); Hartford, Connecticut, U.S.
- Education: Boston University (BFA)
- Occupations: Actress; singer
- Spouses: Elliot Stieglitz (m. 2012; div. 2013); John Zdrojeski (m. 2026)

Sara Chase (born August 3, 1983) is an American actress and singer. She is best known for playing Cyndee Pokorny on the Netflix original series Unbreakable Kimmy Schmidt. She is also known for her Broadway roles of Myrtle in The Great Gatsby in 2023 and Melissa in Schmigadoon! in 2026, earning a Tony nomination for the latter.

== Early life and education ==
Chase was born in Hartford, Connecticut, the daughter of Arnold and Sandy Chase. She graduated from Boston University.

== Career ==
After graduation, Chase performed the two-woman sketch comedy show Jen & Angie at the Upright Citizens Brigade Theatre in New York and Los Angeles. Chase starred in the pre-Broadway production of Roman Holiday. She created the role of Principal Rosalie Mullins for Andrew Lloyd Webber and Julian Fellowes' School of Rock off-Broadway production at the Gramercy Theatre.

Chase performed in Broadway's First Date and off-Broadway in The Toxic Avenger and can be heard on their original cast albums. She also won the Best Supporting Actress award from the San Diego Theatre Critics for playing all three mistresses in First Wives Club in its pre-Broadway run.

On television, Chase appeared as a regular on Comedy Central's Michael & Michael Have Issues. Other appearances include The Office, Mercy, Arrested Development, and in the films The Other Guys, Arthur, Hello I Must Be Going, and Little Black Book. Her comedy sketches have been seen in the Women in Comedy Festival, New York Comedy Festival, and UsWeekly.com.

In 2021, Chase voiced the character of Sasha Reed in the episode "The Star of the Backstage" from season 33 of The Simpsons. On Broadway, she originated the roles of Myrtle in The Great Gatsby in 2023 and Melissa in Schmigadoon! in 2026.

== Personal life ==
Chase married Elliot Stieglitz in June 2012. In April 2013, Chase filed for divorce.

Chase remarried in September 2026 to John Zdrojeski

== Filmography ==
=== Film ===
Year	Title	Role	Notes
2004	Little Black Book	Colleen	
2008	Uncertainty	Alex	Uncredited
2009	The Winning Season	Outback Waitress	
2009	Yoo-Hoo, Mrs. Goldberg	Laura	
2010	The Other Guys	Press Conference Reporter	
2011	Arthur	Journalist #1	
2012	Hello I Must Be Going	Missy	
2012	The Normals	Nurse	
2014	Worst Friends	Sara	
2015	The Shells	Lizzy	

=== Television ===
Year	Title	Role	Notes
2007	As the World Turns	Judy Gottschalk	2 episodes
2008	Law & Order	Sarah Walsh	Episode: "Falling"
2009	Michael & Michael Have Issues	Female Sketch Player	3 episodes
2009	Mercy	Kim Kowalick	Episode: "Destiny, Meet My Daughter, Veronica"
2011	Then We Got Help!	Ashley 2	3 episodes
2012	The Office	Laura	Episode: "Roy's Wedding"
2013	Arrested Development	Receptionist	Episode: "The B. Team"
2015–2019	Unbreakable Kimmy Schmidt	Cyndee Pokorny / C.H.E.R.Y / L	28 episodes
2016	Brooklyn Sound	Janice	Episode: "Kookie and Milano"
2020	Unbreakable Kimmy Schmidt: Kimmy vs the Reverend	Cyndee Pokorny	Television film
2021	The Simpsons	Sasha Reed (voice)	Episode: "The Star of the Backstage"
2022	Blue Bloods	Tina	Episode: "Allegiance"

=== Theatre ===
Year	Title	Role	Notes
2002–2003	Bat Boy: The Musical	Shelly Parker	Boston Center for the Arts
2006	Godspell	"Bless the Lord"	Paper Mill Playhouse
2009	The Toxic Avenger	Sarah	Off-Broadway
2009	First Wives Club	Feebee LaVelle / Shelley Stewart / Leslie Rosen	Old Globe Theatre
2013	First Date	Ensemble	Broadway
2017	Roman Holiday	Francesca Cervelli	Golden Gate Theatre
2023–2025	The Great Gatsby	Myrtle Wilson	Paper Mill Playhouse & Broadway
2025–2026	Schmigadoon!	Melissa Gimble	Kennedy Center & Broadway

== Awards and nominations ==
Year	Award	Category	Work	Result	Ref.
2026	Outer Critics Circle Award	Outstanding Lead Performer in a Broadway Musical	Schmigadoon!	Nominated	
2026	Drama League Award	Distinguished Performance	Schmigadoon!	Nominated	
2026	Broadway.com Audience Choice Awards	Favorite Leading Actress in a Musical	Schmigadoon!	Nominated	
2026	Broadway.com Audience Choice Awards	Favorite Funny Performance	Schmigadoon!	Nominated	
2026	Broadway.com Audience Choice Awards	Favorite Onstage Pair (with Alex Brightman)	Schmigadoon!	Nominated	
2026	Dorian Awards	Outstanding Lead Performance in a Broadway Musical	Schmigadoon!	Nominated	
2026	Tony Award	Best Actress in a Musical	Schmigadoon!	Nominated	
