= Darren Ritchie (actor) =

American actor and singer (born 1977)

- Born: 1977 (age 47–48); South Carolina, U.S.
- Education: Carnegie Mellon University (BFA)
- Occupation(s): Actor, singer
- Notable work: Dracula, the Musical (2004); Little Shop of Horrors (2003); Bells are Ringing (2001)

Darren Ritchie (born 1977 in South Carolina) is an American actor and singer, originally from Florida.

== Career ==
Ritchie is a graduate of Booker High School in Sarasota, Florida. Ritchie has toured internationally with the UK X factor famed group "Tenors Of Rock". Ritchie is also a principal singer for the California Philharmonic Symphony as well as a singer for the US and international singing group "Broadway Rox".

He is perhaps best known for originating the role of the White Knight/Jack On Broadway in Wildhorn's Wonderland: Alice's New Musical Adventure he also originated the role of Jonathan Harker in Frank Wildhorn's Broadway production of Dracula, the Musical in 2004. He has also appeared as Orin Scrivello and other featured roles in the Broadway revival of Little Shop of Horrors, 2003, and in Bells are Ringing, 2001, (as Blake Barton). He understudied Enjolras in Les Miserables and Jimmy Smith in Thoroughly Modern Millie. He appeared in the world premiere of Wildhorn's Camille Claudel, at the Goodspeed Opera House, Norma Terris Theatre, in 2003, understudying the role of Paul Claudel.

He appeared in the regional premiere of Ace at the Old Globe Theatre, San Diego, California, in January 2007. He has also appeared in several films and television shows, most notably Stroller Wars.

In 2009, he originated the role of the White Knight/Jack in Wildhorn's Wonderland: Alice's New Musical Adventure for its Tampa, Florida world premiere production. He reprised the role for the show's Broadway run in spring 2011.

In 2017 he released his debut Album "Darren Ritchie and the ADDing Machine" available on iTunes.

In 2019, he played Rapunzel's Prince opposite Constantine Maroulis as his brother in Into the Woods at the Patchogue Theatre.
