= Teresa María Rojas =

Cuban writer

- Born: Havana, Cuba
- Education: University of Havana
- Occupations: Writer, educator, theater director, actress

Teresa María Rojas is a Cuban writer, educator, director, and actress born in Havana, Cuba.

== Biography ==
Rojas graduated from the University of Havana in 1957 and studied acting at Sala Prometeo, a small theater located in the city. After leaving Cuba in 1960, she went to Venezuela and then to Miami in 1963. Rojas began working as a professor of theater and acting at Miami Dade College (MDC, also formerly known as Miami Dade Community College) in 1972. In 1985, Rojas founded the Prometeo Theater, a bilingual theater group at MDC, serving as its artistic director. More than four hundred students worked in the Prometeo Theater each year.

During her teaching career, Rojas has performed, produced, and directed over ninety plays. In recognition of her teaching, she has been endowed with three teaching chairs. One of her former students, Nilo Cruz, wrote a Pulitzer Prize-winning play in the drama category, Anna in the Tropics. Rojas performed in the play when it returned to Miami after its Broadway debut.

== Works or publications ==
- Rojas, Teresa María (1977). Campo oscuro. Miami, FL: Ediciones Universal. OCLC 3257593.
- —— (1980). Capilla ardiente. Miami, FL: Ediciones Isimir. OCLC 7684350.
- Geada, Rita; García Tudurí, Mercedes; Prado, Pura del; ——; Aparicio Laurencio, Angel; Núñez, Ana Rosa (1970). Cinco poetisas cubanas, 1935–1969 : Mercedes Garcia Tuduri, Pura del Prado, Teresa Maria Rojas, Rita Geada, Ana Rosa Nuñez. Miami, FL: Ediciones Universal. OCLC 15379849.
- —— (1996). Hierba dura : antología, (1956–1995). Coral Gables, FL: La Torre de Papel. OCLC 36635030.
- —— (1973). La casa de agua : poemas, 1968–1972. Madrid: Playor. OCLC 2971575.
- —— (1968). Señal en el agua : poemas 1956–1968. San José, C.R.: Imp. Borrase. OCLC 3720930.
