= Exactly Like You (musical) =

Exactly Like You is a 1999 musical with a score by composer Cy Coleman and a book by A. E. Hotchner.

The musical premiered at the Goodspeed Opera House's Norma Terris Theatre in Chester, Connecticut in May 1998. The musical was directed and choreographed by Patricia Birch and featured Barbara Walsh and Michael McGrath,

The musical was next produced Off-Broadway at the York Theatre at St. Peter's running from April 14, 1999 to May 9, 1999. The musical was directed and choreographed by Patricia Birch, the associate director and choreographer was Jonathan Cerullo with sets by James Morgan and costumes by Richard Schurkamp. The cast featured Lauren Ward as Arlene Murphy, Susan Mansur as Priscilla Vanerhosen and Michael McGrath as Martin Murphy.
