= Sophie Isaacs =

English stage actress and singer

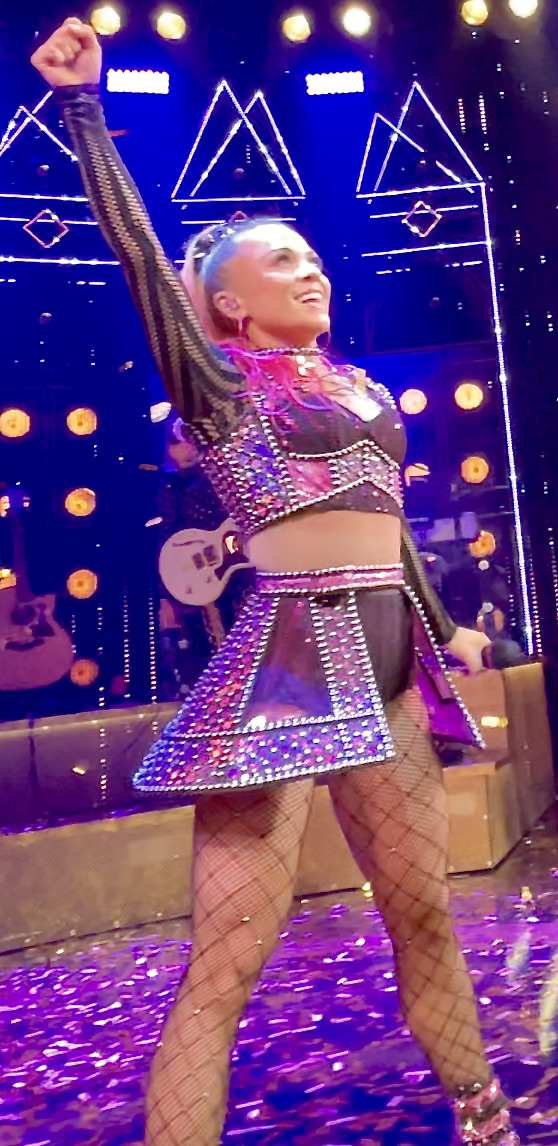
- Isaacs performing in Six in May 2021 at the Lyric Theatre
- Born: 20 September 1988 (age 37); Cheltenham, England
- Occupations: Actress; singer
- Years active: 2009–present
- Height: 156 cm (5 ft 1 in)
- Children: 1

Sophie Isaacs (born 20 September 1988) is an English stage actress and singer. She is known for portraying the role of Heather McNamara in Heathers: The Musical at The Other Palace and Theatre Royal Haymarket and for portraying Katherine Howard in Six at the Arts Theatre, Lyric Theatre and Vaudeville Theatre.

== Career ==
Isaacs started out her professional acting career after graduating from the London School of Musical Theatre (located in Elephant & Castle) in 2009 and then starred in both Hope at the Bridewell Theatre and Zombie Prom at the Landor Theatre, before starring in British soap opera Hollyoaks as character 'Molly Montgomery' in 2010. She then went on to star in the UK touring production of Legally Blonde: The Musical in 2011, portraying 'Margot' and understudying the principal role of Elle Woods and in 2014, she portrayed the role of Amber Von Tussle in a production of musical Hairspray in Singapore and Kuala Lumpur. Isaacs then starred in the West End productions of both Made in Dagenham in 2014, and Kinky Boots in 2015-2016, both at the Adephi Theatre, as well as then portrayed the role of 'Janet Weiss' in the European touring production of The Rocky Horror Show. Isaacs then went on to play the role of Heather McNamara in the original West End production of Heathers: The Musical at The Other Palace and Theatre Royal Haymarket, before portraying 'Goldilocks' in the pantomime Goldilocks & The Three Bears at the London Palladium. Isaacs has appeared in the West End production of Six alongside principal cast members Jarnéia Richard-Noel, Courtney Bowman, Natalie Paris, Alexia McIntosh and Danielle Steers. Six was one of the first musical to return to the West End after the COVID-19 pandemic. Isaacs was part of Six when the show moved to the nearby Vaudeville Theatre. She also starred in a principal role in Pantoland at The Palladium at the afore mentioned London Palladium from December 2021 to January 2022.

=== Theatre credits ===
Year	Production	Role	Venue	Ref
2009	Hope	Miranda	Bridewell Theatre	
2009	Zombie Prom	Toffee	Landor Theatre	
2009	Jack and the Beanstalk	Jill	Devonshire Park Theatre	
2011	Sleeping Beauty	Beauty	Richmond Theatre	
2011	Godspell	Joanne	Union Theatre	
2011-2012	Legally Blonde: The Musical	Margot / Understudy Elle Woods	UK Tour	
2013	Get Got	Sophie Lee	St Columba's by the Castle / 2013 Edinburgh Festival Fringe	
2014	Hairspray	Amber Von Tussle	Singapore and Kuala Lumpur	
2014	Made in Dagenham	Sandra Beaumont	Adelphi Theatre	
2015-2016	Kinky Boots	Ensemble / Understudy Lauren	Adelphi Theatre	
2016	Grease	Frenchie Facciano	Leicester Curve	
2017-2018	The Rocky Horror Show	Janet Weiss	European Tour	
2018	Heathers: The Musical	Heather McNamara	The Other Palace / Theatre Royal Haymarket	
2019	Cruel Intentions: The '90's Musical	Annette Hargrove	George Square Gardens / 2019 Edinburgh Festival Fringe	
2019-2020	Goldilocks & The Three Bears	Goldilocks	London Palladium	
2020-2021	Six	Katherine Howard	Arts Theatre / Lyric Theatre / Vaudeville Theatre	
2021	Disenchanted!	Cinderella	N/A	
2021-2022	Pantoland at The Palladium	Herself	London Palladium	

== Filmography ==
=== Television ===
Year	Title	Role	Broadcasting Channel	Ref
2010	Hollyoaks	Molly	Channel 4	
2013	One Week with Little Grey Fergie	Fern	N/A	
2020	This Morning	Katherine Howard	ITV	
2021	Musicals: The Greatest Show	Katherine Howard	BBC One	
2021	This Morning	Katherine Howard	ITV	

=== Radio ===
Year	Title	Role	Radio Station	Ref
2020	WhatsOnStage Awards 2020 with Elaine Paige and Paddy O’Connell	Herself	BBC Radio 2	
2020	Magic With The Musicals LIVE	Katherine Howard	Magic FM	
2021	Musicals: The Greatest Show	Katherine Howard	BBC Radio 2	
