= Christina Modestou =

Welsh-Greek theatre actress and singer

- Born: April 5, 1989 (age 37); Port Talbot, South Wales
- Education: Arts Educational Schools, Chiswick
- Occupations: Actress and singer
- Years active: 2010-present

Christina Modestou (born 5 April 1989) is a Welsh-Greek theatre actress and singer. She is best known for portraying Anne Boleyn in the musical Six at its beginnings in 2017 at the Arts Theatre in London and later recording the same role for the 2018 studio album.

== Early life and education ==
Modestou is from Port Talbot in South Wales. She took classes at the Mark Jermin Stage School. She went on to train at the Arts Educational School (ArtsEd) in Chiswick, West London.

== Career ==
Modestou first professional job was in the ensemble of We Will Rock You in 2010, where she also covered the role of Killer Queen. In 2014, Modestou was part of the Southwark Playhouse cast of the UK premiere of the musical In the Heights in the role of Nina. The cast included David Bedella as Kevin, Sam Mackay as Usnavi, Emma Kingston as Vanessa, Victoria Hamilton-Barritt as Daniela, Sara Naudi as Carla and Eve Polycarpou as Abuela. The show then transferred to the Charing Cross Theatre with a new cast.

Modestou then joined the cast of Urinetown in 2014, for its run at the Apollo Theatre. Jenna Russell played Penelope Pennywise. The show moved after a successful run at the St. James Theatre.

In 2015 she joined the UK tour cast of Shrek the Musical as part of the ensemble. Following this it was part of the ensemble of the 20th anniversary production of RENT first a The Other Palace and then embarking on a UK tour.

In 2017, she joined the cast of Six for their performances at the Arts Theatre in London. She worked extensively with Lucy Moss and Toby Marlow, the creators of the musical, and despite the fact that the original 2017 performances weren't in costume, Modestou went on to take part in the studio album, singing the role of Anne Boleyn (whom she originated), which was recorded and later released in 2018.

After the release of the studio album, Modestou left the cast of Six and she was replaced with Millie O'Connell in the West End productions and later Andrea Macasaet in the Broadway productions.

In 2018 Modestou was part of the Regent's Park Open Air Theatre production of The Little Shop of Horrors as Ronnette. Other cast member included: fellow Six castmate Renée Lamb and Vicky Vox as Audrey II.

In 2021 Modestou returned to the Open Air Theatre for their production of Carousel, in the role of Claire Pipperidge, directed by Timothy Sheader, who was involved in several Open Air productions through the years.

Following the summer season Modestou was announced as part of the cast of the touring production of Fantastically Great Women Who Changed the World, show inspired by Kate Pankhurst's picture book. Modestou played Gertrude Ederle/Jane Austen/Mary Anning/Anne Frank and was joined by Renée Lamb and Frances Mayli McCann.

== Theatre credits ==
Year	Title	Role	Theatre
2010	We Will Rock You	Ensemble / Cover Killer Queen	Dominion Theatre
2014	In the Heights	Nina	Southwark Playhouse
2014	Urinetown	Cover Hope Caldwell / Little Sally	Apollo Theatre
2015	Shrek the Musical	Mama Bear / Mama Ogre	UK tour
2016–2017	Rent	Ensemble / Cover Maureen / Cover Mimi	The Other Palace and UK Tour
2017–2018	Six	Anne Boleyn	Arts Theatre and 2018 studio album recording
2018	Little Show of Horrors	Ronnette	Regent's Park Open Air Theatre
2018	Shrek the Musical	Dragon	UK tour
2019	The Winter's Tale	Paulina	National Theatre
2019–2020	The Boy in the Dress	Miss Bresslaw	Royal Shakespeare Theatre
2021	Carousel	Claire Pipperidge	Regent's Park Open Air Theatre
2022	Fantastically Great Women Who Changed the World	Gertrude Ederle / Jane Austen / Mary Anning / Anne Frank	UK tour

== Filmography ==
Year	Title	Role
2025	I Swear	Alison
