= Grace Mouat =

English stage actress and podcaster (born 1996)

- Born: Grace Elizabeth Mouat; 12 May 1996 (age 30)
- Education: Guildford School of Acting
- Years active: 2006–present

Grace Elizabeth Mouat (born 12 May 1996) is an English musical theatre actress and podcaster. She is best known as Dance Captain/Swing in the musical Six, cover Juliet in & Juliet, Ella in Rodgers + Hammerstein's Cinderella (Hope Mill Theatre), Izzy in The Great British Bake Off Musical and Karen Smith, a role she originated in the West End production of Mean Girls.

== Early life and education ==
Mouat is from Camberley, Surrey. She is half Burmese and was born with a "Mongolian Blue Spot" on her back, a pigmented birth mark most common on people of Asian descent.

She trained at the Guildford School of Acting, graduating in 2018 with a Bachelor of Arts in Musical Theatre. She was cast in Six during her third and final year of drama school.

== Career ==
=== Acting ===
Mouat began her career in the musical Six, where she was a dance captain and swing. When the show moved to the West End, she was initially covering all six roles, which she had understudied during the 2018 UK tour.

From 2019 to 2022, she was Judith and also first cover Juliet Capulet in Max Martin's jukebox musical & Juliet first in Manchester (2019, Opera House) and then at the Shaftesbury Theatre, after its transfer to London. The musical closed due to the COVID-19 pandemic in 2020 and reopened on 24 September 2021. Grace was nominated for a Mousetrap Award in 2020 in the category "Saved the day", for her contribution as cover Juliet in the musical.

During the pandemic Mouat took part in a concert version of Hair, directed by Arlene Phillips at the Turbine Theatre, with a follow up performance in West End's London Palladium in June 2021 (rescheduled from April 2021).

In July 2021, Mouat also took over the role of Chloe from fellow Six castmate Millie O'Connell in Be More Chill, which played at the Shaftesbury Theatre during & Juliet hiatus (due to the COVID-19 pandemic) until 5 September 2021.

She played Pilar in the revival of Legally Blonde at Regent's Park Open Air Theatre in London, directed by Lucy Moss from May to July 2022. She joined fellow Six cast members Courtney Bowman and Lauren Drew in this gender-bending production of the 2007 show.

Mouat was then cast in the title role of Ella in the European premiere of Rodgers and Hammerstein's Cinderella at the Hope Mill Theatre in Manchester, which was set to open in 2020 and was postponed to 2022, with a run from November to December.

She then played Izzy in the West End transfer of The Great British Bake Off Musical, playing at the Noël Coward Theatre in London. The show released an official cast recording album on 28 April 2023.

In September 2023, full cast was announced for the musical White Christmas, based on the Irving Berlin movie of the same name, with Mouat playing Betty. The show will be running at the Crucible Theatre in Sheffield from December 2023 until January 2024.

Mouat played Lucy Wyman in the workshop of the musical 13 Going on 30 at the Battersea Arts Centre, alongside Lucie Jones as Jenna Rink and Jamie Muscato as Matt Flamhaff. The show was presented for the first time in four public workshop performances in October 2023. This stage production is written by movie writers Josh Goldsmith and Cathy Yuspa and music is by composer/lyricists Alan Zachary and Michael Weiner. The show is directed by Andy Fickman.

From February to March 2024, Mouat played the role of Ami, alongside Jacob Fowler as Ben in the musical Before After at the Southwark Playhouse.

On 27 March 2024, the full cast for the West End debut run of the musical Mean Girls at the Savoy Theatre was announced, with Mouat confirmed to play the role of Karen, originally interpreted by Kate Rockwell in the Original Broadway production of the show. She received a WhatsOnStage Award nomination for Best Supporting Performer in a Musical for her performance.

In September 2025, Mouat re-joined the cast of the musical 13 Going on 30 at Manchester Opera House, in the role of Lucy, which she played in the London workshop of the show. The company was led by Lucie Jones as Jenna and David Hunter as Matt alongside Caleb Roberts as Richard, Andrew Berlin as Kyle Grandy and Dominic Andersen as Alex. Following the UK run, the show announced a North American tour.

On 4 February 2026 (Jonathan Larson's birthday) it was announced that The Jonathan Larson Project, a selection of the composer's work, would be performed in London in summer of the same year at the Southwark Playhouse. The company included Max Harwood, Marcus Collins, Michael Mather, Mouat and Imelda Warren-Green. Mouat left the show due to other professional commitments and was replaced by Natalie Kassanga in May 2026.

Following various cast absences, Mouat joined the cast of the tour of the musical Legally Blonde in Milton Keynes on 14 March 2026, for a one-night-only concert performance. Mouat played the role of Serena, while Jodie Steele covered Paulette.

In June 2026 a full cast of the UK premiere of Death Note: the Musical was announced, with Mouat playing Rem. The show played at the Barbican for a limited season, July to September 2026. Also in the cast Telly Leung as Ryuk and Paolo Montalban as Soichiro Yagami.

=== Music ===
Mouat is part of the all female group SVN, together with original Six cast members Jarnéia Richard-Noel (Jaye’J), Millie O’Connell, Natalie Paris, Alexia McIntosh (Lexi), Aimie Atkinson, and Maiya Quansah-Breed. The idea for the group was suggested by McIntosh when Six opened in Edinburgh in 2018.

In 2021, SVN released their first original song 'Stars', with their second single 'Woman' announced on 28 April 2022 and focusing on female empowerment.

==== Discography ====
Year	Title	Artist	Album	Ref
2021	"Queen"	SVN	Question	
2021	"Stars"	SVN	Question	
2022	"Woman"	SVN	Question	
2022	"Free"	SVN	Question	
2022	"Boss"	SVN	Question	

=== Vlogging ===
In July 2023, Mouat started hosting a podcast called "Cut to the Grace". In each episode, she chats with West End stars, music artists, vloggers and television personalities. Among her guests Alice Fearn, Oliver Tompsett, Kerry Ellis, Luke Bayer and Louise Dearman, chatting about their careers and how they got where they are today.

== Stage credits ==
Year(s)	Production	Role	Location	Category	Ref.
2016	Spring Awakening	Fräulein Knuppeldick	Leicester Curve	Regional	
2018-19	Six	Swing	UK Tour and Arts Theatre	UK tour and West End	
2019-22	& Juliet	Judith/Alternate Juliet	Shaftesbury Theatre	West End	
2021	Hair	Crissy	Turbine Theatre, London Palladium and Mayflower Theatre (Southampton)	Off West End, West End and Regional	
2021	Be More Chill	Chloe Valentine	Shaftesbury Theatre	West End	
2022	Legally Blonde	Pilar	Regent's Park, Open Air Theatre	Off West End	
2022	The Secret Garden	Alice	London Palladium	West End	
2022	Rodgers and Hammerstein's Cinderella	Ella	Hope Mill Theatre	Regional	
2023	The Great British Bake Off Musical	Izzy	Noël Coward Theatre	West End	
2023	13 Going on 30	Lucy Wyman	Battersea Arts Centre	Workshop	
2023-24	White Christmas	Betty	Sheffield Crucible	Regional	
2024	Before After	Ami	Southwark Playhouse	Off West End	
2024	Gypsy	Louise	Manchester Opera House	Concert	
2024-25	Mean Girls	Karen Smith	Savoy Theatre	West End	
2025	13 Going on 30	Lucy Wyman	Manchester Opera House	Out-of-town tryout	
2025	Acorn Antiques	Miss Wellbelove	Hope Mill Theatre	Regional	
2026	Legally Blonde	Serena	Milton Keynes Theatre	Emergency tour replacement	
2026	Smalltown Boy	Julia	@sohoplace	West End, workshop	
2026	Natasha, Pierre & the Great Comet of 1812	Natasha Rostova	Shanghai Grand Theatre	Staged concert	
2026	Death Note: The Musical	Rem	Barbican Theatre	Off West End	
