= Millie O'Connell =

British stage actress and singer

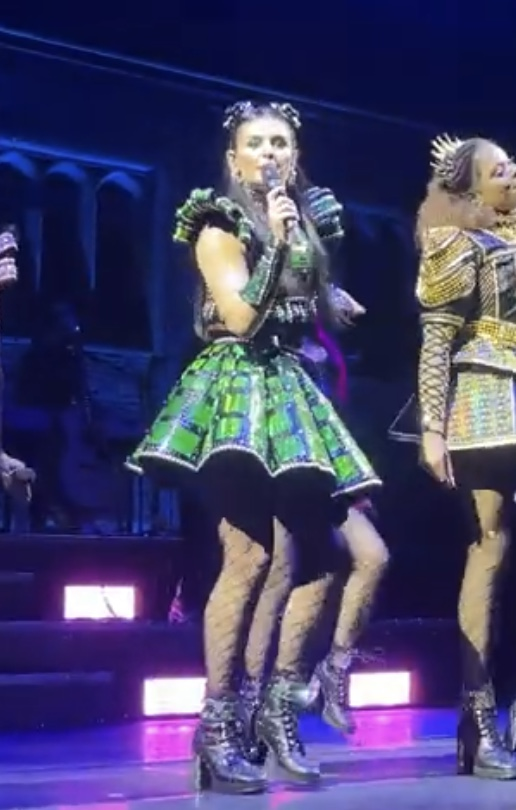
- O'Connell performing at Hampton Court Palace in 2022
- Born: Emilia Rose O'Connell; 18 January 1997 (age 29); Shanklin, Isle of Wight, England
- Years active: 2015–present

Millie O'Connell (born 18 January 1997) is an English musical theatre actress and singer. She is best known for portraying Anne Boleyn in the original UK tour and West End production of the musical SIX. She is part of pop girl group SVN. She has received Laurence Olivier and WhatsOnStage Award nominations.

== Early life ==
O'Connell is from Shanklin, Isle of Wight, England. She is of Maltese, Irish, and Italian descent. From the age of three, O'Connell took classes at the Gillian Cartwright School of Dance. She attended Christ the King College. After completing her GCSEs at 16, she won a scholarship to train at Laine Theatre Arts in Epsom, graduating in 2015, aged 18.

== Career ==
O'Connell made her professional stage debut in the international revival of the show 42nd Street in 2016, in Théâtre du Châtelet, Paris, forming part of the ensemble whilst understudying Peggy Sawyer. In 2017, she moved back to the UK, performing in the same show in Theatre Royal, Drury Lane, forming part of the ensemble whilst understudying Anytime Annie. In 2018 she joined the UK tour cast of Thoroughly Modern Millie, understudying Millie Dillmount.

Her rise to fame stemmed from her role of Anne Boleyn in the original UK tour cast of SIX in 2018. The show's success gave it a permanent home in the West End's Arts Theatre, where she starred in the show until October 2019. Prior to leaving the show, Millie had played the most shows out of every actress in the original West End cast.

Late 2019 brought O'Connell the role of Velcro in Soho Cinders at Charing Cross Theatre. In 2020 she starred in Be More Chill as Chloe Valentine in The Other Palace. She left the show two weeks before its original closing date to rehearse for Hair at the Turbine Theatre, where she portrayed the role of Jeanie. Following this, Millie landed 'her dream role' of Maureen Johnson in Rent. She starred in this revival alongside Six cast alumna Maiya Quansah-Breed, portraying the leading role of Mimi Marquez and Jocasta Almgill, as her partner Joanne. Due to COVID-19, the show only had five live performances before shutting due to government guidelines. In response to this, the team livestreamed a recorded version of the show during lockdown. They returned to the show in 2021, Millie returning to the role.

In 2021, Millie returned to the role of Chloe Valentine in Be More Chill, showing at the Shaftesbury Theatre, and then returned to the role of Jeanie in Hair, showing in the London Palladium.

In April 2022, it was announced that The Cher Show would be touring the UK. Millie took on the role of Babe (Cher) on the year long tour. The show launched at the Curve Theatre in Leicester. The creative team included director Arlene Phillips, choreographer Oti Mabuse and costume designer Gabriella Slade.

August 2022 brought the original cast of SIX together to film a proshot, and Millie, reunited with her castmates, were granted the opportunity to reprise their roles once more at Hampton Court Palace in July.

=== SVN ===
Millie also forms a part of the pop girl group SVN (pronounced 'seven') alongside six former West End cast members of SIX: Jarnéia Richard-Noel, Natalie May Paris, Alexia McIntosh (Lexi), Aimie Atkinson and Maiya Quansah-Breed, and Grace Mouat (former swing and dance captain of the original cast of Six). After a limited series of concerts in October 2020, their debut concert was rescheduled from February 2022 to 7 August 2022 at the O2 Academy Islington, with the group releasing singles such as Stars (2021) and Woman, Free, Boss and At Christmas (2022).

==== Discography ====
Songs released
Year	Title	Artist	Album
2021	Queen	SVN	SVN
2021	Stars	SVN	SVN
2022	Woman	SVN	SVN
2022	Free	SVN	SVN
2022	BOSS	SVN	SVN
2022	At Christmas	SVN	SVN

==== Concerts ====
Year	Concert	Date	Venue	Producer	Notes (if necessary)
2020	Girl Power: the Reunion	10-11 October	Oval Space, Cambridge Heath, London	Aimie Atkinson	-
2022	SIX: Live at Hampton Court Palace	19-20 June	Hampton Court Palace	Kenny Wax	Members did not perform as SVN but as their significant roles in SIX. Grace Mouat did not feature in the event.
2022	SVN	7 August	O2 Academy Islington	SVN	Production all in-house; BOSS music video on set, with MBV productions and Genesis Lynea

== Personal life ==
O'Connell is openly queer.

== Filmography ==
Year	Title	Role	Broadcasting channel	Notes
2015	The People's Strictly for Comic Relief	Dancer	BBC	N/a
2016	The Entire Universe	Dancer	BBC	N/a
2018	This Morning	Anne Boleyn	ITV	N/a
2019	The One Show	Anne Boleyn	BBC One	N/a
2019	Olivier Awards	Anne Boleyn	ITV	N/a
2019	BUILD Ldn	Herself	The Build Series LDN	N/a
2020	Rent	Maureen Johnson	-	N/a
2022	This Morning	Herself	ITV	N/a
2023	Wonka	Tram Lady 2/Dancer	N/A	N/a
2025	Doctor Who	Sunshine Sally	BBC	Lux (Series 15, episode 2)

== Stage ==
Year	Production	Role	Notes
2015	Laine Leaps Ahead	Lead / Featured Singer	Epsom Playhouse
2016	Aladdin	Slave of the Ring / Understudy Jasmine	Civic Theatre
2016	42nd Street	Ensemble / Understudy Peggy Sawyer	Théâtre du Châtelet, Paris
2017	42nd Street	Ensemble/Understudy Anytime Annie	Theatre Royal Drury Lane
2018	42nd Street	Ensemble/Understudy Anytime Annie	Theatre Royal Drury Lane
2018	SIX	Anne Boleyn	UK tour
2019	SIX	Anne Boleyn	Arts Theatre
2019	Soho Cinders	Velcro	Charing Cross Theatre
2020	Be More Chill	Chloe Valentine	The Other Palace
2020	Hair	Jeanie	Turbine Theatre
2020	Rent	Maureen Johnson	Hope Mill Theatre, Manchester
2020	Catfish the Musical	DD	Stars Concept Cast
2020	Halls	Natalie	Stars Concept Cast
2021	Rent	Maureen Johnson	Hope Mill Theatre, Manchester
2021	Be More Chill	Chloe Valentine	Shaftesbury Theatre
2021	Hair	Jeanie	London Palladium
2022	The Cher Show	Babe (Cher)	UK & Ireland tour
2022	Six the Musical: Live at Hampton Court Palace	Anne Boleyn	Hampton Court Palace
2023	Sleeping Beauty: The Fairy's Tale	Sleeping Beauty	Norwich Theatre
2025	Come Fall In Love - The DDLJ Musical	Cookie	
2026	Cats	Demeter	Regent's Park Open Air Theater

== Awards and nominations ==
Year	Award	Category	Work	Result	Ref.
2019	Laurence Olivier Awards	Best Actress in a Supporting Role in a Musical	SIX	Nominated	(Note: Shared with SIX cast)
2022	WhatsOnStage Awards	Best Supporting Actress in a Musical	Rent	Nominated	
