= Laurence Olivier Award for Best Actress in a Supporting Role in a Musical =

Annual award for London theatre

- Awarded for: Best Actress in a Supporting Role in a Musical
- Location: England
- Presented by: Society of London Theatre
- First award: 2015
- Currently held by: Victoria Hamilton-Barritt for Paddington: The Musical (2026)
- Website: officiallondontheatre.com/olivier-awards/

The Laurence Olivier Award for Best Actress in a Supporting Role in a Musical is an annual award presented by the Society of London Theatre in recognition of the "world-class status of London theatre." The awards were established as the Society of West End Theatre Awards in 1976, and renamed in 1984 in honour of English actor and director Laurence Olivier.

This award was created in 2015, along with the Best Actor in a Supporting Role in a Musical, to replace the singular award for Best Performance in a Supporting Role in a Musical, which existed from 1991 to 2014.

== Winners and nominees ==
=== 2010s ===
Year	Performer	Musical	Character
2015	Lorna Want	Beautiful	Cynthia Weil
2015	Samantha Bond	Dirty Rotten Scoundrels	Muriel Eubanks
2015	Haydn Gwynne	Women on the Verge of a Nervous Breakdown	Lucia
2015	Nicole Scherzinger	Cats	Grizabella
2016
2016	Lara Pulver	Gypsy	Gypsy Rose Lee
2016	Preeya Kalidas	Bend It Like Beckham	Pinky
2016	Amy Lennox	Kinky Boots	Lauren
2016	Emma Williams	Mrs Henderson Presents	Maureen
2017
2017	Rebecca Trehearn	Show Boat	Julie LaVerne
2017	Haydn Gwynne	The Threepenny Opera	Celia Peachum
2017	Victoria Hamilton-Barritt	Murder Ballad	The Narrator
2017	Emma Williams	Half a Sixpence	Helen Walsingham
2018
2018	Sheila Atim	Girl from the North Country	Marianne Lane
2018	Tracie Bennett	Follies	Carlotta Campion
2018	Rachel John	Hamilton	Angelica Schuyler
2018	Lesley Joseph	Young Frankenstein	Frau Blücher
2019
2019	Patti LuPone	Company	Joanne
2019	Aimie Atkinson; Alexia McIntosh; Millie O'Connell; Natalie Paris; Maiya Quansah-Breed; Jarnéia Richard-Noel	SIX	Katherine Howard; Anne of Cleves; Anne Boleyn; Jane Seymour; Catherine Parr; Catherine of Aragon
2019	Ruthie Ann Miles	The King and I	Lady Thiang
2019	Rachel Tucker	Come from Away	Beverley Bass, Annette and others

=== 2020s ===
Year	Performer	Musical	Character
2020	Cassidy Janson	& Juliet	Anne Hathaway
2020	Lucy Anderson	Dear Evan Hansen	Zoe Murphy
2020	Petula Clark	Mary Poppins	Bird Woman
2020	Lauren Ward	Dear Evan Hansen	Cynthia Murphy
2021	Not presented due to extended closing of theatre productions during COVID-19 pandemic (Note: Due to late March 2020 to late July 2021 closing of London theatre productions during the COVID-19 pandemic in England, the 2022 awards recognise productions that launched anytime from February 2020 to February 2022)		
2022	Liza Sadovy	Cabaret	Fraulein Schneider
2022	Victoria Hamilton-Barritt	Cinderella	Stepmother
2022	Carly Mercedes Dyer	Anything Goes	Erma
2022	Gabrielle Brooks	Get Up, Stand Up! The Bob Marley Musical	Rita Marley
2023
2023	Beverley Knight	Sylvia	Emmeline Pankhurst
2023	Maimuna Memon	Standing at the Sky's Edge	Nikki
2023	Liza Sadovy	Oklahoma!	Aunt Eller Murphy
2023	Marisha Wallace	Oklahoma!	Ado Annie Carnes
2024
2024	Amy Trigg	The Little Big Things	Agnes
2024	Grace Hodgett Young	Sunset Boulevard	Betty Schaefer
2024	Zoë Roberts	Operation Mincemeat	Johnny Bevan & Others
2024	Eleanor Worthington-Cox	Next to Normal	Natalie Goodman
2025
2025	Maimuna Memon	Natasha, Pierre & The Great Comet of 1812	Sonia Rostova
2025	Liv Andrusier	Fiddler on the Roof	Tzeitel
2025	Amy Di Bartolomeo	The Devil Wears Prada	Emily
2025	Beverley Klein	Fiddler on the Roof	Yente
2026
2026	Victoria Hamilton-Barritt	Paddington: The Musical	Millicent Clyde
2026	Tracie Bennett	Here We Are	Woman
2026	Amy Booth-Steel	Paddington: The Musical	Lady Sloane
2026	Kate Fleetwood	Into The Woods	The Witch
2026	Georgina Onuorah	Shucked	Lulu

== Multiple awards and nominations ==
Awards

Nominations

Three Nominations

- Victoria Hamilton-Barritt

Two Nominations

- Haydn Gwynne
- Emma Williams
- Liza Sadovy
- Maimuna Memon
- Tracie Bennett

== See also ==
- Laurence Olivier Award for Best Performance in a Supporting Role in a Musical
- Lists of acting awards
- List of awards for supporting actor
- Tony Award for Best Featured Actress in a Musical
