= Samantha Pauly =

American actress

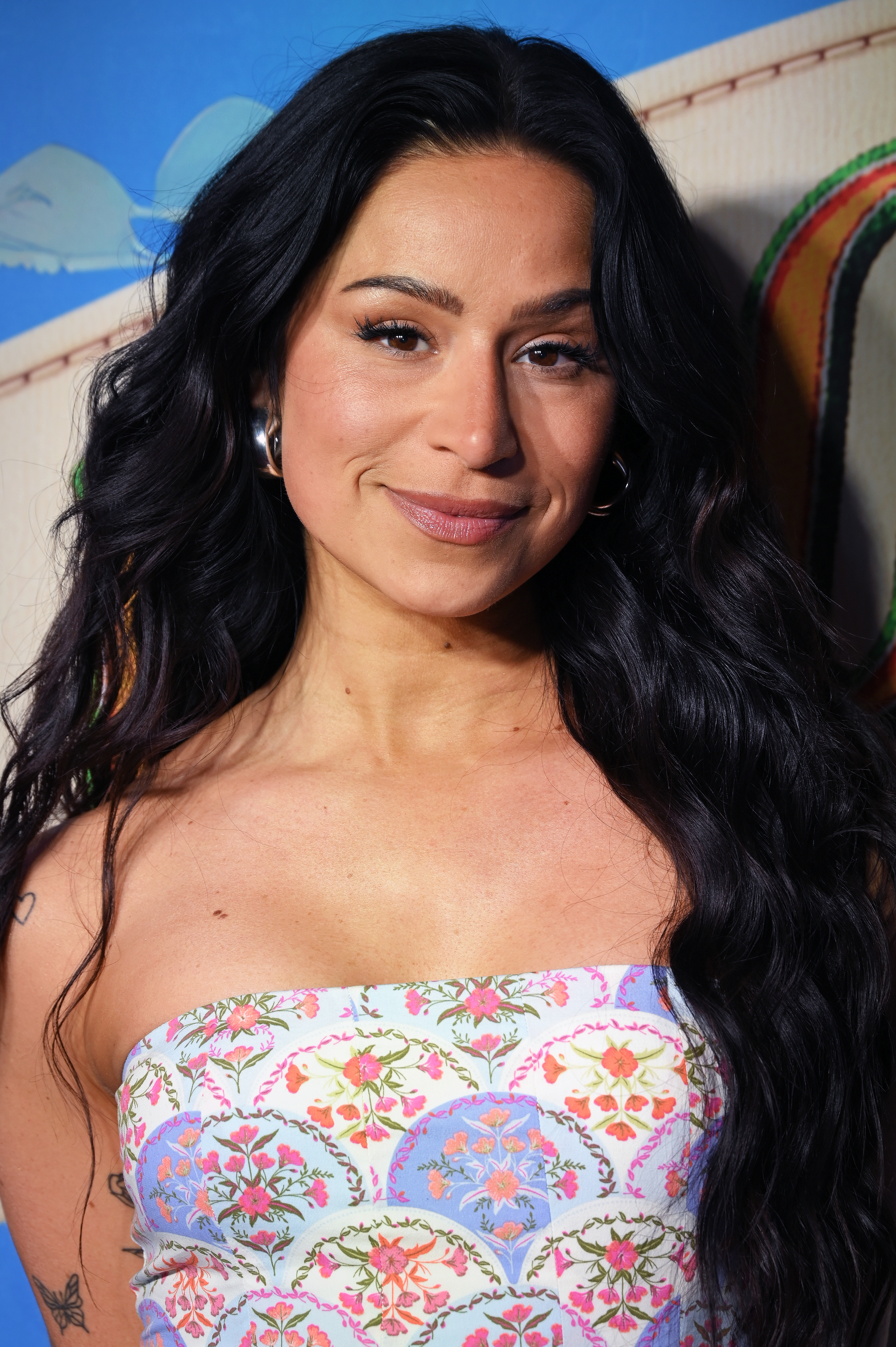
- Pauly in 2026
- Born: Samantha Megan Pauly; November 20, 1989 (age 36); Bettendorf, Iowa, U.S.
- Education: Viterbo University (BFA, 2012)
- Occupations: Actress; singer
- Years active: 2010–present
- Website: samanthapauly.com

Samantha Megan Pauly (born 1989) is an American actress and singer. She is best known for her role as Katherine Howard in the musical Six at the Lena Horne Theatre on Broadway, as well as for starring as Jordan Baker in The Great Gatsby at The Broadway Theatre.She was also hand-picked by Jamie Lloyd and Andrew Lloyd Webber to portray Eva Perón in the 2019 revival of Evita at the Regent's Park Open Air Theatre.

== Early life and education ==
Pauly was born in Bettendorf, Iowa. From 2004 to 2008, she attended Pleasant Valley High School in Riverdale, Iowa, where she did not become interested in musical theatre until her junior year. In high school, she appeared in productions of The Pajama Game as Gladys and Chicago as Velma Kelly. The production of Chicago was later selected to perform at the International Thespian Festival in June 2008. She later trained at Viterbo University and graduated with a Bachelor of Fine Arts degree in Music Theatre and Dance in 2012. Pauly played numerous roles while training, including Rona Lisa Peretti in The 25th Annual Putnam County Spelling Bee, Joanne in Company, and Cathy Hiatt in The Last Five Years.

== Career ==
In 2010, Pauly appeared in the University of Wisconsin-La Crosse's Summerstage theatre production of Rent at Toland Theatre, playing the role of Mimi. Her first production after graduating from Viterbo University in 2012 was playing the lead role of Elle Woods in the musical Legally Blonde at the Circa '21 Dinner Playhouse. In 2014, she portrayed The Mistress in Evita at the Jedlicka Theatre.

In 2015, Pauly played the role of Teen Cee Cee in Beaches alongside Presley Ryan and Shoshana Bean, who played the child and adult versions of the role respectively. She also portrayed Eva Perón in Evita as an alternate at the Marriott Theatre. In January 2016, she played Amber in a regional production of Hairspray at the Paramount Theatre in Aurora, Illinois. Later the same year, she appeared in an episode of Chicago P.D. titled "Big Friends, Big Enemies". In 2017, Pauly played the roles of Betsy in Honeymoon in Vegas at the Marriott Theatre and Jovie in Elf at the Paramount Theatre.

In 2018, Pauly was cast as Valkyrie in the North American tour of Bat Out of Hell: The Musical. The tour opened at the Ed Mirvish Theatre in Toronto on October 16, 2018, and was originally intended to run until July 7, 2019, at the AT&T Performing Arts Center in Dallas. However, days after the tour was extended, it was abruptly postponed and eventually canceled, with the cast playing their final show at the scheduled conclusion of the Toronto run on November 3, 2018. Pauly has stated that the experience nearly made her quit performing altogether. In 2018, she portrayed Eva Perón as a principal at the Westport Country Playhouse.

In February 2019, Pauly received callbacks for both Six and Evita and ended up being cast in both shows. She made her debut as Katherine Howard in Six on May 14, 2019 at the Chicago Shakespeare Theater. She temporarily left the show on June 23, 2019, after she was hand-picked by Jamie Lloyd and Andrew Lloyd Webber to star as Eva Perón in Evita at the Regent's Park Open Air Theatre from August 2 until September 21, 2019. Pauly returned to Six in the Citadel Theatre production on November 1, 2019, and played the role for the rest of the North American tour. She continued playing the role when the show transferred to the Lena Horne Theatre on Broadway, where it began previews on February 13, 2020. The show was prepared to open on March 12, 2020, when all Broadway theatres were required to close due to the COVID-19 pandemic. Pauly returned to Six on September 17, 2021, when the show officially reopened. A live cast recording of the musical featuring Pauly's vocals was released on May 6, 2022. The album was nominated for Best Musical Theater Album at the 65th Annual Grammy Awards in 2023. In June 2022, she, along with the other principal cast members of Six, received the Ensemble Award at the 2022 Drama Desk Awards. She departed the production on December 4, 2022.

In 2021, Pauly appeared as an ensemble member in the online benefit concert of Ratatouille the Musical. Later that year, she was featured on the concept album for Little Black Book, a musical inspired by the life of Heidi Fleiss. She also portrayed Ophelia in a musical adaptation of Shakespeare's Hamlet in August 2021. On February 4, 2022, Pauly appeared in a concert version of the musical A Girl I Know at Feinstein's/54 Below.

Through 22-27 August 2023, Pauly played Mimi Marquez in Rent at the UC Davis Health Pavilion Theater at Music Circus on Broadway. In September 2023, Pauly was announced to be playing the role of Jordan Baker in a musical adaptation of The Great Gatsby from October 12 to November 12, 2023. She had auditioned for the part in March 2023. She reprised her role in the original cast of the Broadway production at the Broadway Theatre when it opened on April 25, 2024. She played her final performance with the production on July 26, 2026.

== Personal life ==
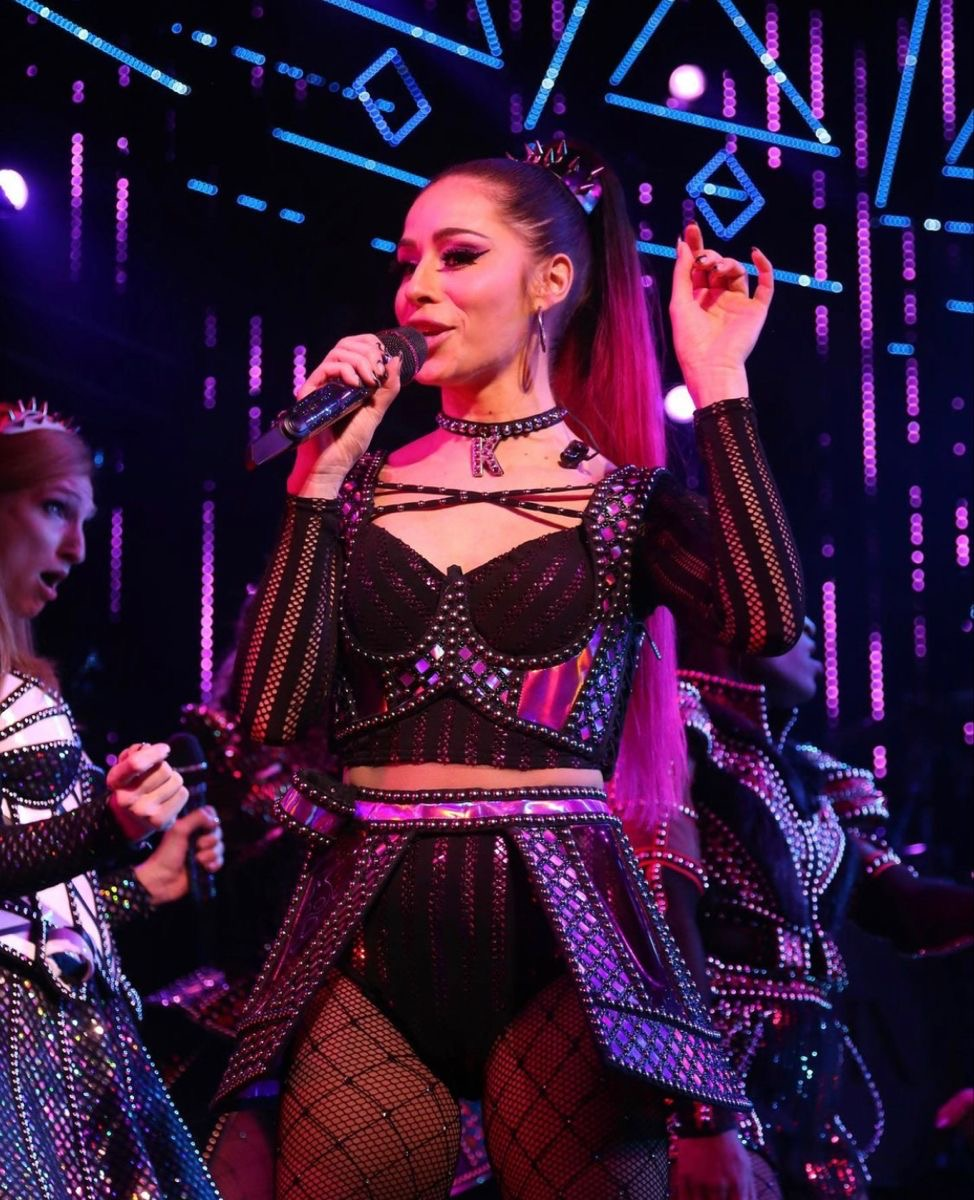
Pauly in SIX as Katherine Howard.

Pauly got married in 2014. In 2022, it was announced the couple had filed for divorce. She participated in a Playbill Pride event in 2024 and stated "This will be my first year being a part of Pride in Times Square, and as a queer woman who is still discovering things about herself, I feel very honored to be included."

She adopted a retired racing greyhound named Dale while living in Chicago. He passed away on December 9, 2024. She also has two short haired chihuahuas named Scampi, whom she adopted in late 2022, and Slinky, whom she adopted in 2026. Pauly states that if she wasn't working in theatre, she would want to work for a dog rescue.

== Theatre credits ==
Year	Title	Role	Theatre	Director(s)	Ref.
2010	Rent	Mimi Marquez	Toland Theatre	Mary Leonard	
2012	Legally Blonde	Elle Woods	Circa '21 Dinner Theatre	Jim Hesselman	
2014	Evita	The Mistress	Jedlicka Performing Arts Center	Dante J. Orfei, Christopher Pazdernik	
2014	Godspell	Samantha	Marriott Theatre	Matt Raftery	
2014	Cinderella...After the Ball	Sleeping Beauty	Marriott Theatre	Scott Weinstein	
2015	Beaches	Teen Cee Cee	Drury Lane Theatre	Eric D. Schaeffer	
2015	Seussical	Bird Girl	Marriott Theatre	Rachel Rockwell	
2015	Elf	Shawanda/Charlotte Dennon	Marriott Theatre	Marc Robin	
2016	Hairspray	Amber von Tussle	Paramount Theatre	Amber Mak	
2016	Evita	Eva Perón (alt.)	Marriott Theatre	Alex Sanchez	
2017	Madagascar: A Musical Adventure	Maurice	Marriott Theatre	Matt Raftery	
2017	Honeymoon in Vegas	Betsy Nolan	Marriott Theatre	Gary Griffin	
2017–2018	Elf	Jovie	Paramount Theatre	Amber Mak	
2018	Evita	Eva Perón	Westport Country Playhouse	Connor Deane	
2018	Bat Out of Hell: The Musical	Valkyrie (u/s Raven)	Ed Mirvish Theatre	Jay Scheib	
2019	Seussical	Bird Girl/Mrs. Mayor	Marriott Theatre	William Carlos Angulo	
2019	Six	Katherine Howard	North American tour	Jamie Armitage, Lucy Moss	
2019	Evita	Eva Perón	Regent's Park Open Air Theatre	Jamie Lloyd	
2020–2022	Six	Katherine Howard	Lena Horne Theatre	Jamie Armitage, Lucy Moss	
2023	Rent	Mimi Marquez	Broadway at Music Circus	Marcos Santana	
2023	The Great Gatsby	Jordan Baker	Paper Mill Playhouse	Marc Bruni	
2024–2026	The Great Gatsby	Jordan Baker	Broadway Theatre	Marc Bruni	

== Filmography ==
Television

Year	Title	Role	Notes
2016	Chicago P.D.	May	Episode: "Big Friends, Big Enemies"

== Awards and nominations ==
Year	Award	Category	Nominated work	Results
2022	Drama Desk Award	Ensemble Award	Six	Won
2024	Broadway.com Audience Awards	Favorite Featured Actress in a Musical	The Great Gatsby	Nominated
