= Aimie Atkinson =

British actress (born 1987)

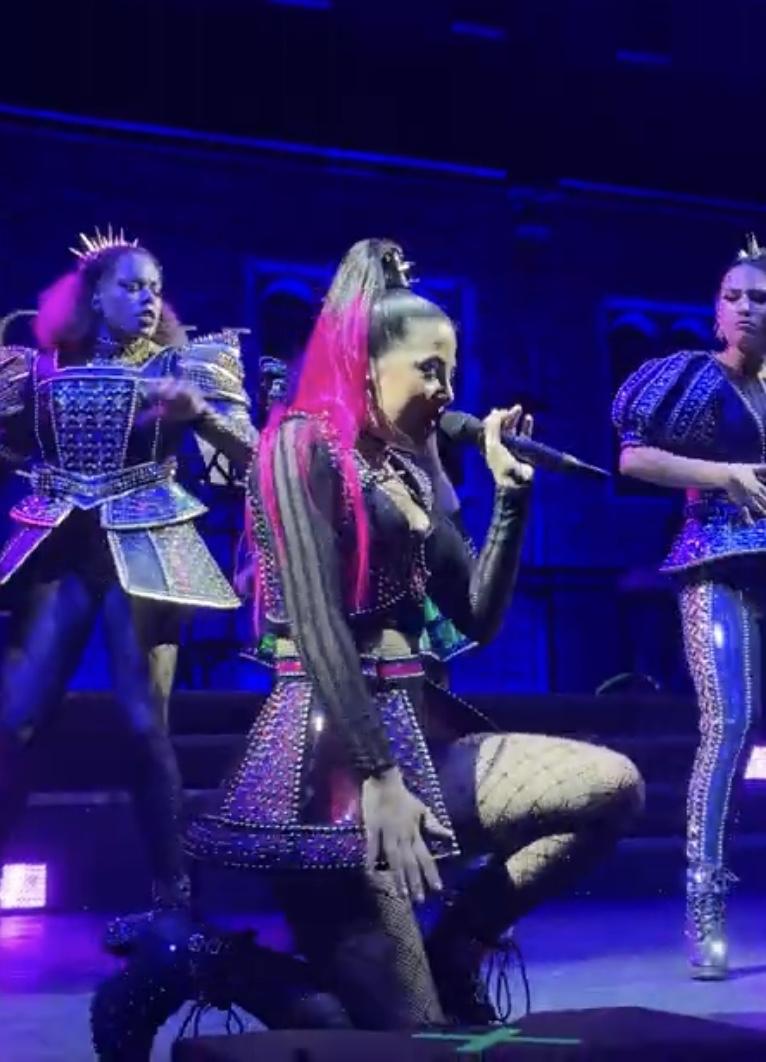
- Atkinson performing at Hampton Court Palace in 2022
- Born: Aimie Allen-Atkinson; 5 June 1987 (age 39); Stevenage, England
- Occupations: Actress; singer
- Years active: 2006–present
- Website: www.aimieatkinson.com

Aimie Allen-Atkinson (born 5 June 1987) is an English stage actress and singer. She is known for portraying the role of Katherine Howard in British comedy musical SIX on the original UK tour and in the West End production at the Arts Theatre, Lyric Theatre and Vaudeville Theatre, portraying Vivian Ward in the West End production of Pretty Woman, as well as forming part of pop girl group SVN.

== Early life ==
Atkinson was born to parents Faith Allen and Tom Atkinson in Stevenage, England. Her father played part-time in a rock band, which encouraged her to begin singing from a young age. Whilst studying at Collenswood School in Stevenage, Atkinson was part of the Fusion Performing Arts group and took part in many of their productions. Having studied to GCSE level, and then worked as an admin assistant in a music publishing company. She also ran a franchise for the Stagecraft school in Stevenage.

== Career ==
After agreeing with a friend whilst studying at the Arts Educational School that both should apply to the BBC Radio 2 Voice of Musical Theatre competition, Atkinson was told that she could only apply for the amateur competition. After winning that, she joined a final competition against the final professional contestants – those with at least five years of stage experience – and also won that.

Aged 19, Atkinson left Arts Educational and became a full-time stage actress, taking her first professional job in Howard Goodall's Days of Hope at the King's Head Theatre. She then took on various parts, before starting an intensive course in musical theatre at the Royal Academy of Music. After completing two months in RAM and one month in Arts Educational Schools, she left after two months to join the UK touring production of Zorro, playing the part of Luisa. Subsequently, landing a part in a musical as a sassy 40-year-old singer, the producer of the show then asked Atkinson to audition for the role of Daniela in the musical In The Heights, which she subsequently played at the King's Cross Theatre. She has since played Princess Jasmine in Aladdin alongside Priscilla Presley, Serena in Legally Blonde at Kilworth House, and Snow White opposite Jerry Hall at Richmond Theatre. She has also originated the role of Katherine Howard in the West End production of SIX.

On 13 February 2020, Atkinson began playing the role of Vivian Ward in the West End production of Pretty Woman: The Musical alongside Danny Mac at the Piccadilly Theatre. The show later officially opened on 2 March 2020, but closed only two weeks later due to the COVID-19 pandemic. Atkinson returned to the show for its reopening at the Savoy Theatre on 8 July 2021. The show closed in June 2023 and announced a UK and Ireland tour.

In May 2023 it was announced that Death Note: The Musical will have its English premiere at the London Palladium in August. Cast included Atkinson as Rem, Adam Pascal as Ryuk, Frances Mayli McCann as Misa, Dean John-Wilson as L and Joaquin Pedro Valdes as Light. The show is due to transfer to the Lyric Theatre in September 2023 for six additional performances with Georgie Maguire, Jessica Lee and Carl Man taking on the roles of Ryuk, Misa and alternate L respectively.

In February 2024, she was selected to compete in the final of Una voce per San Marino 2024, the Sammarinese national selection for the Eurovision Song Contest 2024, with the song "A Dare for Love".

In September 2024, Playbill announced that Figaro: An Original Musical will have its West End Concert premiere at the London Palladium. Cast included Atkinson as Lucia, Cayleigh Capaldi as Sienna, and Jon Robyns as Figaro.

=== Recording and music ===
Atkinson released her debut studio album Step Inside of Love with Jay Records in 2017. As a member of the girl group Goldstone, she competed in Eurovision: You Decide 2018 with the song "I Feel The Love". Atkinson's recordings include:

- Step Inside Love – debut solo album
- I Feel The Love – BBC
- 100 Greatest Musicals – recorded at Abbey Road Studios
- Postman and The Poet
- Kurt Weill's One Touch of Venus
- SIX: The Musical (Studio Cast Recording)

In 2021, Atkinson formed a seven piece girl group called SVN with six other members of the original West End cast of SIX, Millie O'Connell, Natalie Paris, Alexia McIntosh, Jarnéia Richard-Noel, Maiya Quansah-Breed, and Grace Mouat. In 2022, the group released a number of singles such as "Woman" and "Free"

On 18 June 2021, Atkinson released the single "Pretty Woman", a contemporary reimagining of Roy Orbison's Pretty Woman.

== Personal life ==
Atkinson has dated both women and men.

She is currently married to fellow West End actor John Dalgleish.

Her Charity work includes a ‘24 Hour Musical-A-Thon’ live stream with her flatmate at the time of Thomas ‘Tom’ Gribby on Instagram for Save the Children’s ‘Coronavirus Charity Appeal’ to which in total raised over £10,421 during the COVID-19 pandemic on the 30th-31 May 2020.

== Discography ==
Year	Song	Album	Artist	Notes
2016	–	Step Inside Love	Aimie Atkinson	With additional features
2018	"I Feel the Love"	–	Goldstone	Entry for Eurovision: You Decide 2018
2018	"All You Wanna Do"	SIX: The Musical (Studio Cast Recording)	SIX (Studio Cast)	With additional features
2021	"Pretty Woman"	–	Aimie Atkinson	Cover of Roy Orbison's Pretty Woman
2021	"QUEEN"	–	SVN	Cover of Jessie J
2021	"Stars"	Stars	SVN	–
2022	"Woman"	Woman	SVN	–
2022	"I Want To Spend My Lifetime Loving You"	Loving You	Josh Piterman featuring Aimie Atkinson	–
2022	"FREE"	FREE	SVN	–
2022	"BOSS"	BOSS	SVN	–
2022	"At Christmas"	At Christmas	SVN	Christmas Special
2024	"A Dare For Love"		Aimie Atkinson	Entry for Una Voce per San Marino 2024

=== Concert performances ===
- ‘'Fridays Night is Music Night’' on many occasions.
- Barbara Windsor's 70th Birthday BBC Radio 2 live from Hackney Empire.
- Great British Musical (Perfect Pitch) – What's On Stage Awards.
- Stephen Sondheim's 70th Birthday Concert.

== Filmography ==
- Nikki Martin – Doctors, BBC.
- Anna Karenina – American Express Commercial.
- Voice over for Thompson Holidays.
- Snow White I-dents – Christmas Special, GMTV.
- Snow White Documentary 'Seven Dwarfs', Channel 4,
- Backing vocalists for 'The Michael Ball Show' and 'Britain's Got Talent', ITV.
- BBC Wales ‘Search for a Musical Theatre Star’ and subsequently ‘A Musical Star is Born’.

== Audio ==
Year	Project	Episode	Role	Streaming App	Ref.
2018	The Sheep Chronicles III: The Jack and the Beans Talk	–	Chilli Bean	Spotify	
2021	The Painkiller Podcast	#17 Fib by Annie Williams	Jamie	Spotify	

== Awards and nominations ==
Year	Work	Award	Category	Result
2006		BBC Radio 2	Voice of Musical Theatre Award	Won
2019	SIX	Olivier Awards	Best Actress in a Supporting Role in a Musical	Nominated
