= Anna Uzele =

American musical theatre actress

Anna Uzele is an American actress and singer from Delaware. She is known for her performance as Catherine Parr in the original Broadway cast of the musical SIX and for her performance as Francine Evans in the Broadway musical New York, New York. In 2023, she costarred in Jason Katims' television series Dear Edward as Adriana Washington.

== Theatre credits ==
Year(s)	Title	Role	Location	Notes
2023	New York, New York	Francine Evans	St. James Theatre	Broadway
2021-2022	Six	Catherine Parr	Lena Horne Theatre	Broadway
2018	Once on This Island	Andrea, Storyteller, Ti Moune (u/s)	Circle in the Square Theatre	Broadway

== Awards ==
In 2023, Uzele was nominated for the Drama Desk Award Outstanding Lead Performance in a Musical for her role in New York, New York.
