= Jasmine Forsberg =

American singer and performer

Jasmine Forsberg (born 8 September 1999) is an American stage actress and songwriter. Starting in December 2023, she portrayed Jane Seymour in the Broadway musical Six through January 2025. Forsberg joined the cast of Stephen Sondheim's Old Friends in Los Angeles before moving to its Broadway production in the spring of 2025.

== Early life ==
Forsberg grew up in Orlando, Florida, and was involved in the Orlando theater scene from a young age. She attended Timber Creek High School. Her mother is Filipino, while her father is white. She holds a BFA from Penn State University.

== Career ==
Before moving to the Broadway production, Forsberg played Jane Seymour in the first American national tour of Six, also known as the "Aragon tour." Her rendition of "Heart of Stone" is well-known for her usage of unique riffs and "opt-up" choices throughout the ballad. In April 2023, Forsberg and her fellow tour members performed on The Late Late Show with James Corden.

Forsberg made her Broadway debut in July 2023 as a cast member of Here Lies Love. In November 2023, she performed a solo show at 54 Below. From December 2023 until January 2025, she returned to her role of Jane Seymour in Six, this time as a replacement in the Broadway production.

In January 2024, Forsberg released the pop single "Halfway".

== Theatre roles ==
Year	Show	Role	Location	Type	Ref
2015	Carrie	Sue Snell	Clandestine Arts	Regional	
2016	The Fantasticks	Mute/Wall	Winter Park Playhouse	Regional	
2021	Wild Fire	The Kid	Denver Center	Regional	
2019	Broadway Bounty Hunter	Indigo	Greenwich House Theater	Off-Broadway	
2019	Love in Hate Nation	Rat	Two River Theater	Regional	
2021	A Grand Night for Singing		Goodspeed	Regional	
2022	Six	Jane Seymour	Various	"Aragon" American tour	
2023	Here Lies Love	Maria Luisa, Imelda's Inner Voice, Interviewer	Broadway Theatre	Broadway	
2023	Six	Jane Seymour	Lena Horne Theatre	Broadway	
2025	Stephen Sondheim's Old Friends	Performer	Ahmanson Theatre	Regional	
2025	Stephen Sondheim's Old Friends	Performer	Samuel J. Friedman Theatre	Broadway	
