= Didi Romero =

Puerto Rican actress

- Born: February 5, 1999 (age 27); Caguas, Puerto Rico
- Education: American Musical and Dramatic Academy
- Occupation: Actress
- Years active: 2019–present

Didi Romero (born February 5, 1999) is a Puerto Rican actress best known for portraying Katherine Howard in the Broadway production of SIX.

== Early life ==
Romero was born in Caguas, Puerto Rico and raised in Bayamón, Puerto Rico. Her mother is Deddie Romero, an actress and well-known public personality in Puerto Rico. Her grandparents were notable musicians Papá Candito and Sonia López.

In 2014, at age 14, Romero's made her professional stage debut in Puerto Rico, in a production of Construyendo a Verónica (Building Veronica) as the title character. The production was produced by Tantai Teatro in Puerto Rico. After finishing high school, Romero moved to the United States to attend the American Musical and Dramatic Academy (AMDA). While studying there, she was featured in the 2019 Broadway Rising Stars Showcase, featuring actress Ali Stroker, and graduated in 2019.

== Career ==
Romero played the role of Nina in In the Heights at the Westport Country Playhouse, a role she would reprise a year later at Broadway at Music Circus in Sacramento, California and the Coliseo de Puerto Rico. Her performance in each was widely regarded, with The New Haven Review praising her "delicate grace" and Davis Enterprise calling her performance a "tear-jerker."

Romero's was cast as Katherine Howard on the 2022 U.S. national tour of SIX. She assumed the role on Broadway in December 2023 and played her final performance on February 9, 2025.

In 2022, she made her screen debut in Mixtape (The Movie) as Karla. In 2023, Romero starred in Gina Yei, a Puerto Rican comedy-drama series on Disney+. Romero stars as Gina López, also known as Gina Yei, a talented songwriter pursuing her dreams while attending a prestigious school of reggateón.

In 2025, she returned to Puerto Rico to play the role of Sherrie in Rock of Ages at Centro de Bellas Artes Luis A. Ferré. The same year, she also reprised her role as Nina in In the Heights at Broadway at Music Circus and played Mimi in Rent at North Shore Music Theatre in Beverly, Massachusetts. She returned to Puerto Rico in 2026 in the role of Roxie Hart in Chicago at Centro de Bellas Artes de Caguas.

She will return to the stage in summer of 2026 in Jennifer Nettles' new musical, Giulia: The Poison Queen of Palermo as Duchessa. The production will premiere Off-Broadway at the Perelman Arts Center, starring Nettles in the title role.

== Filmography ==
=== TV and Film ===
Year	Title	Role	Notes	Ref.
2022	Mixtape (The Movie)	Karla	Feature film debut	
2023	Gina Yei	Gina López/Gina Yei	TV series	

=== Theatre ===
Year	Title	Role	Venue	Ref.
2014	Construyendo a Verónica	Verónica	Puerto Rico, produced by Tantai Teatro	
2019	In the Heights	Nina	Regional, Westport Country Playhouse	
2019	In the Heights	Nina	Sacramento, Broadway at Music Circus	
2021	In the Heights	Nina	Puerto Rico, Centro de Bellas Artes Luis A. Ferré	
2022	SIX	Catherine Howard	U.S. National Tour	
2023	SIX	Catherine Howard	Broadway, Lena Horne Theatre	
2025	Rock of Ages	Sherrie	Puerto Rico, Centro de Bellas Artes Luis A. Ferré	
2025	In the Heights	Nina	Sacramento, Broadway at Music Circus	
2025	Rent	Mimi Márquez	Regional, North Shore Music Theatre	
2026	Chicago	Roxie Hart	Puerto Rico, Centro de Bellas Artes de Caguas	
2026	Giulia: The Poison Queen of Palermo	Duchessa	Off-Broadway, Perelman Arts Center	
