= Abby Mueller =

American actress and singer

Abby Mueller is an American actress, singer, and performer who originated the role of Jane Seymour in the Broadway production of SIX. She is the sister of Jessie Mueller; both sisters played Carole King in Beautiful: The Carole King Musical.

== Early life ==
Mueller is originally from Chicago. Her father, Roger Mueller; mother, Jill Shellabarger, sister Jessie, and brothers Andrew and Matt also are performers. She attended Indiana University Bloomington where she studied acting.

== Career ==
Mueller made her Broadway debut in Kinky Boots, joining the cast in 2013 as a swing and understudy.

She joined the Broadway cast of Beautiful in 2014 and was announced as the lead of the 2015 national tour of the production. In August 2015, she performed with King on The Today Show.

In 2020, Mueller prepared to open the Broadway production of Six as Jane Seymour; the show was expected to open on March 12, 2020, but was delayed due to the COVID-19 pandemic.

It was supposed to be a celebratory week for the Mueller family: Abby Mueller’s sister Jessie was appearing on Broadway in The Minutes, while her brother Matt was finishing up his final week as Ron Weasley in Harry Potter and the Cursed Child. Instead of going out and celebrating, the Mueller family "came over to my house and we ate burgers and fries, and we had a nice little toast." It wasn’t what they planned but, “this is absolutely the right thing to do,” said the Six star and Broadway.com vlogger. "Yes, it's disappointing. Yes, it's inconvenient, but not in the big scope of things. We knew everybody else was in the same boat, everyone on Broadway—as well as the arts communities across the whole friggin' country. Everybody is bummed. And the most important thing is to all do the right thing and be safe and be healthy."

Mueller left her role in Six in August 2022. She performed in September 2022 as part of the Broadway and Vine concert series.

In 2024, Mueller performed at 54 Below. It was her New York City solo concert debut.
