= Jarnéia Richard-Noel =

English stage actress and singer

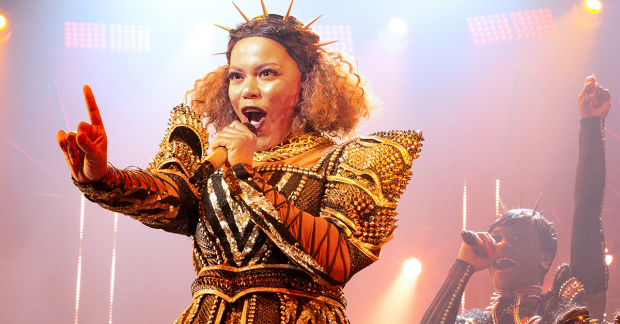
- Richard-Noel as Catherine of Aragon in the West End production of Six at the Arts Theatre
- Born: 12 June 1994 (age 32); Northampton, England
- Occupations: Actress; singer
- Years active: 2016–present
- Height: 170 cm (5 ft 7 in)

Jarnéia Richard-Noel (born 12 June 1994) is an English stage actress and singer. She is known for portraying the role of Catherine of Aragon in the musical SIX on the original UK tour and in the West End production at the Arts Theatre, Lyric Theatre and Vaudeville Theatre and in the show’s pro-shot SIX The Musical Live!, as well as forming part of pop girl group SVN.

== Early life ==
Richard-Noel grew up in Northampton, and has attended dance school since she was five and continued her love for arts into college. Richard-Noel then started training at the Urdang Academy in Islington, London for a National Diploma in Professional Musical Theatre in 2014 for three years until she graduated in 2017. She is also of Grenadian and Trinbagonian descent.

== Career ==
Prior to making her professional debut as a singer and dancer on board a P&O cruise, Richard-Noel performed in a number of productions whilst training at the Urdang Academy in Islington, London for a National Diploma in Professional Musical Theatre. She first starred in a theatrical production of Shakespeare Shorts at the Urdang Academy in 2016, and starred in subsequent productions held at the same venue, including Co-Equal, Spamalot, Carrie and Rent. Richard-Noel also starred in both a one-off concert titled 'Xmas Factor' for Iris Theatre in reference to The X Factor in 2016, and a concert rendition of The Color Purple as an ensemble member in 2017. She also was a dancer in an advert for Vanarama in 2018.

Richard-Noel has been a company member of SIX since 2018, playing the role of Catherine of Aragon. The production toured the UK before finally returning to the Arts Theatre, in the originally staged production (before it transferred to the new production at the Lyric Theatre). She received a Laurence Olivier Award for Best Actress in a Supporting Role in a Musical nomination alongside principal cast colleagues Millie O'Connell, Natalie Paris, Alexia McIntosh, Aimie Atkinson and Maiya Quansah-Breed in 2019. From 2019 to 2021 she worked alongside principal cast colleagues Courtney Bowman, Natalie Paris, Alexia McIntosh, Sophie Isaacs and Danielle Steers. Richard-Noel was also due to feature in a Live Drive-In UK Tour of SIX presented by Utilita Energy, in association with Live Nation. The performances were due to take place in compliance with the HM Government's COVID-19 social distancing measures at various venues across the UK. However, promoters Live Nation announced the cancellation of the tour due to fears over potential localised lockdowns in response to the ongoing coronavirus pandemic. Richard-Noel performed as part of the principal cast of Six at the Lyric Theatre, as one of the first musicals to return to the West End after the COVID-19 pandemic. From late September 2021, Richard-Noel moved to the nearby Vaudeville Theatre to complete her run in SIX until her final performance as Catherine of Aragon on 14 November 2021. However, she returned alongside the Original cast to perform at Hampton Court Palace in June 2022, before shortly returning to the Vaudeville Theatre where they featured in the show’s pro-shot named SIX The Musical Live!, which released in UK & Ireland cinemas on 6 April 2025. In July 2022, It was announced that Jarnéia would star in Elliot Clay's new musical Millennials until the end of its summer run at The Other Palace.

In September 2023, it was announced via WhatsOnStage that Richard-Noel would star as Gloria in the musical adaptation of the popular DreamWorks Animation film 'Madagascar The Musical' opening at Theatre Royal Plymouth and touring the UK and Ireland, with international stops in Monaco, Hong Kong and Singapore.

=== Theatre credits ===
Year	Production	Role	Venue	Ref
2016	Shakespeare Shorts	Helena	Urdang Academy	
2016	Co-Equal	Dancer	Urdang Academy	
2016	Spamalot	Lady of the Lake	Urdang Academy	
2016	Carrie	Miss Gardner	Urdang Academy	
2017	Rent	Joanne Jefferson	Urdang Academy	
2018 - 2021	SIX	Catherine of Aragon	UK Tour / Arts Theatre / Lyric Theatre / Vaudeville Theatre	
2021	Dick Whittington and His Cat	Alice Fitzwarren	Norwich Theatre Royal	
2022	Hairspray	Swing	Bromley, Cardiff, Poole, Edinburgh, Dartford & Glasgow	
2022	SIX	Catherine of Aragon	Hampton Court Palace / Vaudeville Theatre	
2022	Millennials	N/A	The Other Palace	
2022	Ghostlight	Miss Adelaide	Union Theatre	
2022 - 2023	Sleeping Beauty	Good Fairy	Theatre Royal Plymouth	
2023 - 2024	Madagascar The Musical	Gloria	International/UK Tour	
2025 - present	Sabrage	Performer	Lafayette, London	

=== SVN ===
Richard-Noel also forms a part of the pop girl group SVN (pronounced 'seven') alongside five former West End cast members of SIX: Millie O'Connell, Natalie May Paris, Alexia McIntosh, Aimie Atkinson and Maiya Quansah-Breed, plus Grace Mouat, the former swing of the original cast of SIX. After a limited series of concerts in October 2020, their debut concert was rescheduled from February 2022 to 7 August 2022 at the O2 Academy Islington, with the group releasing singles such as "Stars" and "Free" in 2022.

==== Discography ====
Year	Title	Artist	Ref
2021	"Queen"	SVN	
2021	"Stars"	SVN	
2022	"Woman"	SVN	
2022	"Free"	SVN	
2022	"Boss"	SVN	

==== Concerts ====
Year	Production	Date	Venue	Ref
2020	The Reunion	10-11 October 2020	Oval Space, Bethnal Green, London	
2022	SVN	7 August 2022	O2 Academy Islington	

== Filmography ==
=== Film ===
Year	Title	Role	Distributor	Ref
2024	Wicked (2024 film)	Chorus	Universal Pictures	
2025	SIX The Musical Live!	Catherine of Aragon	Universal Pictures	

=== Television ===
Year	Title	Role	Broadcasting Channel	Ref
2018	This Morning	Catherine of Aragon	ITV	
2019	The One Show	Catherine of Aragon	BBC One	
2019	Olivier Awards	Catherine of Aragon	ITV	
2020	This Morning	Catherine of Aragon	ITV	
2021	Musicals: The Greatest Show	Catherine of Aragon	BBC One	
2021	This Morning	Catherine of Aragon	ITV	
2022	This Morning	Themself	ITV	

=== Radio ===
Year	Title	Role	Radio Station	Ref
2020	WhatsOnStage Awards 2020 with Elaine Paige and Paddy O’Connell	Herself	BBC Radio 2	
2020	Magic With The Musicals LIVE	Catherine of Aragon	Magic FM	
2021	Musicals: The Greatest Show	Catherine of Aragon	BBC Radio 2	
