= Andrea Macasaet =

Canadian actress and singer

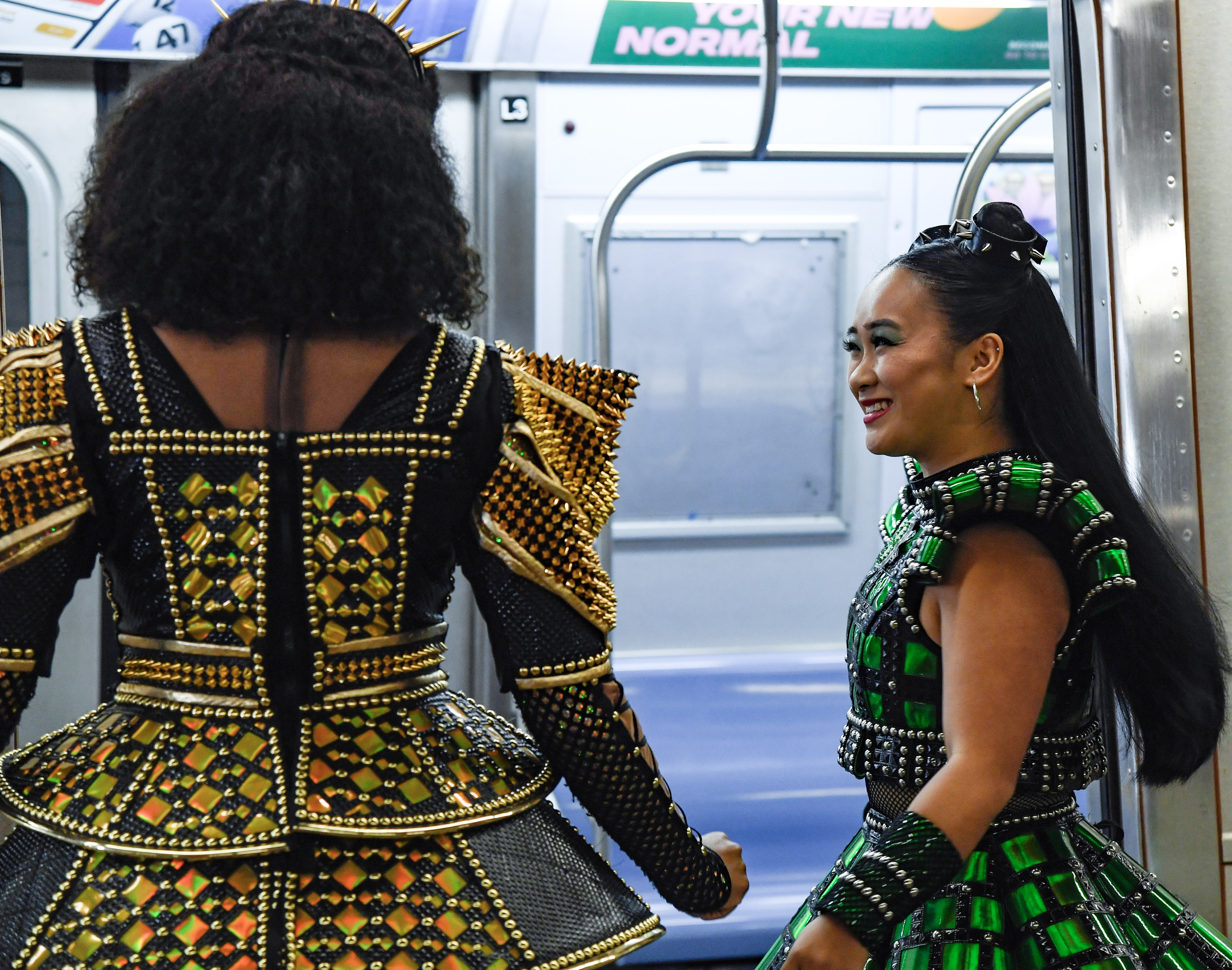
- Macasaet (right) with fellow actress Adrianna Hicks (left) in New York City in 2021.
- Born: Andrea Cesyl Macasaet; March 13, 1994 (age 32); Winnipeg, Manitoba, Canada
- Education: The Canadian College of Performing Arts
- Occupations: Actress, singer

Andrea Cesyl Macasaet (/mæˈkəˈsɛt/; born March 13, 1994) is a Canadian actress and singer. She is best known for originating the role of Anne Boleyn in the Broadway production of Six: The Musical.

== Early life ==
Macasaet was born in Winnipeg, Manitoba. She is of Filipina descent, with both of her parents immigrants to Canada from the Philippines. She first developed an interest in musical theatre as a child, where she grew up singing karaoke with her family. She was cast in local youth productions of The King and I and Beauty and the Beast.

She attended the Canadian College of Performing Arts, from which she graduated in 2013. After she experienced difficulty landing roles, Macasaet enrolled in the human resources program at the University of Winnipeg in 2018.

== Career ==
In 2015, Macasaet participated in the Canadian tour of Bubble Guppies: Ready to Rock!, a live concert tour based on the children's television series.

Macasaet's first major role was in Miss Saigon, where she starred as Kim in the regional production by the Victoria Operatic Society. After this, she experienced difficulty being seriously considered for roles and decided to return to studying human resources.

In 2018, Macasaet attended an open casting call for Six: The Musical, where she was considered for the roles of Anne Boleyn and Jane Seymour. Macasaet was cast as Anne Boleyn, which she performed on the North American pre-Broadway tour. The pre-Broadway tour began at the Chicago Shakespeare Theater in May 2019, before also playing at the American Repertory Theater in Cambridge, the Citadel Theatre in Edmonton, and the Ordway Center for the Performing Arts in Minnesota.

Macasaet was about to make her Broadway debut when Six: The Musical was about to premiere at the Brooks Atkinson Theatre on March 13, 2020. However, earlier that day, all Broadway productions were suspended due to the COVID-19 pandemic. The musical eventually opened on September 17, 2021, with Macasaet making her Broadway debut. Macasaet appeared on the live cast album recorded on opening night. Macasaet left the show on December 4, 2022.

In 2023, it was announced that Macasaet would make her debut at the Stratford Festival, starring as Mimi Márquez in Rent.

In 2024, Macasaet starred in the world premiere of Ma Buhay, an all-Filipino musical that premiered at the Rainbow Stage in Winnipeg. The musical opened on June 27, 2024, and closed on July 14, 2024.

== Credits ==
=== Stage ===
Year	Production	Role	Theatre	Category
2010	25th Annual Putnam Country Spelling Bee	Marcy Park	Winnipeg Studio Theatre	Regional
2013	Miss Saigon	Kim	Victoria Operatic Society	Regional
2014	Avenue Q	Christmas Eve	Winnipeg Studio Theatre	Regional
2015	Bubble Guppies: Ready to Rock!	Nonny	Canadian Tour	
2016	Heathers: The Musical	Heather Duke	Winnipeg Studio Theatre	Regional
2018	Prairie Nurse	Indepenica "Penny" Uy	Station Arts Centre	Regional
2019	Six: The Musical	Anne Boleyn	Chicago Shakespeare Theater	Pre-Broadway engagement tour
2019	Six: The Musical	Anne Boleyn	American Repertory Theater	Pre-Broadway engagement tour
2019	Six: The Musical	Anne Boleyn	Citadel Theatre	Pre-Broadway engagement tour
2019	Six: The Musical	Anne Boleyn	Ordway Center for the Performing Arts	Pre-Broadway engagement tour
2021	Ratatouille the Musical	Rat Queen	Online benefit concert	
2021-2022	Six: The Musical	Anne Boleyn	Brooks Atkinson Theatre	Broadway
2023	Rent	Mimi Márquez	Festival Theatre	Stratford Festival
2024	Ma Buhay	Celina	Rainbow Stage	Regional, World premiere

=== Film ===
Year	Title	Role	Notes
2020	I Propose We Never See Each Other Again After Tonight	Agnes DelaCruz	
