= Maiya Quansah-Breed =

British actress

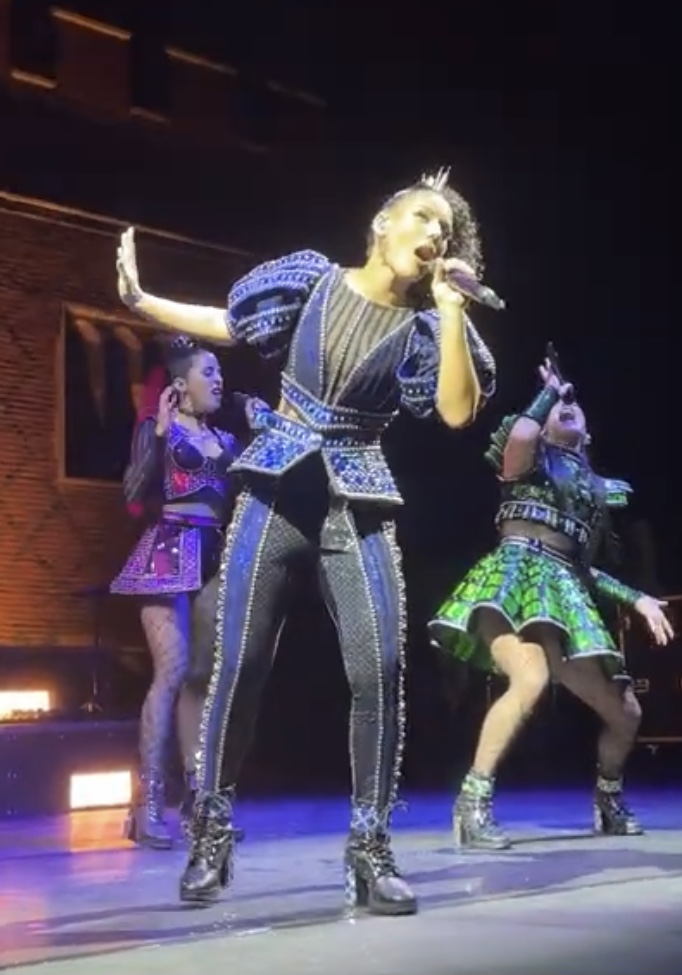
- Quansah-Breed performing at Hampton Court Palace in 2022
- Born: Maiya Jasmin Esi Quansah-Breed; 6 July 1997 (age 29); Eccles, Greater Manchester, England
- Education: Guildford School of Acting
- Occupations: Singer; actress
- Years active: 2018-present

Maiya Jasmin Esi Quansah-Breed (born 6 July 1997) is an English singer and stage actress. She is best known for playing Catherine Parr in the UK tour and original cast of the musical SIX, a role that granted her and her fellow castmates an Olivier Award nomination for Best Actress in a Supporting Role in a Musical in 2019.

== Early life and education ==
Maiya Jasmin Esi Quansah-Breed was born in Eccles to parents David Breed and Amanda Quansah and grew up in Glossop. Quansah-Breed attended Longdendale High School in Hollingworth and then Pendleton College, studying musical theatre. She trained in musical theatre at Guildford School of Acting, graduating in 2018 with fellow Six cast member Grace Mouat.

== Career ==
=== Musical theatre ===
Quansah-Breed made her professional debut joining the cast of SIX in 2018 for the UK tour production, which then moved permanently to the Arts Theatre in London. She was nominated for the Black British Theatre Awards in 2020 for her portrayal of Catherine Parr in the musical. Quansah-Breed returned to the show a few times as emergency cover for Catherine Parr both in the UK tour and West End production. She also returned to the role in June 2022, with the original cast of the show, for three concerts at Hampton Court Palace.

In 2020 she starred in Dominic Powell's Cases, transferring at The Other Palace after a successful run at the Phoenix Theatre. The cast also featured Sabrina Aloueche, Andrew Patrick-Walker, and Adrian Hansel. Quansah-Breed was also part of the album recording of the show in 2021.

In the same year she took part in the workshop of the coming-of-age musical thriller Game Theory, developed by UK theatre company Perfect Pitch and directed by Julie Atherton.

Quansah-Breed took the role of Mimi Marquez in the Hope Mill Theatre production of RENT, which was due to open in 2020, but only ran five performances before a new UK COVID-19 lockdown. The production was directed by Luke Sheppard and starred Millie O'Connell as Maureen, Jocasta Almgill as Joanne, Blake Patrick Anderson as Mark, Tom Francis as Roger, Ahmed Hamad as Benny, Dom Hartley-Harris as Collins, and Alex Thomas-Smith as Angel. The show was streamed online during the lockdown and returned at the Hope Mill for a short engagement in 2021. The cast of this second run was mostly the same with Luke Bayer covering the role of Mark and Michael Ahomka-Lindsay playing Benny.

In December 2021, she took part as Lady McDuff in the workshop of the new musical Lady M, with other cast members including, Kerry Ellis as Lady Macbeth, Karl Queensborough as Macbeth, Jamie Muscato as Banquo and George Blagden as McDuff.

In 2023 Quansah-Breed returned in the role of Philoclea to the Hope Mill Theatre for their production of the musical Head Over Heels playing from January to March. The Go-Go's jukebox show made its UK debut in the venue in Manchester.

On 14 June 2023 it was announced that Quansah-Breed would be playing 19-year-old Diana Spencer in a new concert version of the musical Diana, playing at the Eventim Apollo on 4 December 2023. In this version of the show the lead role was split between two actresses, with Kerry Ellis playing Diana, Princess of Wales. Denise Welch also guest starred as Queen Elizabeth.

From January to February 2024 Quansah-Breed was part of the cast of Rehab: The New Musical, as Lucy Blake.

=== Music ===
Quansah-Breed is part of the all-female group SVN, together with original SIX cast members Jarnéia Richard-Noel (Jaye’J), Millie O’Connell, Natalie Paris, Alexia McIntosh (Lexi), Aimie Atkinson, and Grace Mouat. The idea for the group was suggested by McIntosh when Six opened in Edinburgh in 2018.

In 2021 SVN released their first original song, 'Stars', with their second single, 'Woman', announced on 28 April 2022 and focusing on female empowerment.

==== Discography ====
Year	Title	Artist	Album	Ref
2021	"Queen"	SVN	TBA	
2021	"Stars"	SVN	TBA	
2022	"Woman"	SVN	TBA	
2022	"Free"	SVN	TBA	
2022	"Boss"	SVN	TBA	

== Personal life ==
Quansah-Breed is vegan.

== Theatre credits ==
Year	Title	Role	Theatre
2018-2019	SIX	Catherine Parr	UK Tour, Arts Theatre, Hampton Court Palace
2020	Cases	Sophia	The Other Palace
2021	RENT	Mimi Marquez	Hope Mill Theatre
2021	The Distance You Have Come	Laura	Apollo Theatre
2022	The Secret Garden	Martha Sowerby	London Palladium
2023	Head Over Heels	Philoclea	Hope Mill Theatre
2023	Lizzie	Alice Russell	Hope Mill Theatre
2023	Diana	Young Diana Spencer	Eventim Apollo
2024	Rehab: The New Musical	Lucy Blake	Neon 194
2024	Pop Off, Michelangelo!	Mother	The Other Palace

== Awards and nominations ==
Year	Work	Award	Category	Result
2019	-	Black British Theatre Awards	Best Recent Graduate Award	Nominated
2019	SIX	Olivier Awards	Best Actress in a Supporting Role in a Musical	Nominated
2020	SIX	Black British Theatre Awards	Best Female Actor in a Musical	Nominated
