= Barnwell School =

Location
- Barnwell; Stevenage, Hertfordshire, SG2 9SW; England; 51°53′23″N 0°10′23″W

Information
- Type: Foundation school
- Established: 1959
- Local authority: Hertfordshire
- Department for Education URN: 117518 Tables
- Ofsted: Reports
- Headteacher: Maria Townsend
- Gender: Coeducational
- Age: 11 to 18
- Enrolment: 1045
- Website: www.barnwellschool.co.uk

Barnwell School is a coeducational secondary school and sixth form established in 1959 and in the south of Stevenage, Hertfordshire.

Between 2002 and 2005 it was the most improved school in Hertfordshire and one of the most improved schools in England. The overall pass rate this year is 48 per cent for grades A to C — a one per cent increase on year before, but still below the national average by far.

In September 2006 the school expanded by taking in the students from another nearby school that closed (Collenswood). As a consequence, the school now has two campuses: Barnwell Upper Campus (the original Barnwell site) and, less than a mile away, Barnwell Middle Campus (formerly the site of Heathcote School).

The school was designated as a Business and Enterprise College in September 2004 due to having an emphasis on maths, business and IT.

== Extended schools ==
Barnwell School has been designated the hub school for South Stevenage Consortium of Extended Schools. The consortium consists of 8 schools plus a federation:

- Barnwell School
- Peartree Spring Junior School
- Peartree Spring Infant School
- Peartree Way Nursery School
- Featherstone Wood Primary School
- Roebuck Academy
- St Margaret's Primary School
- Shephalbury Meadow Federation (Longmeadow Primary School & Shephalbury Primary School)
