= Six (musical) =

British musical comedy

- 2019 production poster
- Music: Toby Marlow; Lucy Moss
- Lyrics: Toby Marlow; Lucy Moss
- Book: Toby Marlow; Lucy Moss
- Premiere: 2017: Edinburgh Festival Fringe
- Productions: 2017 Edinburgh; 2017 West End; 2018 UK tour; 2019 West End; 2019 North American tour; 2019 UK tour; 2021 Broadway; 2022 North American tour; 2022 North American tour
- Awards: Tony Award for Best Original Score

Six (stylised SIX in all caps) is a British musical with music, book, and lyrics by Toby Marlow and Lucy Moss. It is a modern retelling of the lives of the six wives of Henry VIII, presented in the form of a singing competition and pop concert. In the show, the wives take turns telling their stories to determine who suffered the most from their shared husband, but ultimately seek to reclaim their individual identities and rewrite their stories.

The musical premiered at the Edinburgh Festival Fringe in 2017, where it was performed by students from Cambridge University. Six premiered in the West End at the Arts Theatre in January 2019, and has since embarked on a UK tour. It premiered in North America in May 2019 and on Broadway in February 2020. Following a hiatus due to the COVID-19 pandemic, it officially opened at the Brooks Atkinson Theatre on 3 October 2021 and has since launched additional touring companies.

A filmed stage production titled SIX The Musical Live!, featuring the original West End cast, was released in UK & Ireland cinemas by Universal Pictures on 6 April 2025. It was released in theaters in the US and Canada on 14 August 2026.

== Plot ==
The six queens consort introduce themselves through biographical pop songs and explain that their band's lead singer will be whoever they determine had the worst experience at the hands of their shared ex-husband, Henry VIII ("Ex-Wives"). Catherine of Aragon recounts how Henry wished to annul their marriage and place her in a nunnery when he began pursuing Anne Boleyn, despite her loyalty to him ("No Way"). The queens introduce Anne Boleyn ("The One You've Been Waiting For"), who boasts about how Henry wanted her instead of Catherine, but then complains of Henry's infidelity, which led to Anne's own flirtations with other men, which were the grounds for her beheading ("Don't Lose Ur Head"). Jane Seymour steps up to take her turn, but is ridiculed for having had an easy time with Henry. However, while admitting she may have been the only wife Henry truly loved, Jane claims that Henry's love was conditional, only guaranteed because she produced a male heir, and that she stood by him despite his many faults ("Heart of Stone").

Themes relating to ideas of female beauty and the sacrifices expected are explored in Hans Holbein's portrait studio. The queens parody a dating app by presenting a choice of potential brides ("Haus of Holbein"). Henry chooses Anna of Cleves (Note: In the musical, the character Anna of Cleves goes by the German spelling "Anna" instead of the traditionally anglicised "Anne". This distinguishing spelling leaves "Anne" for Anne Boleyn.) for his fourth wife, but soon rejects her and annuls the marriage, claiming she failed to resemble her "profile picture". She makes a show of complaining about living in a palace in Richmond with an enormous fortune and no husband telling her what to do but ends up bragging about her life instead ("Get Down"). The other queens question this, and Anna admits her lavish lifestyle lacked actual tragedy then drops out of the competition. The queens next mock Katherine Howard (Note: The character Katherine Howard is spelled with a 'K', though the historical figure is sometimes spelled Catherine. This distinguishing spelling leaves "Catherine" maintained for the two other wives with that name.) claiming she is "the least relevant Catherine," but in retaliation she exposes flaws in the others' claims to winning. Katherine recounts her romantic history, having had many suitors even as a child, and at first relishes her attractiveness before later revealing the emotional trauma and sexual abuse she faced in each of these relationships ("All You Wanna Do").

As the queens continue to fight over who the true winner is, the final wife, Catherine Parr, questions the point of the competition, which defines them by their connection to Henry rather than as individuals. They nonetheless continue to argue. Frustrated, Parr details her separation from her lover, Sir Thomas Seymour, and arranged marriage to Henry; however, instead of simply complaining about her situation, she acknowledges her accomplishments independent of Henry ("I Don't Need Your Love"). The other queens, realizing they have been robbed of their individuality, abandon the contest and declare that they do not need Henry's love to feel validated as people ("I Don't Need Your Love (Remix)"). They use their remaining moments onstage to rewrite their stories, singing together as a group rather than as solo artists, and writing their own 'happily ever afters', imagining that Henry had never married them ("Six"). They then perform a mashup of the main songs that appeared earlier in the show ("The Megasix").

== Development ==
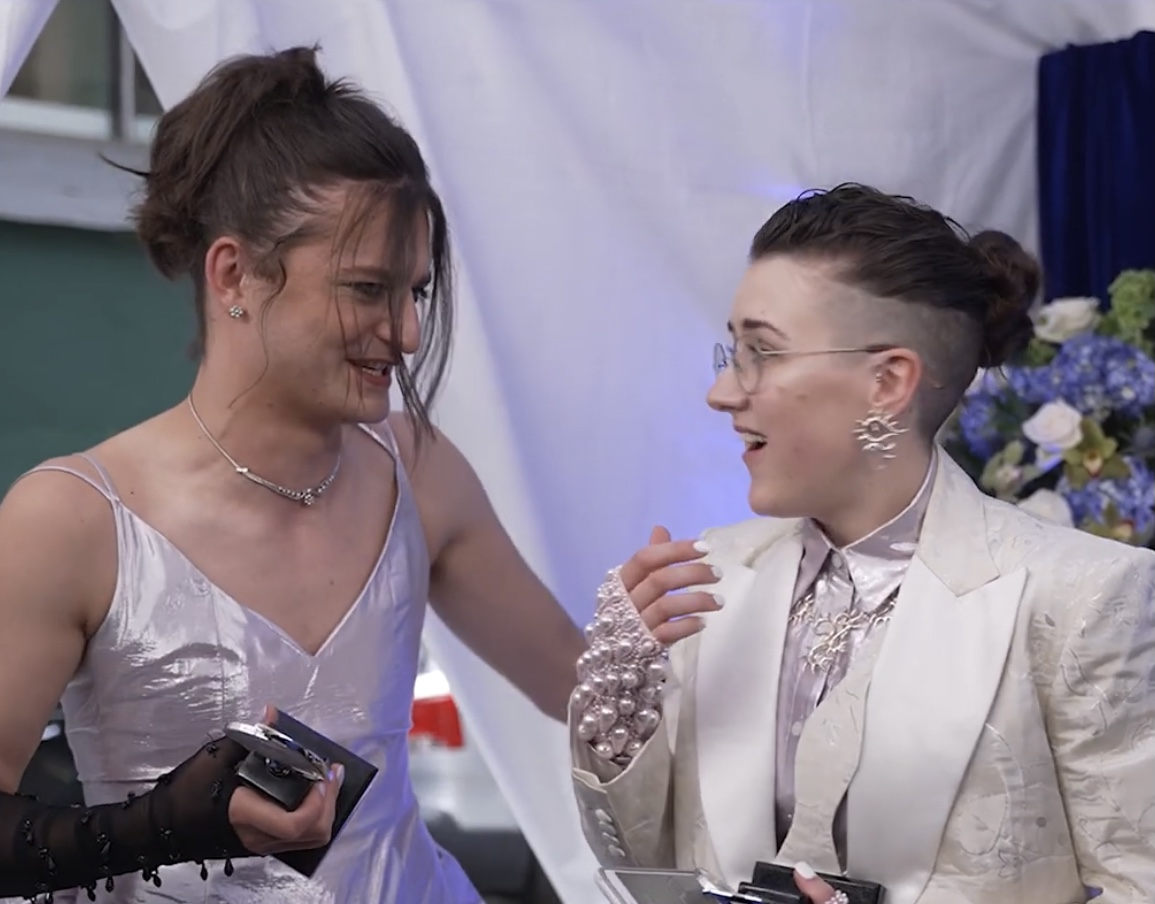
Marlow (left) and Moss (right) at the 75th Tony Awards.

In late 2016, Toby Marlow was selected by the Cambridge University Musical Theatre Society to create and write a new musical that would be presented at the Edinburgh Festival Fringe in 2017. Marlow, who was in their final year at Cambridge University, created a concept for a musical that would involve re-telling the story of King Henry VIII's ex-wives. They partnered with another student, Lucy Moss, who began working on a concept for the musical together.

In the beginning, Six was not intended to focus on the story specifically of Tudor period wives of Henry the Eighth. What interested Marlow and Moss more was the representation of women in musical theatre culture. They were mainly interested in shaping and reforming how women are viewed, just like the very characters featured in Six.

As they began working on the musical, Marlow researched the ex-wives stories by reading Antonia Fraser's The Six Wives of Henry VIII, while Moss viewed a documentary series, Six Wives by Lucy Worsley. They also watched and drew inspiration from the 2011 Beyoncé concert and story-telling performance, Live at Roseland: Elements of 4. The foundation for the musical was written over the course of approximately 10 nonconsecutive days.

In developing the characters, Marlow and Moss were inspired by several real-life pop stars who were used as a composite and musical inspiration for the characters. The six ex-wives and their corresponding pop star inspirations are:

- Catherine of Aragon: modelled on Beyoncé and Jennifer Hudson
- Anne Boleyn: modelled on Avril Lavigne and Lily Allen
- Jane Seymour: modelled on Adele, Sia, and Celine Dion.
- Anna of Cleves: modelled on Nicki Minaj and Rihanna.
- Katherine Howard: modelled on Britney Spears and Ariana Grande.
- Catherine Parr: modelled on Alicia Keys and Emeli Sandé.

== Production history ==
=== Edinburgh Festival Fringe (2017) ===
The first preview performance of Six took place at the ADC Theatre on 31 July 2017, before then debuting at the Edinburgh Festival Fringe, in a presentation by the Cambridge University Musical Theatre Society. The musical ran from 3 to 27 August, 2017. The cast consisted primarily of students from Cambridge University. Megan Gilbert originated the role of Catherine of Aragon, Ash Weir originated Anne Boleyn. Holly Musgrave originated the role of Jane Seymour and Oliver Wickham not only originated, but was the first non-binary cast member to play Anna of Cleves. Katherine Howard was modelled after Toby Marlow's sister Annabel Marlow, who originated the role. Shimali De Silva originated the role of Catherine Parr; she was also the first South Asian cast member to play Catherine Parr. The production's run was sold-out, and led to the musical being invited to return to the Edinburgh Festival Fringe in 2018. Although the show did not win any major awards at the Fringe, it received positive reviews and buzz, and expressions of commercial interest.

=== West End (2017) ===
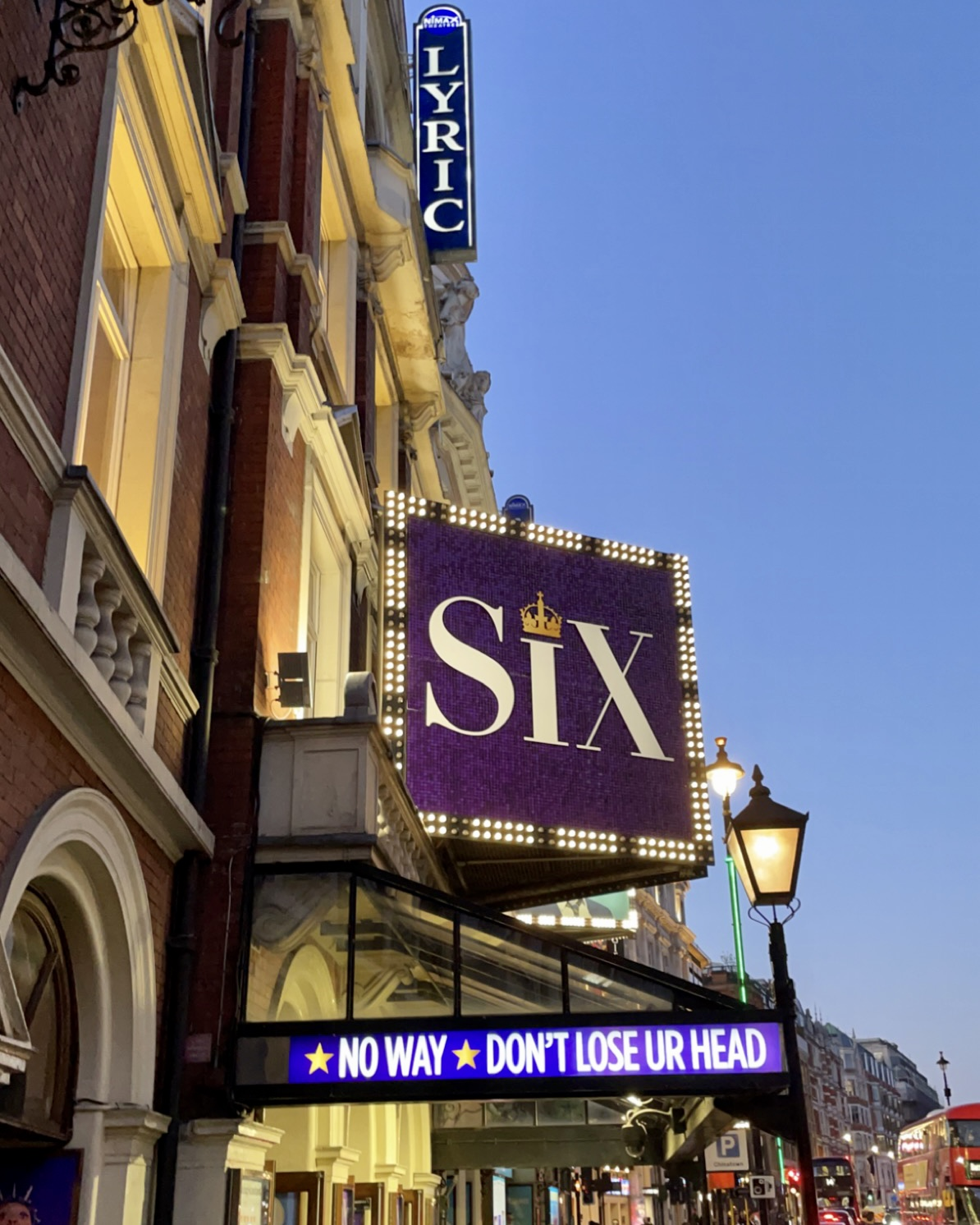
Branding as seen on the Lyric Theatre in London in 2020.

Following the success of the Edinburgh Festival Fringe production, Marlow and Moss brought Six back to Cambridge, where it attracted the attention of producer Kenny Wax, who went on to partner with George Stiles and Wendy and Andy Barnes, to produce the show. Six had its first professional production at the Arts Theatre in London's West End, for six Monday night performances beginning on 18 December 2017. The cast included Renée Lamb as Catherine of Aragon, Christina Modestou as Anne Boleyn, Natalie Paris as Jane Seymour, Genesis Lynea as Anna of Cleves, Aimie Atkinson as Katherine Howard, and Izuka Hoyle as Catherine Parr.

=== UK tour (2018) ===
Six embarked on a brief tour across the UK between 11 July 2018 and 30 December 2018. Paris and Atkinson reprised their roles as Jane Seymour and Katherine Howard, respectively, with Jarnéia Richard-Noel, Millie O'Connell, Alexia McIntosh, and Maiya Quansah-Breed joining the cast. The tour included performances at the Norwich Playhouse, and return engagements at the Edinburgh Festival Fringe and the Arts Theatre in London.

=== West End (2019–present) ===
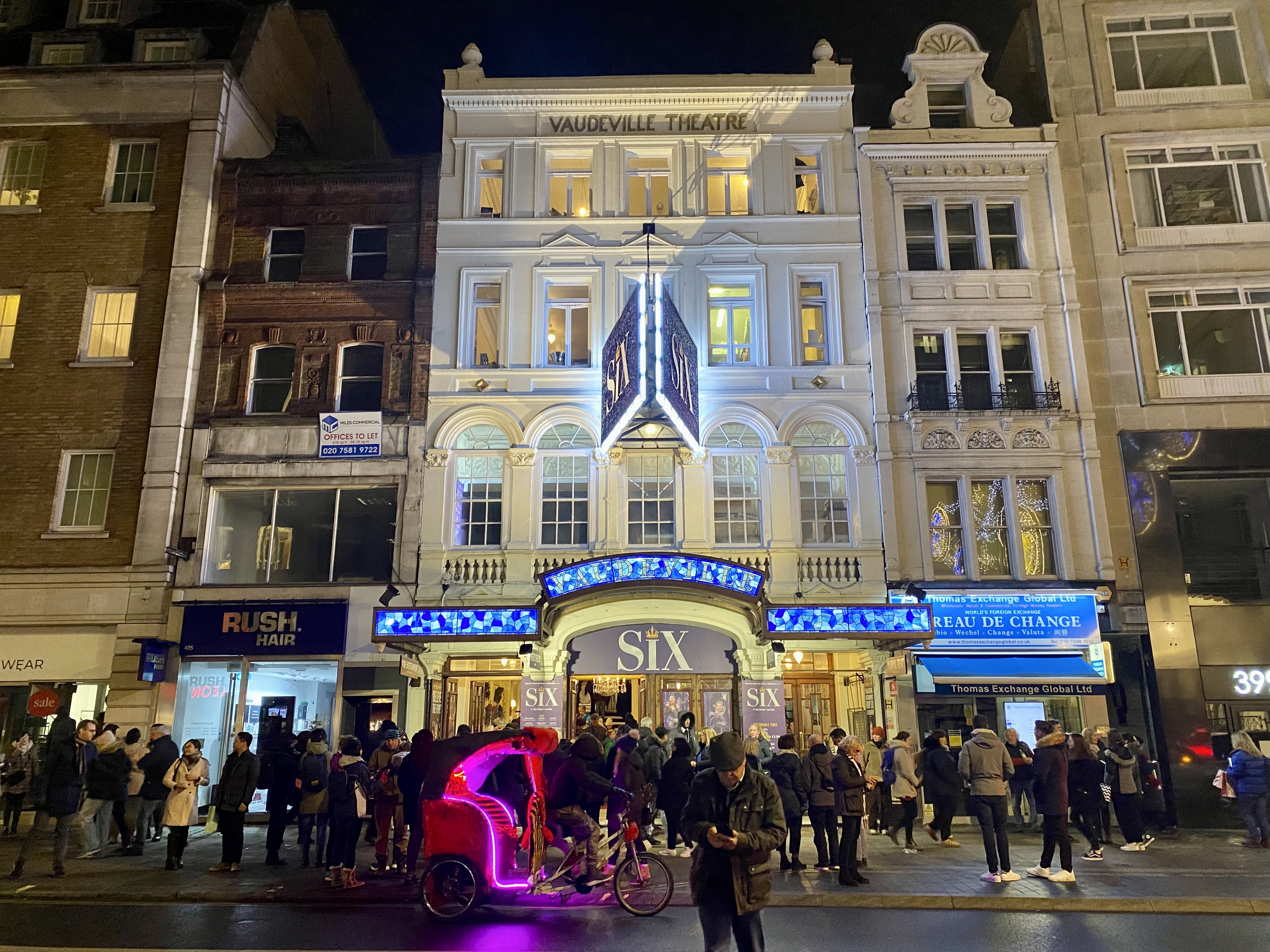
Six at the Vaudeville Theatre, December 2022

Six officially made its West End open-ended-run premiere at the Arts Theatre on 17 January 2019. All of the cast members from the 2018 touring production reprised their roles in the original West End production, which was directed by Lucy Moss and Jamie Armitage. Performances were suspended in March 2020, because of the COVID-19 pandemic.

On 5 December 2020, Six resumed performances, this time playing at the Lyric Theatre. Despite the COVID-19 preventative measures implemented in London theatres, performances were once again forced to stop on 14 December 2020.

On 21 May 2021, Six reopened for a second time at the Lyric Theatre. The musical finished its residency at the Lyric Theatre on 29 August 2021. It then transferred West End theatres and reopened at the Vaudeville Theatre on 29 September 2021.

In April 2025, a production of Six starring the original West End cast was shown for a limited time in cinemas across the UK and Ireland. The production was filmed in June 2022 live from the Vaudeville Theatre.

=== Pre-Broadway tour (2019) ===
Six made its North American premiere at the Chicago Shakespeare Theater in May 2019, as a "likely Broadway tryout". The cast included Adrianna Hicks as Catherine of Aragon, Andrea Macasaet as Anne Boleyn, Abby Mueller as Jane Seymour, Brittney Mack as Anne of Cleves, Samantha Pauly as Katherine Howard, and Anna Uzele as Catherine Parr. The production opened on 14 May 2019, played for an extended run and broke box office records. It was announced in August 2019 that the production would tour and transfer to Broadway. In late August 2019, the tour moved to the American Repertory Theater in Cambridge, Massachusetts. It made its Canadian premiere at Edmonton's Citadel Theatre in November 2019. A final performance series was given at the Ordway Center for the Performing Arts in St. Paul, Minnesota.

=== Norwegian Cruise Line productions (2019–2024) ===
Six was performed on Norwegian Cruise Line ships beginning in September 2019 on the Norwegian Bliss, with a second production beginning in November 2019 on the Norwegian Breakaway. The Productions were paused in March 2020 due to the COVID-19 pandemic. Performances resumed in September 2021 on the Norwegian Breakaway and in October 2021 on the Norwegian Bliss. The productions of Six the Musical on Norwegian Cruise Line ships ended on January 26, 2024, on the Norwegian Breakaway, and on February 24, 2024, on the Norwegian Bliss.

=== UK and international tour (2019–present) ===
The cast for the first UK long-running tour included Lauren Drew as Catherine of Aragon, Maddison Bulleyment as Anne Boleyn, Lauren Byrne as Jane Seymour, Shekinah McFarlane as Anna of Cleves, Jodie Steele as Katherine Howard, and Athena Collins as Catherine Parr. The tour opened on 24 October 2019 at the Yvonne Arnaud Theatre in Guildford. It was suspended in March 2020 due to the COVID-19 pandemic. Amidst the pandemic, plans emerged for a drive-in style tour across the UK beginning in June 2020. However, those plans were cancelled due to further COVID-19 shutdown restrictions. On 8 June 2021, the UK tour resumed, with performances beginning in Canterbury. The tour expanded into an international tour in 2023, featuring international stops interspersed with performances on the UK tour. To date, the tour has visited South Korea, the Netherlands, Germany, Switzerland, Italy, the Philippines, Singapore, Japan, Spain and China, with multiple return engagements in certain countries.

=== Australia (2020–2023; 2024–2025; 2026–present) ===
Six had its Australian premiere at the Sydney Opera House in January 2020 starring Chloé Zuel (Aragon), Kala Gare (Boleyn), Loren Hunter (Seymour), Kiana Daniele (Cleves), Courtney Monsma (Howard), and Vidya Makan (Parr). The production was originally planned to tour to Melbourne's Comedy Theatre in mid 2020 and Adelaide's Her Majesty's Theatre in late 2020 as part of the Adelaide Cabaret Festival but the performances were postponed due to the COVID-19 pandemic. The Australian production is produced by Louise Withers, Michael Coppel and Linda Bewick. The production reopened on 19 December 2021, at the Sydney Opera House and ran through to 2 April 2022. Gare, Hunter, Daniele, Makan, Oka and Quan returned to the show, and joined by Phoenix Jackson Mendoza and Chelsea Dawson, replacing Zuel and Monsma as Aragon and Howard respectively. It then continued its Australian tour in Canberra, with stops in Adelaide and Melbourne, before returning to Sydney again, with Perth and Brisbane to follow. The show closed in February 2023 after its last run in Brisbane, with all cast members departing. On 28 November 2023, it was announced that Six would be returning to Australia for another tour starting from August 2024 in Melbourne and then going to Sydney from October 2024 and Brisbane from January 2025. The cast consisted of new members such as Kimberley Hodgeson as Aragon, Deirdre Khoo as Boleyn, Zelia Rose Kitoko as Cleves and Giorgia Kennedy as Parr, with Hunter and Dawson returning as Seymour and Howard respectively. The tour closed on May 5 2025.

On December 1 2025, It was announced that Six would be returning in July of 2026 in Melbourne, Sydney and Brisbane. On April 28 the cast was announced, the upcoming cast includes Sarah Murr as Aragon, Mia Paris Scalise as Boleyn, Cara Bessey as Seymour, Kadesa Honeyhill as Cleves, Angela Brischetto as Howard and Lorinda May Merrypor as Parr.

=== Broadway (2021–2027) ===
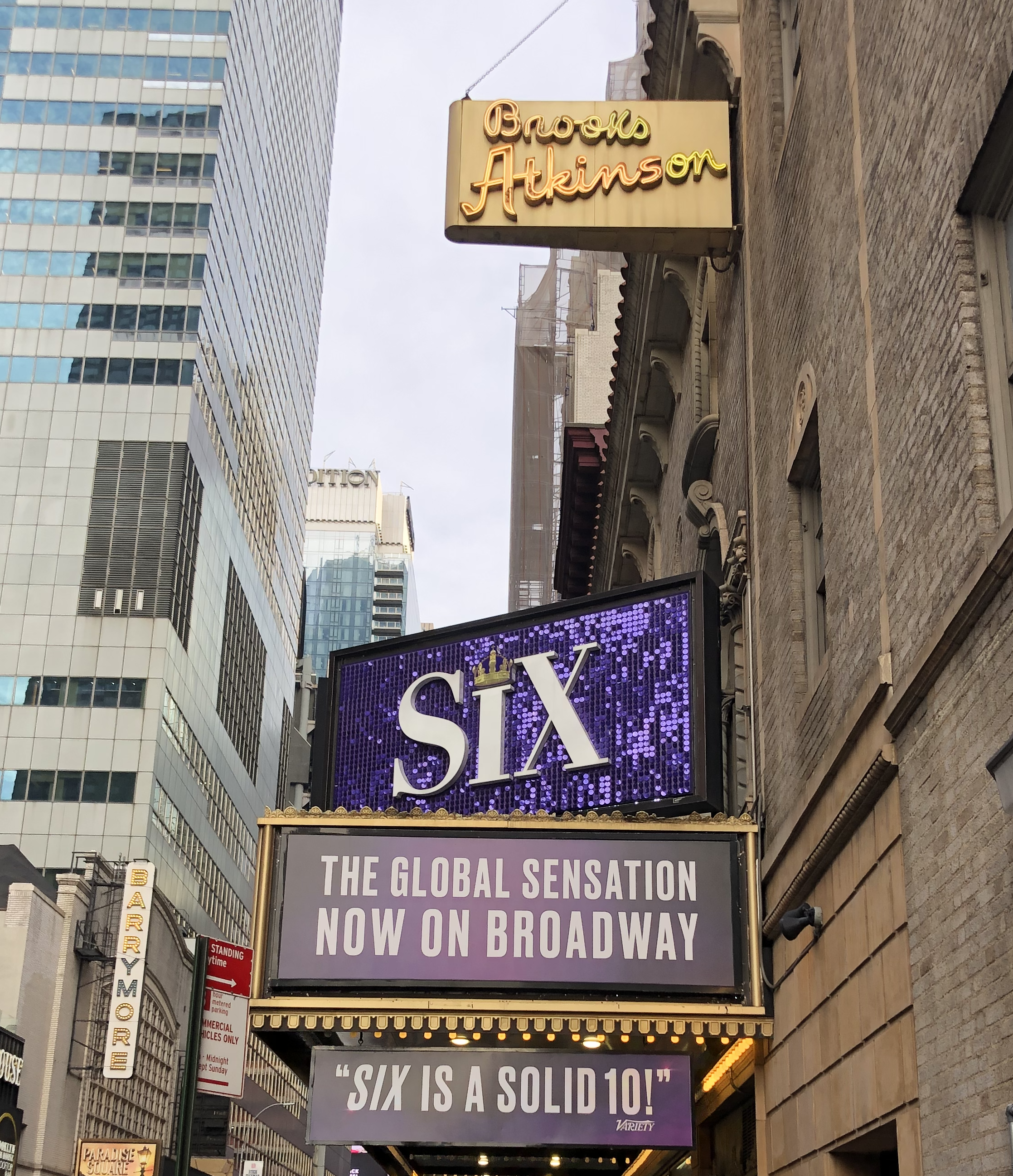
Six at the Lena Horne Theatre (formerly Brooks Atkinson Theatre), May 2022

Six began Broadway previews on 13 February 2020 at the Lena Horne Theatre (then known as the Brooks Atkinson Theatre). On the day of its scheduled Broadway opening, 12 March 2020, all Broadway theatres were closed due to the COVID-19 pandemic. Six resumed Broadway previews on 17 September 2021, and it opened officially on 3 October. The first new musical to open on Broadway since the beginning of the pandemic, according to Variety, its opening night was a celebration for Broadway theatre. Moss and Armitage directed the production, with choreography by Carrie-Anne Ingrouille, set design by Emma Bailey, costumes by Gabriella Slade and lighting by Tim Deiling. The original Broadway cast was the same as the 2019 North American tour cast. To promote the show, the cast performed at the 2021 Macy's Thanksgiving Day Parade.

A cast album of the Broadway production was released. The live recording from the opening night was released 6 May 2022.

In January 2026 it was announced that TikTok influencer, Dylan Mulvaney had been cast in the role of Anne Boleyn. The announcement was subject to a significant backlash from right wing and gender-critical accounts on social media, which resulted in the musical's X account being locked to non-followers and comments being turned off on its Instagram post announcing the casting. Mulvaney vacated the role in May 2026.

Two of the original West End queens, Natalie Paris and Aimie Atkinson, joined the Broadway cast in their original roles on 17 August 2026. Paris will stay in the role until December 2026, while Atkinson will leave on 31 October 2026. In August 2026, it was also announced that the production will close on January 3, 2027.

=== North American touring productions (2022–2023; 2022–present) ===
A US national tour of Six was planned to begin at Chicago's Broadway Playhouse, but was delayed because of the COVID-19 pandemic. The tour, later dubbed the "Aragon" tour, began performances at the CIBC Theatre in Chicago on 29 March 2022. The cast was Khaila Wilcoxon as Aragon, Storm Lever as Boleyn, Jasmine Forsberg as Seymour, Olivia Donalson as Cleves, Didi Romero as Howard and Gabriela Carrillo as Parr. The West End Seymour, Natalie Paris, joined the tour, reprising her role, in 2023. The tour ended in July 2023, and the original tour cast moved to the ongoing Broadway production in December 2023.

A second overlapping US national tour, dubbed the "Boleyn" tour began performances at The Smith Center in Las Vegas, Nevada, on 20 September 2022. The cast was Gerianne Pérez as Aragon, Alexandra "Zan" Berube as Boleyn, Amina Faye as Seymour, Terica Marie as Cleves, Aline Mayagoitia as Howard and Sydney Parra as Parr. In April 2024, a new cast for the "Boleyn" tour was announced including Cassie Silva as Anne Boleyn, Kristina Leopold as Catherine of Aragon, and Kelly Denice Taylor as Jane Seymour.

=== Canadian productions (2023–2024) ===
A Canadian production of Six played first at the Citadel Theatre in Edmonton between 12 August 2023 and 10 September 2023. and then transferred to the Royal Alexandra Theatre in Toronto where it began on 23 September 2023 and closed on 26 May 2024.

=== International productions ===
Six had its Asian premiere at the Shinhan Card Artium in South Korea, the musical's first non-English production, opening on 10 March 2023, with the cast of the 2022 UK tour performing the roles for three weeks. The 2022 UK tour cast featured Chlöe Hart as Catherine of Aragon, Jennifer Caldwell as Anne Boleyn, Casey Al-Shaqsy as Jane Seymour, Jessica Niles as Anna of Cleves, Rebecca Wickes as Katherine Howard, and Alana M. Robinson as Catherine Parr.

Beginning 31 March 2023, a Korean cast began performances. Multiple actors split the roles, including Lee Arumsoul and Son Seung-yeon as Catherine of Aragon, Kim Ji-woo and Bae Soo-jung as Anne Boleyn, Park Hye-na and Park Ga-ram as Jane Seymour, Kim Ji-sun and Choi Hyun-sun as Anna of Cleves, Kim Ryeo-won and Heo Sol-ji as Katherine Howard, and Yoo Joo-hye and Hong Ji-hee as Catherine Parr.

The Madách Theatre in Budapest, Hungary, presented a non-replica staging that opened on 14 October 2023.

A Polish non-replica production opened at Teatr Syrena in Warsaw on 9 September 2023. It was directed and choreographed by Ewelina Adamska-Porczyk.

A Japanese production began performances with multiple actors splitting the roles, including Emiko Suzuki and Sonim as Catherine of Aragon, Meimi Tamura and Maho Minamoto as Anne Boleyn, Mahya Harada and Harumi as Jane Seymour, Eliana and Marie Sugaya as Anna of Cleves, Airi Suzuki and Erika Toyohara as Katherine Howard and Sora Kazuki and Ruki Saito as Catherine Parr. Most of the cast are set to perform a one-week engagement at the Vaudeville Theatre in the West End (where Six currently plays in London) in November 2025 in Japanese, becoming the first foreign language production of the show to be performed in the West End.

A Croatian production was planned for May 2025.

A Spanish replica production began previews at the Teatro Gran Via in Madrid on 12 September 2026, with an official opening on 17 September. The cast included Clara Lanzani as Catherine of Aragon, Udara Zubillaga as Anne Boleyn, Beatriz Santana as Jane Seymour, Liz Tatis as Anna of Cleves, Arianna Galletti as Katherine Howard and Alba Egilo as Catherine Parr.

== Cast and characters ==
| Role | West End | UK tour | West End | North American tour | UK tour | Australia | Broadway | North American tour | North American tour | Canada |
| Role | 2017 | 2018 | 2019 | | | | 2021 | 2022 | | 2023 |
|---|---|---|---|---|---|---|---|---|---|---|
| Catherine of Aragon | Renée Lamb | Jarnéia Richard-Noel | Jarnéia Richard-Noel | Adrianna Hicks | Lauren Drew | Chloé Zuel | Adrianna Hicks | Khaila Wilcoxon | Gerianne Pérez | Jaz Robinson |
| Anne Boleyn | Christina Modestou | Millie O'Connell | Millie O'Connell | Andrea Macasaet | Maddison Bulleyment | Kala Gare | Andrea Macasaet | Storm Lever | Zan Berube | Julia Pulo |
| Jane Seymour | Natalie Paris | Natalie Paris | Natalie Paris | Abby Mueller | Lauren Byrne | Loren Hunter | Abby Mueller | Jasmine Forsberg | Amina Faye | Maggie Lacasse |
| Anna of Cleves | Genesis Lynea | Alexia McIntosh | Alexia McIntosh | Brittney Mack | Shekinah McFarlane | Kiana Daniele | Brittney Mack | Olivia Donalson | Terica Marie | Krystal Hernández |
| Katherine Howard | Aimie Atkinson | Aimie Atkinson | Aimie Atkinson | Samantha Pauly | Jodie Steele | Courtney Monsma | Samantha Pauly | Didi Romero | Aline Mayagoitia | Elysia Cruz |
| Catherine Parr | Izuka Hoyle | Maiya Quansah-Breed | Maiya Quansah-Breed | Anna Uzele | Athena Collins | Vidya Makan | Anna Uzele | Gabriela Carrillo | Sydney Parra | Lauren Mariasoosay |

=== Notable replacements ===
==== West End ====
- Catherine of Aragon: Amy Di Bartolomeo
- Anne Boleyn: Courtney Bowman
- Jane Seymour: Claudia Kariuki
- Katherine Howard: Sophie Isaacs
- Catherine Parr: Danielle Steers

Show co-creator Toby Marlow filled in as Catherine Parr for two West End performances on 28 July 2019 due to a cast-wide illness.

==== Broadway ====
- Anne Boleyn: Dylan Mulvaney, Kirstin Maldonado
- Jane Seymour: Jasmine Forsberg
- Katherine Howard: Didi Romero, Abigail Barlow
- Catherine Parr: Joy Woods, Taylor Iman Jones

=== Supporting players ===
Included on-stage is the back-up band, known as "The Ladies in Waiting". The band provides part of the accompaniment and are costumed and assume the persona of a "historical" lady-in-waiting. The band consists of drummer María, bassist Bessie, guitarist Maggie and keyboardist Joan. According to Playbill, the on-stage band members, "execute a myriad of musical cues, acting choices, and subtle choreography that further immerse the audience into the concert experience and underscore the razor-sharp wit of the show’s libretto."

== Musical numbers ==
- "Ex-Wives" – Company
- "Ex-Wives (Reprise)" – Company †
- "No Way" – Catherine of Aragon and Company
- "The One You've Been Waiting For" – Company †
- "Don't Lose Ur Head" – Anne Boleyn and Company
- "Heart of Stone" – Jane Seymour and Company
- "Haus of Holbein" – Company
- "Get Down" – Anna of Cleves and Company
- "All You Wanna Do" – Katherine Howard and Company
- "I Don't Need Your Love" – Catherine Parr
- "I Don't Need Your Love (Remix)" – Catherine Parr and Company ††
- "Six" – Company
- "The Megasix" – Company †
- "Playout" – The Ladies in Waiting †

† Not included on the studio cast recording.
†† Included as part of "I Don't Need Your Love" on the studio cast recording.

=== Cast recordings ===
==== Studio cast recording ====
Six (Studio Cast Recording) is a studio album that was released digitally and on CD on 31 August 2018 through 6 Music, Loudmouth Music, and Ex-Wives Ltd. The recording was released on vinyl for the first time on 11 March 2022. The studio cast included, Renée Lamb (Catherine of Aragon), Christina Modestou (Anne Boleyn), Natalie Paris (Jane Seymour), Genesis Lynea (Anna of Cleves), Aimie Atkinson (Katherine Howard), Izuka Hoyle (Catherine Parr). The recording peaked at number four on the UK Soundtracks chart, ten on the UK Compilation Chart, 65 on the UK Album Downloads Chart, and number two on the US Cast Albums chart. It was certified platinum in the UK in 2025, "Don't Lose Ur Head" was certified Silver in 2022 and "Ex-Wives" was certified Gold in 2026. An instrumental "sing-along" version was released on 30 July 2019.

==== Live original Broadway cast recording ====
Six: Live on Opening Night (Original Broadway Cast Recording) is a live album recorded by the original Broadway cast on their official opening night at the then Brooks Atkinson Theatre on 3 October 2021. This differed from the original London recording, and was the first time in Broadway history that an original cast recorded their musical's cast album live during its opening night. The cast recording was released digitally on 6 May 2022. It includes all of the musical numbers in the show, as well as a bonus song by the Broadway alternates. It debuted at #1 on the Billboard's Cast Album charts, and was streamed over 3.5 million times within two weeks of its release. The recording was released on CD and vinyl.

==== Oirginal Korean cast recording ====
A Korean-language cast album was released digitally on 22 September 2026. The recording features members of the original 2023 Korean cast, including Son Seung-yeon as Catherine of Aragon, Kim Ji-woo as Anne Boleyn, Park Hye-na as Jane Seymour, Choi Hyun-sun as Anna of Cleves, Kim Ryeo-won as Katherine Howard, and Yoo Joo-hye as Catherine Parr. The album marks the first official Korean-language cast recording of the musical and was released ahead of the production's return to Seoul in December 2026.

==== Original Spanish cast recording ====
A Spanish-language cast album was released digitally on 20 November 2026 featuring the original Madrid cast.

== Concept ==
All six of King Henry VIII's wives are in a band and they are competing to see which queen had the worst fate to see who got to lead the band. They each tell their stories through song and towards the end after Katherine Howard's song they start to argue. But Catherine Parr ends this bickering by saying that they should stop comparing themselves and find something in common with each other, other than their husband. The musical end with Catherine Parr's song and the song 'SIX' all about what they would've liked their lives to be like without King Henry.

=== Casting ===
Marlow and Moss lamented the lack of gender diversity within the theatre industry, which caused them to focus on themes of queerness while developing the show. They wanted a cast that was predominantly female or non-binary and the story itself to feature queer narratives in a space which normally didn't.

=== Historical accuracy ===
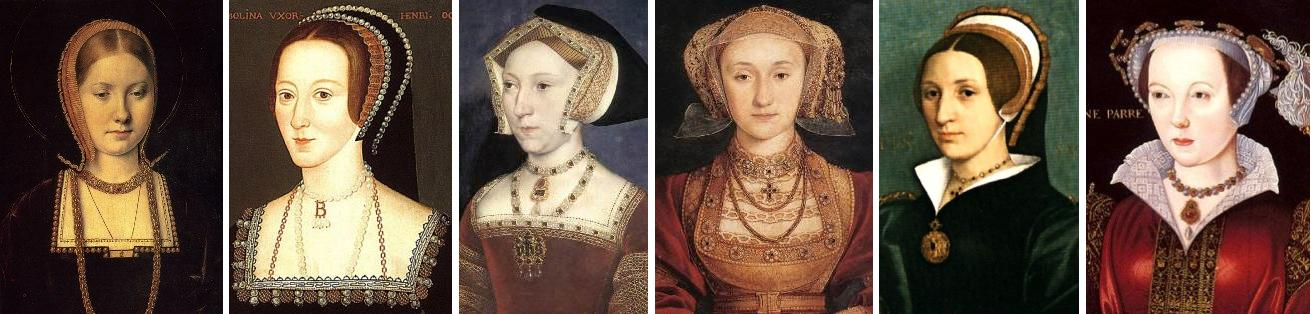
Portraits of the six wives of Henry VIII

Six is based on real historical events and figures, but it does take artistic liberties in its portrayal of these characters. The musical incorporates some elements of historical fact, such as the marriages, divorces (which were legally, annulments), and executions of two of the six queens.

The show is based on historical figures with varying degrees of accuracy. Generally, the show is quite sympathetic towards its characters: for instance, it portrays Katherine Howard as a survivor of rape, which is debated amongst historians. Researchers and writers such as Suzannah Lipscomb and Gareth Russell have identified themselves as fans of the show.

=== Audio production ===
Rather than the more typical head-worn microphones used in most musicals, the Queens use hand-held radio microphones. Their costumes have a loop to hold these when not in use. Marlow and Moss said that they chose to use handheld microphones "to present a unique experience, something that referenced Beyoncé at Roseland". The Queens also wear in-ear monitors.

== Reception ==
In a review of the Arts Theatre production, Dominic Cavendish of The Telegraph called the show "gloriously – persuasively – coherent, confident and inventive". Lyn Gardner of The Guardian wrote, "It may be cloaked in silliness, but Six makes some serious points about female victimhood and survival."

In a review of the Chicago production, Chris Jones of The Chicago Tribune praised the show as "dynamic" and a "blast", with a "sense of humor and spirited radicalism." Marlow and Moss are "gifted comic writers", he said, and he praised the "musical force of the intensely committed and talented actresses" in the Chicago cast. Jones suggested the show could use 10 more minutes of material that gets away from the plot's singing contest conceit, and toward the emotional centre of the characters. He also thought the orchestration of the songs could be more substantial. Jones said Six has an audience that is ready for it, in part because it gets to a complex historical paradox and treats it with verve, the memories of women in history being tied to the life of a man.

Hedy Weiss of WTTW praised the musical as "sensational", singling out each performer in the Chicago cast. Weiss also thought the show makes a convincing case for each character, and in addition to praising the writers, noted the "dynamite direction by Moss and Jamie Armitage, and powerhouse music direction by Roberta Duchak" as well as, "Gabriella Slade’s glittering costumes ... and Tim Deiling’s arena-style lighting". According to Rachel Weinberg of BroadwayWorld, "Six carries out [a] joyful and anachronistic takedown of the patriarchy" through the performances of a "brilliant" cast and a book and score with an inventive and sensational compositional method. Jesse Green of The New York Times wrote that the musical is "pure entertainment", the writing is "wickedly smart", the "terrific singers" of the Chicago cast sell the show "unstintingly", and the production values "befit a splashy North American premiere with Broadway backing."

The reviews for the 2021 Broadway production were positive. Green's New York Times review of the Broadway production labelled it a "Critic's Pick", calling it a "rollicking, reverberant blast from the past". Frank Rizzo of Variety said, "It may not be Masterpiece Theatre, but this 'Six' is a solid '10' for joy." Johnny Oleksinski of New York Post gave the show three stars out of a possible four calling the songs "whip-smart and catchy".

== Honours and awards ==
=== Original West End production ===
| Year | Award | Category | Nominee | Result |
|---|---|---|---|---|
| 2019 | Laurence Olivier Award | Best New Musical | | Nominated |
| 2019 | Laurence Olivier Award | Best Actress in a Supporting Role in a Musical | Aimie Atkinson, Alexia McIntosh, Millie O'Connell, Natalie Paris, Maiya Quansah-Breed and Jarnéia Richard-Noel | Nominated |
| 2019 | Laurence Olivier Award | Outstanding Achievement in Music | Joe Beighton, Tom Curran, Toby Marlow and Lucy Moss | Nominated |
| 2019 | Laurence Olivier Award | Best Theatre Choreographer | Carrie-Anne Ingrouille | Nominated |
| 2019 | Laurence Olivier Award | Best Costume Design | Gabriella Slade | Nominated |
| 2020 | Black British Theatre Awards | Best Female Actor in a Musical | Maiya Quansah-Breed | Nominated |

=== Original Broadway production ===
| Year | Award | Category | Nominee | Result |
|---|---|---|---|---|
| 2020 | Drama League Awards | Outstanding Production of a Musical | | Nominated |
| 2020 | Drama League Awards | Distinguished Performance Award | Brittney Mack | Nominated |
| 2022 | Tony Awards | | | |
| 2022 | Tony Awards | Best Musical | | Nominated |
| 2022 | Tony Awards | Best Original Score | Toby Marlow and Lucy Moss | Won |
| 2022 | Tony Awards | Best Direction of a Musical | Lucy Moss and Jamie Armitage | Nominated |
| 2022 | Tony Awards | Best Costume Design in a Musical | Gabriella Slade | Won |
| 2022 | Tony Awards | Best Lighting Design in a Musical | Tim Deiling | Nominated |
| 2022 | Tony Awards | Best Sound Design of a Musical | Paul Gatehouse | Nominated |
| 2022 | Tony Awards | Best Choreography | Carrie-Anne Ingrouille | Nominated |
| 2022 | Tony Awards | Best Orchestrations | Tom Curran | Nominated |
| 2022 | Drama Desk Awards | Outstanding Musical | | Nominated |
| 2022 | Drama Desk Awards | Ensemble Award | Adrianna Hicks, Andrea Macasaet, Brittney Mack, Abby Mueller, Samantha Pauly, and Anna Uzele | Won |
| 2022 | Drama Desk Awards | Outstanding Costume Design of a Musical | Gabriella Slade | Won |
| 2022 | Drama Desk Awards | Outstanding Scenic Design of a Musical | Emma Bailey | Nominated |
| 2022 | Drama Desk Awards | Outstanding Sound Design in a Musical | Paul Gatehouse | Nominated |
| 2022 | Drama Desk Awards | Outstanding Director of a Musical | Lucy Moss and Jamie Armitage | Nominated |
| 2022 | Drama Desk Awards | Outstanding Choreography | Carrie-Anne Ingrouille | Nominated |
| 2022 | Drama Desk Awards | Outstanding Orchestrations | Tom Curran | Nominated |
| 2022 | Drama Desk Awards | Outstanding Music | Toby Marlow and Lucy Moss | Won |
| 2022 | Drama Desk Awards | Outstanding Lyrics | Toby Marlow and Lucy Moss | Won |
| 2022 | Drama Desk Awards | Outstanding Book of a Musical | Toby Marlow and Lucy Moss | Nominated |
| 2022 | Outer Critics Circle Award | Outstanding New Broadway Musical | | Won |
| 2022 | Outer Critics Circle Award | Outstanding New Score | Lucy Moss and Toby Marlow | Won |
| 2022 | Outer Critics Circle Award | Outstanding Costume Design | Gabriella Slade | Won |
| 2023 | Grammy Awards | Best Musical Theater Album | | Nominated |

== Adaptations ==
=== SIX The Musical Live! - Filmed stage production ===
In June 2022, it was announced that there would be a live recording of the stage production. All of the original West End cast members returned to reprise their roles. Tapings were held on 29–30 June 2022 at the Vaudeville Theatre, with audience tickets sold via a virtual lottery for a performance on 1 July 2022, the final recording day. The professionally filmed live recording, later titled SIX The Musical Live!, released on 6 April 2025 in UK and Ireland cinemas by Universal Pictures. The film was released in theaters in the US and Canada on August 14, 2026.

The film broke several box office records, including the highest opening day figure for a musical ever and became the third highest single day gross for an event film ever. It also opened on the widest screen count for an event film in the UK, across 700 venues, surpassing Taylor Swift: The Eras Tour. Cinemas across the country have added many more screenings due to popular demand.

=== Potential film adaptation ===
In October 2020, co-creators Moss and Marlow confirmed that they were "in talks" about a potential film adaptation of the musical.

=== 2025 single ===
On 3 April 2025, a single titled "My Girls", written by both Marlow and Moss, and performed by SVN, the Original West End cast's related pop/R&B themed band formed back in the year of 2020 was released to celebrate the film’s release.
