= Adrianna Hicks =

American actress

- Born: California
- Education: University of Oklahoma

Adrianna Hicks is a musical theatre actress known for originating the roles of Catherine of Aragon in the Broadway production of SIX and Sugar in the musical adaptation of Some Like It Hot. She has also appeared in Aladdin and The Color Purple, the latter of which marked her Broadway debut. Hicks also appeared in the deluxe version of the Heathers: The Musical original cast album, singing "Never Shut Up Again" as Heather Duke.

== Early life ==
Hicks was raised in McKinney, Texas. She grew up singing in church choirs, leading to her developing a love of music. She later learned to play flute, playing in her school band. As a sophomore at McKinney High School, she was introduced to musical theater and was immediately drawn to it.

In 2011, she received her Bachelor of Fine Arts in Musical Theatre from the University of Oklahoma Weitzenhoffer School of Musical Theatre, where she was awarded a scholarship by the Congressional Black Caucus.

== Career ==
Hicks began her professional career in Germany with Stage Entertainment. While in Germany, she performed in “Dirty Dancing — The Classic Story on Stage” and Sister Act. She also performed in Legally Blonde in Austria.

In 2015, Hicks made her Broadway debut in The Color Purple as a swing. After acting in Aladdin, Hicks returned to The Color Purple in the national tour, where she played Celie. She returned to the role in 2018 at the Paper Mill Playhouse in a production directed by John Doyle.

In 2019, Hicks joined the North American premiere cast of SIX as Catherine of Aragon. She continued with the cast to the 2020 Broadway previews and eventual 2021 opening following the closing of Broadway due to the COVID-19 pandemic. For their performances, Hicks and her co-stars received the newly created Drama Desk Ensemble Award.

On August 7, 2022, Hicks left SIX to join the cast of the new musical Some Like It Hot as Sugar, the role originally played in the movie by Marilyn Monroe.

On November 1, 2024, it was announced that Hicks would return to the Broadway production of SIX and reprise the role of Catherine of Aragon until February 17, 2025.

== Theatre credits ==
Year(s)	Production	Role	Location
2015	The Color Purple	Swing, Celie (replacement)	Broadway, Bernard B. Jacobs Theatre
2017	Aladdin	Ensemble	Broadway, New Amsterdam Theatre
2017	The Color Purple	Celie	National tour
2019	SIX	Catherine of Aragon	Chicago Shakespeare Theater
2019	The Wiz	Dorothy	Broadway at Music Circus
2021	Ratatouille the Musical	Rat Queen	Filmed Virtual Benefit Concert
2021	SIX	Catherine of Aragon	Broadway, Lena Horne Theatre
2021	Beehive: The '60s Musical	Wanda	Paper Mill Playhouse
2022	Some Like it Hot	Sugar "Kane" Kowalczyk	Broadway, Shubert Theatre
2023	Cabaret	Sally Bowles	Peter Jay Sharp Theater
2024	Mary Poppins	Mary Poppins	Lyric Theatre of Oklahoma
2024	Anything Goes	Erma	The Muny
2024-25, 2026	SIX	Catherine of Aragon	Broadway, Lena Horne Theatre

== Awards and nominations ==
Year	Award	Category	Work	Result	Ref
2024	Grammy Awards	Best Musical Theater Album	Some Like It Hot	Won	
