= Natalie Paris =

British stage actress, singer and dancer

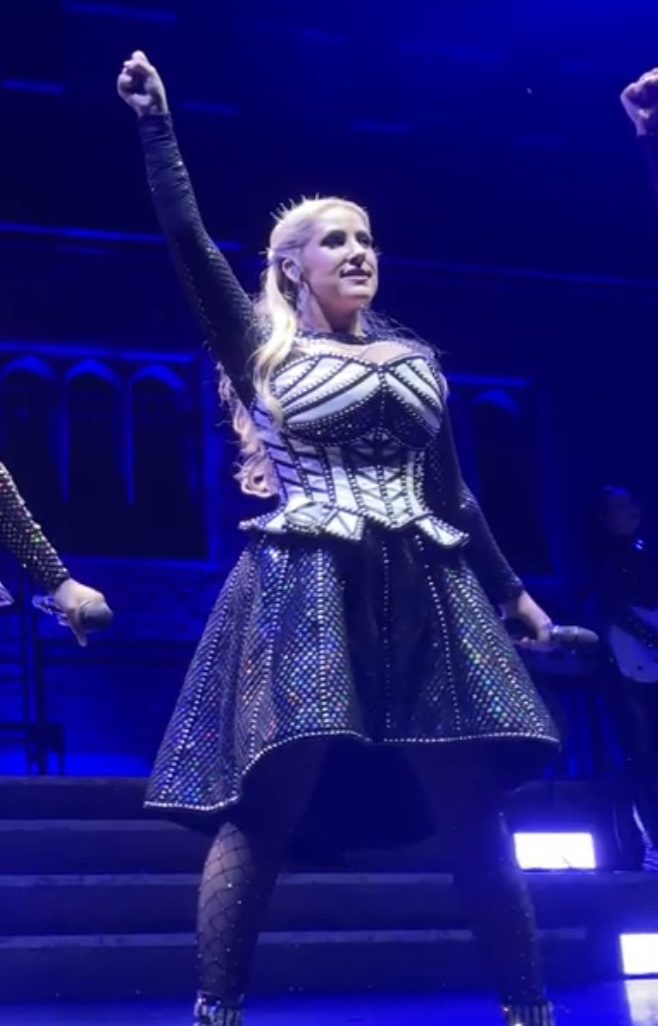
- Paris performing at Hampton Court Palace in 2022
- Born: Natalie May Paris; 6 July 1994 (age 32)
- Education: Italia Conti Academy of Theatre Arts
- Occupations: Actress, singer
- Years active: 2004–present

Natalie May Paris (born 6 July 1994) is a British stage actress, singer and dancer. She is best known for originating the role of Jane Seymour in the hit musical SIX, she was nominated for the Olivier Award as Laurence Olivier Award for Best Actress in a Supporting Role in a Musical in 2019, together with her cast mates.

== Early life and education ==
Natalie grew up on Grange Crescent in Chigwell. She attended Braeside School.

She trained at Finch Stage School from the age of 5. In 2010, she won a Dance and Drama Award for the Italia Conti Academy of Theatre Arts. She then took a West End Masterclass with Michael Xavier and Lindsey Wise, followed by a year-long foundation course at the Royal Academy of Dramatic Art (RADA).

== Career ==
=== Musical theatre ===
Paris started her career in musicals as a child in West End productions such as Les Miserables and Chitty Chitty Bang Bang. She played Louise in the 2005 version of Sunday in the Park with George at the Menier Chocolate Factory with Anna-Jane Casey and Daniel Evans. The show transferred to the Wyndham's Theatre in 2006, with Jenna Russell taking over the role of Dot/Marie. Paris was also part of the original cast recording of the show. In 2014 she played one of the Ballet Girls in the musical Billy Elliott at Victoria Palace.

Paris was part of the cast of the musical SIX since its beginnings, when the show was still in its workshop stage, before the Edinburgh Fringe in 2018 together with Aimie Atkinson. In 2019 Paris and fellow five cast members of the show were nominated for the Olivier Award for Best Actress in a Supporting Role in a Musical. The musical was also nominated for Best New Musical, as well as Marlow and Moss for Outstanding Achievement in Music, Carrie-Anne Ingrouille as Best Theatre Choreographer and Gabriella Slade for Best Costume Design. During the ceremony the full cast performed the song "Ex Wives" from the show. Paris left the show in 2021.

In 2022 the original cast of the musical reprised their roles for three concerts at Hampton Court Palace.

Paris was part of the cast of the new musical The Regulars, which played as a one-night concert at the Hope Mill Theatre, in Manchester on 29 January 2022, as part of the annual LGBTQIA+ Arts Festival.

She played the role of Construction Worker in the UK concert version of Emojiland, that played at the Garrick Theatre in 2022. Also in the cast Louise Dearman as Princess, Renee Lamb as Police Officer, Tim Mahendran as Guard and Dean John Wilson as Sunny. In 2023, she joined the cast of SIX Aragon Tour in the US as Jane Seymour, touring the West Coast and making her US debut. Paris is the longest-running cast member of Six, and since debuting on the show in 2017 hasn't been out for more than ten months. She continued working with Marlow and Moss and in 2022 she premiered the song "How Far We've Come", written by the duo, at the Regenerate: Lost Songs from the Musicals concert.

In July 2023 it was announced that Paris would join the cast of Pretty Woman UK and Ireland tour, in the role of Kit De Luca. The show opened in Birmingham on 17 October 2023 and cast included Amber Davies as Vivian, Oliver Savile as Edward and Ore Oduba as Happy Man/Mr Thompson.

Paris lead the cast of the musical Sea Witch as Evie at the Theatre Royal Drury Lane on 1 March 2026. The show premiered as a one-night-only concert and also included Michelle Visage as Tante Hansa, Mazz Murray as Queen Charlotte, Amy Di Bartolomeo as Annemette, Natalie Kassanga as Malvina and Jay McGuiness as Iker.

In July 2026 it was announced that Paris will return to play Jane Seymour in SIX, this time joining the Broadway cast of the show for a limited run from August to December of the same year. Paris was joined by fellow SIX castmate Aimie Atkinson, joining the Broadway company as Catherine Howard. It was later announced that the show will close on Broadway in January 2027.

=== Music ===
Paris is part of the girl group Sorella, formerly known as The Stereoettes. The group is formed of four members and has toured in venues in the UK as well as the US.

Paris is currently part of the girl group SVN, with Six cast members Jarnéia Richard-Noel (Jaye’J), Millie O’Connell, Maiya Quansah-Breed, Alexia McIntosh (Lexi), Aimie Atkinson, and Grace Mouat. The idea from the group initially came from McIntosh and supported by Atkinson, who in 2020, started discussing the idea for the group with the rest.

In 2021 SVN released their first original song 'Stars' and the group independently released their second single, "Woman", on 28 April 2022.

=== Television ===
Paris was one of the featured vocalist in the 2022, 2024 and 2025 editions of Strictly Come Dancing.

== Credits ==
=== Theatre ===
Year	Title	Role	Theatre	Category	Ref.
2004	Chitty Chitty Bang Bang	Freya/Mini Spy	London Palladium	West End	
2004	Les Miserables	Young Cosette	Queen's Theatre	West End	
2005	Sunday in the Park with George	Louise	Menier Chocolate Factory / Wyndham's Theatre	Off West End/ West End	
2014	Billy Elliott	Ballet Girl	Victoria Palace	West End	
2018	SIX	Jane Seymour	UK Tour, Arts Theatre	UK tour, West End	
2022	The Regulars (concert)	Betsy	Hope Mill Theatre	Regional	
2022	Emojiland (concert)	Construction Worker	Garrick Theatre	West End	
2023	SIX	Jane Seymour	US Aragon Tour	US tour	
2023 - 2024	Pretty Woman	Kit De Luca	UK and Ireland tour	UK and Ireland tour	
2026	Sea Witch	Evie	Theatre Royal Drury Lane	West End	
2026	SIX	Jane Seymour	Lena Horne Theatre	Broadway	

=== Films ===
Year	Title	Role	Notes
2020	Six: the Fully Animated Musical	Jane Seymour	
2025	Six: The Musical Live!	Jane Seymour	

=== Television ===
Year	Title	Role	Notes
2022-2025	Strictly Come Dancing	featured vocalist	44 episodes

== Awards and nominations ==
Year	Work	Award	Category	Result
2019	SIX	Olivier Awards	Best Actress in a Supporting Role in a Musical	Nominated
