= Alexia McIntosh =

British actress

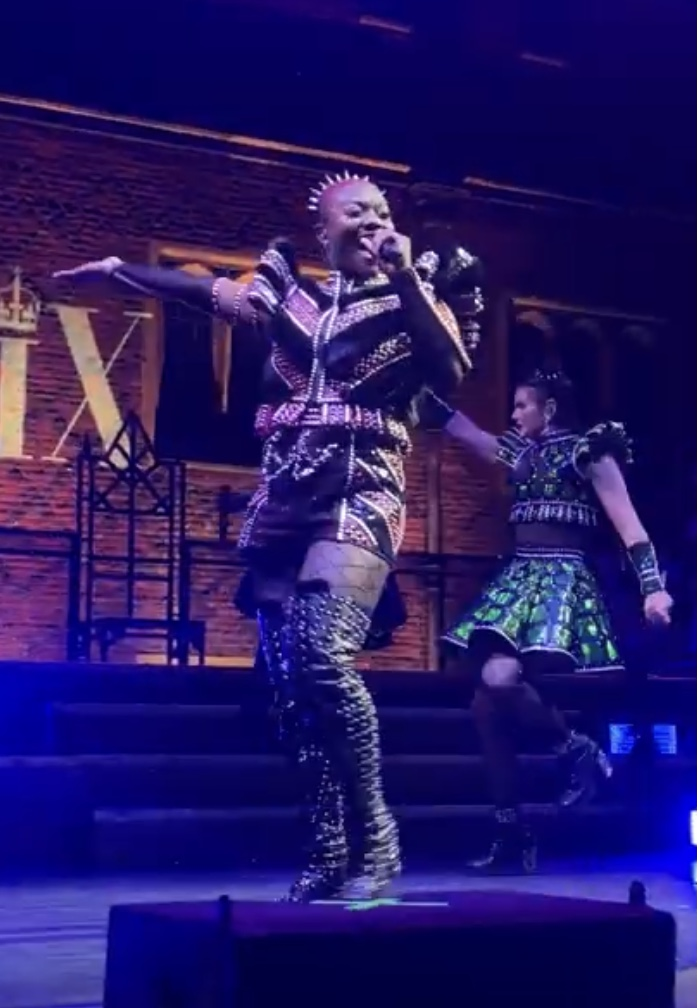
- McIntosh performing at Hampton Court Palace in 2022
- Born: Alexia Elizabeth McIntosh; Birmingham, England
- Other name: Lexi McIntosh
- Education: Birmingham School of Acting
- Years active: 2015–present
- Children: 1

Alexia Elizabeth McIntosh is a British actress. She is best known for being part of the original cast of the musical SIX in the role of Anne of Cleves, for which she received an Olivier Awards nomination for Best Actress in a Supporting Role in a musical in 2019, with her cast mates.

== Early life and education ==
McIntosh was born in Birmingham and is of Jamaican descent.

In 2015, she received a Bachelor of Arts in acting from the Birmingham School of Acting. During her training, she played various roles, including Hermione in The Winters Tale (2013), Mimi in Rent (2014), Elmire in Tartuffe (2014), and Virginia in Soul Music (2015).

== Career ==
=== Musical theatre ===
McIntosh made her West End debut playing Anna of Cleves in the musical SIX. In 2019, the SIX cast members were nominated for the Olivier Award for Best Actress in a Supporting Role in a Musical. During the ceremony, the full cast performed the first song of the show "Ex Wives". McIntosh left the production in November 2021, though she joined other original cast members for three performances at Hampton Court Palace in 2022, before filming a live recording of the show at the Vaudeville Theatre, which was released in April 2025 in UK & Ireland cinemas under the title SIX The Musical Live!.

In 2022, McIntosh joined the cast of the pantomime Goldilocks and the Three Bears at the Birmingham Hippodrome.

In 2023, she played a leading role in the Belgrade Theatre production of Big Aunty.

In 2024, she was the lead in the first production by Birmingham Hippodrome’s New Musical Theatre department, The Jingleclaw.

In 2025 following the release of SIX The Musical Live! in the UK & Ireland, it was announced that McIntosh would be reprising her role Anna of Cleves in the UK & International Tour of SIX temporarily in the UK tour stops, while the main cast perform internationally in China for 8 weeks. She was due to begin to play the role from 20 May, but due to injury joined the cast on 10 June. She is scheduled to play the role until 26 July 2025.

=== Music ===
McIntosh is a member of the girl group SVN, formed in 2020 with original Six cast members Jarnéia Richard-Noel (Jaye’J), Millie O’Connell, Maiya Quansah-Breed, Aimie Atkinson, Natalie Paris and Grace Mouat. The group played their first headline concert in London in August 2022.

==== Discography ====
Year	Title
2021	"Queen"
2021	"Stars"
2022	"Woman"
2022	"Free"
2022	"Boss"

== Theatre credits ==
Year	Title	Role	Theatre
2015	Sister Act	Tina / Nun	Gordon Craig Theatre
2016	Opera for the Unknown Woman	Obax	Fuel Theatre
2016	The Wind in the Willows	Chief Weasel	Old Rep Theatre
2017	Save our School Dinners...Jamie!	Abiola	Belgrade Theatre/Old Rep Theatre
2017	Godiva Rocks	Rosa	Belgrade Theatre
2019-21	SIX	Anna of Cleves	UK Tour, Arts Theatre, Lyric Theatre, Vaudeville Theatre
2022	SIX	Anna of Cleves	Hampton Court Palace, Vaudeville Theatre
2022	Goldilocks and the Three Bears	Candy Floss	Birmingham Hippodrome
2023	Big Aunty	Big Aunty	Belgrade Theatre
2024	The Jingleclaw	Jingleclaw	Birmingham Hippodrome
2025	SIX	Anna of Cleves	UK & International Tour

== Awards and nominations ==
Year	Work	Award	Category	Result
2019	SIX	Olivier Awards	Best Actress in a Supporting Role in a Musical	Nominated
