= Joaquin Pedro Valdes =

Filipino-British stage actor and singer

- Born: Makati, Philippines
- Education: University of the Philippines Film Institute

Joaquin Pedro Valdes is a Filipino stage actor and singer residing in London. He began his career as a child actor and was a member of the boyband 17:28. He has since become known for playing Light in the London concert production of Death Note: The Musical in 2023.

== Early life and education ==
Born in Makati, Philippines, Valdes started his stage career in the Philippines at the age of eleven, when cast in the musical Evita.

He studied Film and Audio Communication at the University of the Philippines Film Institute (UPFI). Valdes moved to London in 2017.

== Career ==
=== Musical Theatre ===
Valdes moved to the UK in 2017, when he was cast as understudy Thuy in the UK tour of Miss Saigon.

In 2018 he joined the International tour of The King and I, understudying the role of Lun Tha and performing alongside Kelli O'Hara and Ken Watanabe.

Valdes was then cast as Ram Sweeney in the West End run of Heathers: the Musical in 2021, with Jordan Luke Gage as JD, Christina Bennington as Veronica Sawyer, Jodie Steele, Bobbie Little and Frances Mayli McCann as "The Heathers".

In May 2023 it was announced that Death Note: the Musical will have its English premiere at the London Palladium in August, as a staged concert version. Valdes was cast in the lead role of Light Yagami, together with Frances Mayli McCann as Misa and Dean John-Wilson as L. The creative team of the UK version of the musical included Alexzandra Sarmiento as associate director and choreographer, Kimie Nakano as costume designer and Ben Cracknell as lighting designer.

The show's run was then extended to September and moved to the Lyric Theatre, with new cast members Georgie Maguire, Jessica Lee and Carl Man, taking over the roles of Ryuk, Misa and alternate L respectively.

In June 2023 Valdes joined the cast of Then, Now and Next at the Southwark Playhouse, as Alex's (Alice Fearn) love interest Stephen. The musical was written by Christopher J Orton and Jon Robyns and directed by Julie Atherton.

=== Music ===
In 2002 Valdes joined the boy band 17:28, under the name Wakie Valdes. The group included Jonard Yanzon, Giancarlo Magdangal and Chino Alfonso.

In 2005 the group announced their split to pursue different ventures.

== Theatre credits ==
Year	Title	Role	Theatre
2017	Miss Saigon	Engineer / Thuy	UK / International Tour
2018	The King and I	Lun Tha (understudy) / Kralahome	UK / International Tour
2020	Fanny & Stella: The Shocking True Story	John Stafford Fiske	The Garden Theatre
2021	Heathers: The Musical	Ram Sweeney	Theatre Royal Haymarket
2021-2022	The Lion King	Simba (understudy)	UK & Ireland Tour
2023	Then, Now and Next	Stephen	Southwark Playhouse
2023	Death Note: The Musical	Light Yagami	London Palladium and Lyric Theatre
2023-2024	Pacific Overtures	Manjiro	Menier Chocolate Factory
2024-2025	The Lightning Thief: The Percy Jackson Musical	Luke Castellan, Ares	The Other Palace
2025	The Frogs (musical)	Heracles	The Southwark Playhouse
