= 17:28 =

Filipino boy band

- Origin: Manila, Philippines
- Genres: Pop, R&B, gospel
- Years active: 2001–2005, 2007
- Labels: Viva Records; Star Music
- Past members: Gian Magdangal; Jonard Yanzon; Chino Alfonso; Joaquin Valdes

17:28 was a Filipino boy band active in the 2000s. Though known as a boy band, they considered themselves more of a vocal group. The group had four members: Gian Magdangal, Jonard Yanzon, Chino Alfonso and Joaquin "Wackie" Valdes.

== Career ==
=== 1997–2002: Formation and Jam Himig contest ===
The group was formed when all four members were still in college, such as that of Magdangal being from La Salle, Alfonso being from Ateneo, and Valdes being an alumnus of UP Diliman. They had performed together in the Christian theater group Trumpets. Yanzon and Valdes were the first members brought together as they had been performing together in the Trumpets production of The Chronicles of Narnia. They then heard Magdangal in their production of The Little Mermaid, and asked him to audition with them. The three of them had also known each other since childhood. The trio then held auditions for one more member, and Chino Alfonso was the last member to join the group. Most of them had experience in the entertainment industry, with Valdes being a singer and theater actor since he was six years old, and Yanzon winning the first Metro Pop Young Singers competition in 1998.

After the band was formed, producer Vic del Rosario discovered them while they were performing a live bar gig. Since then, the group adopted the name 17:28 as a reference to verse 17:28 of the Biblical Book of Acts of the Apostles, "For in him, we live, move and have our being. And as some of your own poets have said, we are His offspring". They chose the name since all of the members were devout Roman Catholics and they agreed on that decision.

17:28 joined the Jam "Himig" songwriting contest, with their reinterpretation of "Last Love Song" by Ron Solis. In the finals of the Jam "Himig" contest, they interpreted "Network I" by Paul Amercin which became popular. Although they lost, that song won at the 8th Katha Music Awards and guaranteed them an album with Star Records. Their version of "Last Love Song" also got an official music video directed by Mae Cruz. 17:28 then auditioned for Star Records and were accepted.

In 2002, though yet without an album, the boys continued performing in various bars and made opening-act guest appearances in concerts of famous Filipino artists.

=== 2002: 17:28 and Valdes' departure ===
Finally late in 2002, the band released their self-titled debut album, 17:28 with 18 tracks from Star Music. The album featured tracks such as "Sukob Na" (which became the 2002 rainy season station ID of ABS-CBN 2), "Come Breathe Me", and "Natutulog Ba ang Diyos?". They were also associate producers on their debut album, with Valdes composing "Come Breathe Me" and Gian composing "Sabi Nila". They then went on a promotional tour of the album, starting at Greenbelt Makati. They also got to perform songs from their album on ASAP. Later that year, Wackie Valdes left the group citing his priorities in his studies (he was studying architecture at UP). Thus, only three members remained.

=== 2004: Cozy and split ===
In early 2004, 17:28 signed with Viva Records. Later that year, they released their second album titled Cozy, a 12-track CD composed of pop ballads and R&B tunes. It featured carrier singles including "S.H.B.G.", "Sana Muli", and "Close Your Eyes", which were mostly written by the band members themselves.

Before 2005, the group publicly announced their split. Its members encountered different paths in life soon after; Yanzon migrated to the U.S., and Alfonso became a working professional, while Magdangal pursued a comeback to the entertainment business as he joined talent contest Philippine Idol and reached the top 3 of the grand finals. He also performed at Hong Kong Disneyland, and had a role in the action series Ang Probinsyano. He also did several Philippine theatre plays. Valdes also returned to his musical theatre roots, starring in Heathers: The Musical and the world premiere of Death Note: The Musical.

The group played one more concert in their hometown, before permanently breaking up again on February 2, 2007. In 2020, they reunited to record a new version of "Sukob Na", with the new version uploaded on Valdes' YouTube channel.

== Artistry and influences ==
The group specialized in pop, R&B, and even gospel music which highlighted their vocal harmonies as a group. They also experimented with hip hop, soul, and jazz. They considered Brian McKnight, Stevie Wonder, Michael Jackson, and Boyz II Men as their inspirations. Valdes listened to Eric Benét, while Alfonso looked up to OPM greats such as Gary Valenciano, Martin Nievera, Jaya, and Kyla. Yanzon was inspired by the song "Bluer Than Blue" by Michael Johnson.

== Awards and nominations ==
Awards and nominations received by 17:28
Year	Award	Category	Recipient(s)	Result	Ref.
2002	8th Katha Music Awards	Best Dance Song	Network I	Won	
2002	8th Katha Music Awards	Best Dance Vocals	Network I	Won	
2002	8th Katha Music Awards	Best Pop Vocal Duo or Group	Network I	Won	

== Discography ==
17:28

- Released: 2002
- Label: Star Music

Cozy

- Released: 2004
- Label: Viva Records
