= Bonnie & Clyde (musical) =

2009 musical

- Original Broadway poster
- Music: Frank Wildhorn
- Lyrics: Don Black
- Book: Ivan Menchell
- Basis: The lives of Bonnie and Clyde
- Premiere: November 10, 2009: La Jolla Playhouse, San Diego
- Productions: 2009 San Diego; 2010 Sarasota; 2011 Broadway; 2022 West End; 2023 Brazil; 2024 UK tour

Bonnie & Clyde is a musical with music by Frank Wildhorn, lyrics by Don Black and a book by Ivan Menchell. The world premiere took place in San Diego, California in November 2009. The musical centers on Bonnie Parker and Clyde Barrow, the ill-fated lovers and outlaws whose story has been infamous since they achieved folk hero status during the Great Depression. Wildhorn described the music as a "non-traditional score, combining rockabilly, blues and gospel music". The San Diego run was followed by a Sarasota, Florida, engagement in 2010.

The musical debuted on Broadway in December 2011. It was nominated for three Outer Critics Circle Awards and five Drama Desk Awards, both including Best New Musical, as well as two nominations for the 2012 Tony Awards. Subsequent productions have since been staged internationally following the submission of the work to Music Theater International, including productions in Japan, Korea, UK and Brazil.

== Background ==
Previously, Black and Wildhorn collaborated on Dracula, the Musical, which also had its world premiere in La Jolla. Wildhorn got in touch with Black about the possibility of writing a song cycle loosely based on the story of Bonnie and Clyde. They released a 13-track demo recording (five of which are still in the present musical but altered considerably) for Atlantic Records with Michael Lanning, Rob Evan, Brandi Burkhardt and Linda Eder sharing the principal roles. The music contains elements of country and western, Blues and Broadway pop. In February 2009, the show held an industry-only reading at Roundabout Theatre Company, starring Laura Osnes as Bonnie and Stark Sands as Clyde.

== Production history ==
=== San Diego (2009) ===
The musical had its world premiere at the La Jolla Playhouse in San Diego, CA beginning in previews November 10, 2009. Opening night was November 22. The run concluded December 20, after 15 previews and 33 regular performances. Jeff Calhoun helmed and choreographed the production that starred Osnes and Sands, along with Melissa van der Schyff as Blanche and Claybourne Elder as Buck. It won five major San Diego Theatre Critics Circle Awards in 2009.

"This World Will Remember Us"
Bonnie & Clyde - Jeremy Jordan and Laura Osnes

=== Sarasota (2010) ===
Due to a positive response from the San Diego run, the show announced a return engagement for the Asolo Repertory Theatre in Sarasota, Florida. Previews began November 12, 2010, before a November 19 opening. It ran for 8 previews and 36 regular performances through December 19, with Osnes being joined by Jeremy Jordan as Clyde. The production's artistic director Michael Edwards stated, "How it goes here, will determine whether it goes to Broadway".

=== Broadway (2011) ===
The success of the Florida production led to the show's Broadway debut in New York City. Previews began on November 4, 2011, at the Gerald Schoenfeld Theatre, with the official opening on December 1, 2011, following the 33 previews. Osnes and Jordan reprised their roles. The producers announced on December 16, 2011, that the show would close on December 30. Originally planned as an open-ended run, it played 36 regular performances. On January 2, 2012, statement, director Calhoun said that he had "never had a show close while it was still playing to audiences like a hit".

=== Off-West End Workshops (2017) ===
The musical held a limited Off West-End workshop-style production at The Other Palace Theatre in London in 2017 featuring Jamie Muscato as Clyde Barrow and Evelyn Hoskins as Bonnie Parker. The show opened on June 26, 2017, and closed on July 1, 2017.

=== West End Concert (2022) ===
The musical made its West End debut on January 17, 2022, for a set of two concerts at Theatre Royal, Drury Lane which concluded the following day. This production directed by Nick Winston was set to reunite original Broadway stars Jeremy Jordan and Laura Osnes in the roles they originated and in their West End debuts. In November 2021, it was reported that Osnes was replaced by Frances Mayli McCann. The concert production was filmed and was made available to stream in June 2024. On the day of the second concert, it was announced that a fully staged West End production of Bonnie & Clyde directed by Winston would begin performances at the Arts Theatre on April 9, 2022.

=== West End Production (2022) ===
The fully-staged musical directed by Winston opened at the Arts Theatre on April 9, 2022. McCann (reprising her role from the concert) and Jordan Luke Gage were announced to be playing the titular roles on February 23, 2022, alongside the rest of the cast, which also featured George Maguire and Natalie McQueen as Buck and Blanche Barrow. This production and subsequent re-staging was choreographed by Alexzandra Sarmiento, who also served as associate director.

=== West End restaging (2023) ===
It was announced on the 25th October 2022 that the West End production would re-open at the Garrick Theatre on March 4, 2023, and on the 7th November 2022 that Frances Mayli McCann and Jordan Luke Gage would reprise their roles as Bonnie and Clyde. Most of the cast reprised their roles, except for Natalie McQueen. Jodie Steele took over Natalie’s role as Blanche Barrow. The production ended on the 20th of May 2023.

=== UK & Ireland Tour (2024) ===
On the 20th May 2023, a UK & Ireland Tour was announced at the final performance of Bonnie & Clyde at the Garrick Theatre. The UK & Ireland Tour began on the 22nd February 2024 and played in Leicester, Dartford, Wolverhampton, Norwich, Manchester, and Nottingham and more. On 21 May 2024 it was announced that the show would "conclude with immediate effect", likely due to a lack of tickets sold.

=== International productions ===
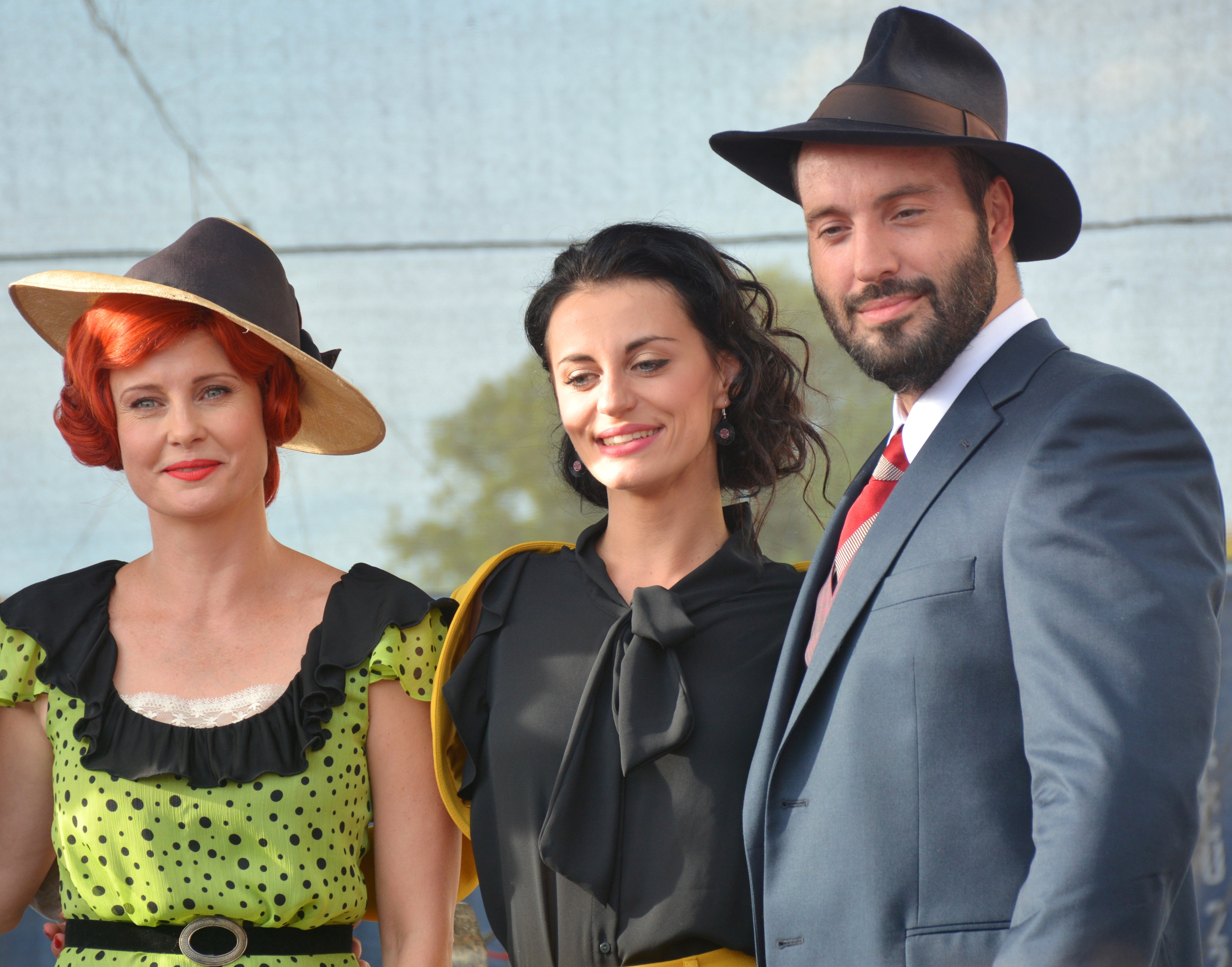
Czech actors Jitka Schneiderová, Markéta Procházková and Václav Noid Bárta as Blanche, Bonnie and Clyde in Prague production (2016)

- A Japanese language production played the Aoyama Theatre in Tokyo, Japan from fall 2011 until January 22, 2012, with Megumi Hamada as Bonnie, Mario Tashiro as Clyde, Koki Okada as Buck, and Yuri Shirahane as Blanche. It was directed by Tetsu Taoshita.
- The first Korean language staging in Seoul, South Korea took place from September 4-October 27, 2013, at the Chungmu Art Hall. The opening night was September 23.
- The U.K. premiere of the musical was staged at ArtsEd in Chiswick, London from January 17–25, 2014, with permission of MTI of New York. Mountview Academy of Theatre Arts presented the show at the Bernie Grant Arts Centre, Tottenham, London in early 2015.
- The first North American regional production was held at the Ice House Theater in Visalia, CA in summer 2014, through Visalia Players.
- The German premiere was staged at the Theater Bielefeld.
- The Irish premiere was staged by University College Dublin in November 2014.
- The Czech premiere was staged by J. K. Tyl Theatre in Plzeň in May 2016. Second Czech production was introduced as major production by Musical Theatre Karlín in Prague in October 2016.
- The first high school production of the show was premiered at Vacaville High School on the 84th anniversary of the duo's death, May 23, 2018, in Vacaville, CA.
- Staged at the Mainline Theatre in Montreal, Quebec (Canada), Contact Theatre presented the English Montreal premiere in April 2019.
- Bonnie & Clyde premiered in Antwerp, Belgium on 27 September 2019. The show was presented by BSO Productions and MusicalVibes and starred Charlotte Campion and Juan Gerlo in the title roles.
- The Swedish premiere was staged in Eksjö in February 2020, starring Fanny Hugosson as Bonnie, and Mikael Sturesson as Clyde.
- The Polish premiere was staged in Koszalin in September 2021, directed by Kacper Wojcieszek, starring Aleksandra Daukszewicz and Diana Gliniecka as Bonnie, Łukasz Walczak and Ringo Todorovic as Clyde.
- The first Australian production was staged in Sydney in June 2022, produced by Hayes Theatre Co and Joshua Robson Productions, and starring Teagan Wouters and Blake Appelqvist in the title roles.
- In February 2023 the Japanese all-female theater troupe Takarazuka Revue staged it at Misonoza theater in Nagoya with Snow Troupe top star Sakina Ayakaze as Clyde and top musumeyaku Aya Yumeshiro as Bonnie.
- The first Brazilian production opened in March 2023 in an immersive venue. Bonnie and Clyde are played by Eline Porto and the award-winning Beto Sargentelli, both a real-life couple who often star as couples in theater.
- The Danish premiere was staged at Odense Teater in 2023 starring Clara Sophia Phillipson as Bonnie and Christian Collenburg as Clyde.
- The first Finnish production opened in June 2024 at Samppalinna Open Air Theatre in Turku. Directed and translated by Jukka Nylund, choreography by Chris Whittaker and starring Marketta Tikkanen as Bonnie, Karlo Haapiainen as Clyde, Maria Lund as Blanche and Jonas Saari as Buck.
- The first Swedish production opened in March 2026 at Uppsala Stadsteater. Directed and translated by Niklas Riesbeck, choreography by Kyra Bergman and starring Lovisa Lindberg Lekfalk as Bonnie, Nils Reinholtz as Clyde, Karoline Lindland as Blanche and Denny Lekström as Buck.

== Plot ==
=== Broadway production ===
Act I

Bonnie Parker and Clyde Barrow sit in a car, dead ("Prologue"). In Depression-era West Texas, Bonnie is a 20-year-old diner waitress who dreams of a life in the movies. Young Bonnie is also onstage singing about the dream. Young Clyde sings about his dream to become a criminal, similar to Billy the Kid and Al Capone ("Picture Show"). Clyde Barrow, who has just broken out of prison with his brother Buck, discovers Bonnie on the side of the road and a connection is made between the two dreamers as he repairs her car in exchange for a lift into Dallas ("This World Will Remember Me"). Meanwhile, Blanche Barrow urges her husband, Buck, to turn himself in and set things right with the Lord and with the law ("You're Goin' Back to Jail").

"You Love Who You Love"
Bonnie & Clyde - Melissa van der Schyff and Laura Osnes

Bonnie ends up spending the whole day, and several thereafter, with Clyde. She tells him of her grand plans: to be an actress, a poet and a singer. Clyde convinces her to sing him a song ("How 'Bout a Dance?") and assures her that together they'll make both their dreams - his of a life without having to worry about money, hers of fame - come true.

The two go to visit Buck. Clyde is overjoyed to see his brother again and they talk of driving away from Dallas in the latest Ford, which is said to be able to go 60 miles per hour ("When I Drive"). However, when Clyde hears of Buck's plan to turn himself in and complete his sentence, he is strongly opposed to the idea and leaves angrily. However, Clyde is eventually caught by Ted and the other authorities, while Buck turns himself in ("God's Arms Are Always Open"). In the jailhouse, Ted and Clyde reflect on their love for Bonnie ("You Can Do Better Than Him"). Bonnie professes her love for Clyde as Blanche does the same for Buck ("You Love Who You Love"). Buck is released quickly, while Clyde receives a much harsher jail sentence, and then faces a difficult time of continuous physical and sexual assault while in prison. At the peak of his abuse, Clyde turns to a makeshift weapon and performs his first murder ("Raise a Little Hell"). He convinces Bonnie to smuggle a gun into his cell, and Clyde again breaks out of prison, this time killing a deputy ("This World Will Remember Us").

Act II

Bonnie and Clyde begin a life of crime, robbing stores and traveling all around to avoid being caught ("Made in America"). During a grocery store robbery gone wrong, Clyde shoots a deputy who was, in his words: 'trying to be a hero'. When she hears that Clyde has gone from robbery to murder, a frenzied Bonnie wants out ("Too Late to Turn Back Now") but realizes that she is too far from what she has known to go back. In part due to the grocery store shooting, the two achieve folk hero status throughout the country, with officers in every Southern state on the hunt for them. Clyde sends occasional letters to Buck and Blanche, telling them of the adventures and opportunities they have made on the road. Buck begins to see that there is more for them out there than can be found in their current situation, and he unsuccessfully tries to convince Blanche that they should join Clyde and Bonnie ("That's What You Call a Dream").

The infamous duo, meanwhile, continues on their robbery spree, growing increasingly bold in their endeavors ("What Was Good Enough for You") and graduating from stores to banks. In the midst of an unsuccessful bank robbery, Clyde is shot in the shoulder. Upon hearing of his brother's injury, Buck leaves home along with his wife, who is torn between her love for her husband and what she knows is right - to help Clyde. In the hideout, Clyde and Bonnie share a tender moment ("Bonnie") before being interrupted by Buck at the door. He is with a reluctant Blanche; her love for her husband won out in the end. Days later, Bonnie and Blanche nervously await the return of Clyde and Buck from a robbery ("Raise a Little Hell (reprise)"), as Blanche questions how Bonnie can happily live the way they do. Bonnie replies that she and Clyde are the only ones truly living life to the fullest ("Dyin' Ain't So Bad"). Buck and Clyde return, with their respective partners, elated to see them, but the celebration is short-lived as they learn that they have been followed by the authorities to the hideout. A shootout ensues, in which Buck is mortally wounded. Clyde quickly whisks Bonnie away, but a heartbroken Blanche stays with Buck until his dying breath and is arrested for aiding and abetting ("God's Arms Are Always Open (reprise)"). Ted reports back to the Sheriff, having been told by Bonnie's mother of Bonnie and Clyde's whereabouts, and they prepare to ambush the couple. A guilty Ted convinces himself he is doing the right thing ("You Can Do Better Than Him (reprise)").

In the woods on the way back to Dallas, Clyde wonders how his family will even be able to look at him after what he has done to Buck ("Picture Show (reprise)"). Bonnie assures him that it was not his fault, but both realize that they are nearing the end of their fateful journey ("Dyin' Ain't So Bad (reprise)" / "How 'Bout a Dance? (reprise)"). On May 23, 1934, on a rural Louisianan road, Bonnie and Clyde are ambushed and killed by police on the way to meet their parents.

== Musical numbers ==
Act I

- "Prologue" – Orchestra
- "Picture Show" – Young Bonnie, Young Clyde, Bonnie, Clyde
- "Picture Show - Reprise" - Bonnie †
- "This World Will Remember Me" – Clyde, Bonnie
- "This World Will Remember Me - Reprise" - Clyde †
- "You're Goin' Back to Jail" – Blanche, Buck, Salon Women
- "How 'Bout a Dance?" – Bonnie
- "When I Drive" – Clyde, Buck
- "God's Arms Are Always Open" – Preacher, Blanche, Congregation
- "You Can Do Better Than Him" – Ted, Clyde
- "You Love Who You Love" – Bonnie, Blanche
- "Raise a Little Hell" – Clyde
- "This World Will Remember Us" – Clyde, Bonnie

Act II

- "Entr'acte"† – Orchestra
- "Made in America" – Preacher, Ensemble
- "Too Late to Turn Back Now" – Clyde, Bonnie
- "That's What You Call a Dream" – Blanche
- "What Was Good Enough For You" – Clyde, Bonnie
- "Bonnie" – Clyde
- "Raise a Little Hell (reprise)" – Clyde, Buck, Ted
- "Dyin' Ain't So Bad" – Bonnie
- "God's Arms Are Always Open (reprise)"† – Blanche, Preacher
- "You Can Do Better Than Him (reprise)"† – Ted
- "Picture Show (reprise)"† – Young Bonnie, Young Clyde
- "Dyin' Ain't So Bad (reprise)" – Clyde, Bonnie
- "How 'Bout a Dance? (reprise)" – Bonnie

†Not on the Original Broadway Cast Recording.

== Casts ==
- Below are the principal cast members of all major productions of Bonnie & Clyde to date.

Role	San Diego Tryout	Florida Tryout	Broadway	Off-West End	West End Concert	West End	West End Restaging	UK Tour
Role	2009	2010	2011	2017	2022		2023	2024
Bonnie Parker	Laura Osnes	Laura Osnes	Laura Osnes	Evelyn Hoskins	Frances Mayli McCann	Frances Mayli McCann	Frances Mayli McCann	Katie Tonkinson
Clyde Barrow	Stark Sands	Jeremy Jordan	Jeremy Jordan	Jamie Muscato	Jeremy Jordan	Jordan Luke Gage	Jordan Luke Gage	Alex James-Hatton
Blanche Barrow	Melissa van der Schyff	Melissa van der Schyff	Melissa van der Schyff	Rebecca Trehearn	Natalie McQueen	Natalie McQueen	Jodie Steele	Catherine Tyldesley Daisy Wood-Davis
Buck Barrow	Claybourne Elder	Claybourne Elder	Claybourne Elder	Joshua Dever	George Maguire	George Maguire	George Maguire	Sam Ferriday
Ted Hinton	Chris Peluso	Kevin Massey	Louis Hobson	Sam Ferriday	Liam Tamne	Cleve September	Cleve September	Daniel Reid-Walters
Preacher	Michael Lanning	Michael Lanning	Michael Lanning	Ako Mitchell	Trevor Dion Nicholas	Ako Mitchell	Dom Hartley-Harris	Jaz Ellington AJ Lewis
Sheriff Schmid	Wayne Duvall	Wayne Duvall	Joe Hart	Graham Bickley	Jeremy Secomb	Alistair So	Kit Esuruoso	James Mateo-Salt
Emma Parker	Mare Winningham	Mimi Bessette	Mimi Bessette	Rebecca Lock	Julie Yammanee	Gracie Lai	Julie Yammanee	Jasmine Beel

== Critical response ==
=== Regional ===
==== La Jolla ====
The Los Angeles Times review complimented the leads, saying that Osnes "effectively works the red-headed moll temptress angle while Stark Sands' Clyde flaunts his ripped torso as often as possible. And both possess sharp musical instincts". The Wildhorn score "is undeniably impressive". Although it notes that "stylistically, the work seems beholden to conventional forms yet curious about modern breakthroughs... what is motivating the retelling of this story?"

==== Sarasota ====
"Bonnie & Clyde opened Friday at the Asolo Repertory Theatre with a bang—actually quite a few deadly bangs—and by night's end proved worthy of all the buzz it has created...On balance, though, Bonnie & Clyde has all the markings of a musical bound for success on the Great White Way and should be mandatory viewing for all local theater enthusiasts". - Wade Tatangelo, Brandenton.com.
"There is much to recommend in this show about the two fame-obsessed Texas outlaws in the early 1930s. It boasts two star-making performances by Jeremy Jordan and Laura Osnes in the title roles, smooth and action-packed staging by Jeff Calhoun, an impressive set that also displays historic videos and photos, and a tune-filled score by Frank Wildhorn and lyricist Don Black". - Jay Handelman, Herald-Tribune.

=== Broadway ===
The opening night received mixed reviews. Roma Torre of NY 1 commented that the show "has many virtues but also enough flaws to keep it from blowing you away", while Thom Geir of Entertainment Weekly criticized the show, claiming it "aims for kiss-kiss-bang-bang, but too often it's just firing blanks". However, the two lead performers, Jeremy Jordan and Laura Osnes, received generally good reviews for their performances. Critic Ben Brantley of The New York Times stated that Jordan "exudes a naturally intense presence, and he works hard at making Clyde seem both wholesome and menacing" and that "Ms. Osnes is a lovely young woman of fashion-model proportions and an instinctive, accessible elegance that reads Ingénue," although he went on to add "I don’t think ingénue was what Bonnie Parker was about" and "Clyde, honey, t’ain’t nothing you can do to raise the pulse of something that’s as near to dead as the show you’re in." The cast and crew, as well as many of the production's supporters, expressed that they felt the critics had been biased due to Wildhorn's previous Broadway track record.

== Recordings ==
An original Broadway cast album featuring all 20 musical numbers and a bonus track (the song "This Never Happened Before", which was cut during the show's early stages), was recorded on January 2, 2012, and released on April 24.

Selected songs from the musical were given jazz re-arrangements for a live performance by the Broadway cast at Feinstein's/54 Below; the recording was released on June 6, 2016, as the album Frank Wildhorn and Friends: Bonnie & Clyde and a Whole Lotta Jazz.

The West End cast album was released on July 28, 2023.

== Awards and nominations ==
=== Broadway production ===
Year	Award	Category	Nominee	Result
2012	Tony Award	Best Actress in a Musical	Laura Osnes	Nominated
2012	Tony Award	Best Original Score	Frank Wildhorn and Don Black	Nominated
2012	Drama Desk Award	Outstanding Musical		Nominated
2012	Drama Desk Award	Outstanding Featured Actress in a Musical	Melissa van der Schyff	Nominated
2012	Drama Desk Award	Outstanding Music	Frank Wildhorn	Nominated
2012	Drama Desk Award	Outstanding Lyrics	Don Black	Nominated
2012	Drama League Award	Distinguished Performance	Jeremy Jordan	Nominated
