= Rebecca Lock =

English actress

Rebecca Lock (born in Ely) is an English actress who has worked extensively in musical theatre, including many leading West End roles.

== Early life ==
Lock was a member of the National Youth Music Theatre, and attended Central School of Speech and Drama.

== Career ==
Lock left drama school at 19 to make her West End debut in the 1997 production of Martin Guerre at the Prince Edward Theatre. After initially understudying the lead role of Bertrande de Rols, she subsequently alternated the part and sang the role on the original cast recording. She was then in the Royal National Theatre's production of Oh, What a Lovely War!

In 2000, Lock played Jellylorum in Cats at the New London Theatre. She then appeared in Mary Poppins at the Prince Edward Theatre, (while understudying the lead role of Mary Poppins, she played the part on many occasions, ending up alternating the role).

In 2008 Lock joined the cast of Avenue Q, at the Noël Coward Theatre, in the role of Kate Monster / Lucy the Slut, taking over the role from Julie Atherton. She then took over the role of Carlotta in The Phantom of the Opera at Her Majesty's Theatre in 2009.

She next played Svetlana in Chess at the Princess of Wales Theatre, Toronto, directed by Craig Revel Horwood. Following this, she played the lead role of Mary in Merrily We Roll Along at Theatre Clwyd. In 2013 Lock joined the Gillian Lynne’s production of Dear World at the Charing Cross Theatre as Gabrielle, playing opposite Betty Buckley. Later that year, she played Widow Corney in Oliver! at the Crucible Theatre, Sheffield, directed by Daniel Evans.

In 2014 Lock played Rosie in Mamma Mia! at the Novello Theatre joining Dianne Pilkington as Donna. In 2015 Lock rejoined the cast of Mary Poppins's UK tour, playing the role of Winifred Banks. The cast starred Zizi Strallen, who will then Mary Poppins in the 2019 production of the show at the Prince Edward Theatre. Lock stepped in at the last minute to play the role of Cheryl Gillan MP in Committee at the Donmar Warehouse in 2017.

In 2018, she played Ms. Fleming in the UK premiere of Heathers at The Other Palace and the Theatre Royal Haymarket, directed by Andy Fickman. The cast included Carrie Hope Fletcher as Veronica Sawyer and Jamie Muscato as JD, Jodie Steele was Heather Chandler, Sophie Isaacs Heather McNamara and T'Shan Williams Heather Duke.

At the end of 2018, she played the lead role of Lilli Vanessi in Kiss Me, Kate in a return to Sheffield's Crucible Theatre.

In 2019, she joined Jason Manford and Ore Oduba in a UK tour of Kander and Ebb's Curtains playing the role of Carmen. The show stopped in London at the Wyndham's Theatre in December 2019/January 2020 to then resume its UK tour. In October 2019, she appeared in an episode of the BBC soap opera Doctors as Ursula van der Voort. She also appeared in the mini series Stephen for ITV.

In 2025, Lock starred in the UK premiere of the musical Freaky Friday, as Katherine. The show ran at HOME in Manchester, was directed by Andy Fickman and starred Jena Pandya as Ellie, alongside Lock.

== Stage Credits ==
Year	Show	Role	Theatre	Notes	Ref.
1996	Martin Guerre	Young Bertrande de Rols	Prince Edward Theatre	West End	
2000	Cats	Jellylorum / cover Griddlebone	New London Theatre	West End	
2004	Mary Poppins	Understudy Mary Poppins	Prince Edward Theatre	West End	
2008	Avenue Q	Kate Monster / Lucy the Slut	Noël Coward Theatre	West End	
2009	The Phantom of the Opera	Carlotta Giudicelli	Her Majesty's Theatre	West End	
2013	Dear World	Gabrielle	Charing Cross Theatre	Off-West End	
2013	Oliver!	Widow Corney	Crucible Theatre	Regional	
2014	Mamma Mia!	Rosie	Novello Theatre	West End	
2015-2017	Mary Poppins	Winifred Banks	UK Tour	Regional	
2018	Heathers	Ms Fleming	The Other Palace & Theatre Royal Haymarket	West End	
2018	Kiss Me, Kate	Lilli Vanessi	Crucible Theatre	Regional	
2020	Curtains	Carmen Bernstein	Wyndham's Theatre	West End	
2021-2022	School of Rock	Rosalie Mullins	UK Tour	Regional	
2024	Here and Now	Caz Mcgovern	Alexandra Theatre	Birmingham	
2025	Here and Now	Caz Mcgovern	UK Tour	Regional	
2025	Freaky Friday	Katherine	HOME, Manchester	Regional	
2026	Redcliffe	Mother	Southwark Playhouse	Off-West End	

== Filmography ==
Year	Title	Role	Notes
2019	Doctors	Ursula van der Voort	TV series, 1 episode
2020	Curtains	Carmen Bernstein	filmed stage show
2021	Stephen	Old Bailey Clerk	TV mini series, 1 episode
2023	Ruby Speaking	Helen Windows	TV series, 3 episodes

== Personal life ==
Lock is married to fellow actor Stevyn McDonald. They have a son. She currently resides in Kent.
