= Redcliffe (musical) =

2026 stage musical by Jordan Luke Gage

- Music: Jordan Luke Gage
- Lyrics: Jordan Luke Gage
- Book: Jordan Luke Gage
- Setting: Redcliffe; 1752–1753
- Basis: The real life story of Richard Arnold and William Critchard
- Premiere: Southwark Playhouse, London
- Productions: 2026 Southwark Playhouse

Redcliffe is a stage musical with book, music and lyrics by Jordan Luke Gage, named after the neighbourhood of the same name near Bristol, England. The show is based on the real life story of William Critchard and Richard Arnold, and their love born in a period of persecution between 1752 and 1753.

Directed by Paul Foster, the world premiere production of Redcliffe opened in London at the Southwark Playhouse in May 2026. It is scheduled to transfer to the Criterion Theatre in London's West End from 28 January 2027.

== Productions ==
In interviews, Gage stated he was inspired to write the show after a visit to the Bristol archives.

Redcliffe was first presented at MTFestUK 2024 at the Turbine Theatre. Only Act 1 of the show was presented and the cast included Gage as William, James Darch as Richard, Jess Douglas Welsh as Abigail, Chris Fung as Landlord, Emma Lindars as Landlady and Rebecca Lock as Mother.

In May 2024, a full workshop of Redcliffe ran at The Other Palace in London. Cast included Gage as William, Lauren Drew, Liam Tamne, Rebecca Lock and Jess Douglas Welsh reprising their roles as Mother and Abigail, Joseph Peacock as Arthur and Steven Serlin as Officer/Felix Farley.

At Musical Con 2025, Gage announced that Redcliffe will open as a fully staged show for a limited run at the Southwark Playhouse in May–June 2026. Some of the cast reprised their roles, including Gage, Rebecca Lock and Jess Douglas Welsh and was directed by Paul Foster. The show also announced a series of post-show Q&A sessions with various guests from the theatre industry discussing various aspects of the production.

In November 2026, it was announced that Redcliffe is scheduled to begin previews at the Criterion Theatre on 28 January 2027 prior to an official opening night set for 4 February for a 12-week limited engagement with Gage reprising his role as William.

== Synopsis ==
=== Act 1 ===
In 1752, William Critchard is returning home to Redcliffe for the Christmas holidays, after losing his job as a footman in a nearby mansion. On his way he crosses paths with Richard Arnold, a sailor from London, visiting the area ("Prologue/You'll Never Be Alone").

At home William's mother and sister Abigail are excited to have William back and mother is pressuring him to find a wife ("Pressure Pot"). She sends him to the local pub, where he quietly reads the newspaper in a corner. The pub's customer and owners sing and include Richard, who is visiting, pushing him to join in the song ("A Pint or Four"). A William is leaving, Richard joins him as he's headed in the same direction and the two start showing off their respective knowledge ("A Million Things I Know").

Abigail is dreaming about the local dance and hopes Arthur will ask her to go together, but he is planning to ask someone else. Discouraged Abigail dreams about the dress she is sewing for the occasion ("The Girl From Redcliffe"). Richard invites William to a soiree, which excites his Mother and Abigail as they think this friend that invited him could be a potential love interest ("The Most Amazing Wedding"). However, they are dishartened when they find out this friend is a man, but are hopeful when they hear that there will be women at the soiree. At the soiree, William becomes infatuated with Richard and leads to him kissing him on the way home ("The Soiree"). Richard flees and William is really scared of his own actions and the consequences they might lead to ("Void of Love").

On Christmas Day, Mother expressed her excitement around this day ("Mother's Favourite Day")

=== Act 2 ===
While William and Richard spend the night together, the town barber sees them and reports them to the police. Richard has just left to return to sea, when William is arrested and put in prison ("Rough and Winding"). The town gossip grows, as the case is brought to court and we hear the testimony of the barber ("Barber's Statement/Did you Hear?"). The judge questions his credibility as he was drunk when he saw the two men ("Judge's Question").

After hearing what happened, William's mother is conflicted ("Hurricane"). Abigail collects the money to visit her brother in prison and without judging, asks his how it feels to be in love, with William explaining his feelings for Richard ("I Am Found").

Abigail and Mother research in various court cases, to find a way to help William and find a possible loophole to save him ("Loophole"). One the final day of his trial, William is accused because of a series of letters Richard sent him, which he never read or responded to, as he was already in prison. Richard is also imprisoned because of this ("The Letter"). William confesses with a beautifil declaration of love to Richard ("My Man").

The show ends with the cast stating that in the world there are still 12 countries where same sex relationships are punishable by death.

== Musical numbers ==
Act I

- "Prologue/You'll Never Be Alone" – Full Company
- "Pressure Pot" – William, Mother
- "A Pint or Four" – Landlady, Baber, Richard, Townsfolk
- "A Million Things I Know" – Richard, William
- "The Girl From Redcliffe" – Abigail, Townsfolk
- "A Million Things I Know (Reprise)" – Richard, William
- "The Most Amazing Wedding" – Mother, Abigail, William
- "The Soiree" – William, Richard, Townsfolk
- "Void of Love" – William, Townsfolk
- "Mother's Favourite Day" – Mother
- "Devotion" – Full Company
- "Never Getting Rid of Me" – William, Richard, Townsfolk

Act II

- "Rough and Winding" – Richard, William
- "Barber's Statement/ Did You Hear?" – Full Company
- "Judge's Questions" – Judge, Baber
- "Hurricane" – Mother
- "Felix Farley's Christmas Poem" – Felix, Abigail, Arthur, Townsfolk
- "Minutes Turn to Hours" – Full Company
- "I Am Found" – William
- "Loophole" – Mother, Abigail
- "The Letter" – Richard, William, Judge, Company
- "Home"
- "My Man" – William, Richard, Company
- "The Launch" – William, Richard, Company

== Cast and characters ==
Character	MTFestUK	Workshop	Off-West End	Criterion Theatre West End
Character	2024		2026	2027
William	Jordan Luke Gage	Jordan Luke Gage	Jordan Luke Gage	Jordan Luke Gage
Richard	James Darch	Liam Tamne	Daniel Krikler	
Mother	Rebecca Lock	Rebecca Lock	Rebecca Lock	
Abigail	Jess Douglas Welsh	Jess Douglas Welsh	Jess Douglas Welsh	
Barber	—N/a	Russell Wilcox	Adrian Hansel	
Georgie/Judge	—N/a	Nadine Higgin	Melissa Jacques	
Landlady	Emma Lindars	Leanne Jones	Jade Johnson	
Esther	—N/a	Lauren Drew	Phoebe Kyriakopoulos	
Arthur/2nd Officer	—N/a	Joseph Peacock	Joseph Peacock	
Officer/Felix Farley	—N/a	Steven Serlin	Steven Serlin	
