= Spiderhole (film) =

- Theatrical release poster
- Directed by: Daniel Simpson
- Written by: Daniel Simpson
- Produced by: Patrick O'Neill
- Starring: Amy Noble; Emma Griffiths Malin; George Maguire; Reuben-Henry Biggs
- Cinematography: Vinit Borrison
- Edited by: Johnny Megalos; Jeremiah Munce
- Music by: Jason Cooper; Oliver Kraus
- Distributed by: Soda Pictures
- Release date: 29 October 2010
- Running time: 82 minutes
- Country: United Kingdom
- Language: English

Spiderhole is a British 2010 horror film written and directed by Daniel Simpson. The film is Simpson's feature film directorial debut and is distributed by IFC.

== Plot ==
Four homeless art students move into an abandoned house in London where a hidden terror lurks. Molly (Emma Malin) is waiting in an emergency room. A television news broadcast tells about a missing girl. The physician tells Molly that she has heartburn and to "lay off the spliffs," she goes to her art class where she is drawing a nude woman. Luke (Reuben Henry-Biggs) meets with Molly to go squat. They meet up with Toby (George Magire) and Zoe (Amy Noble), all packing the van to go searching for a vacant home to squat. While driving, they all discuss the legality of squatting and what they will be doing while squatting. When they arrive at their first destination, they quickly discover the residence is too secured and decide to drive around to find a new place.

They drive up to a huge abandoned home, break in, and quickly make themselves at home. Trying to turn on the water valve, Toby and Zoe have sex. Toby bumps into a wardrobe and a few pieces of clothing fall out. As Zoe dances around the room with a hat from the wardrobe, Molly and Luke quickly recognize there is blood on the clothes. Everyone is then freaked out and want to leave. Toby suggests sleeping the night and leaving in the morning. Everyone agrees. After walking up, they discover they are locked inside the house and the tools they used to break in are now missing. They discover their phones are also missing and there is no possible way out of the house. They quickly come to the conclusion they are not alone and begin exploring the house. They discover a dank room with four empty chairs lined up. Going back to the room they slept in the night before, they notice a tiny hole in the boarded window. They begin yelling for help when they see a patrol officer in front of the house looking at their parked van. A door in the room quickly slams shut and a gas begins to seep through the threshold and knocks all four of them out.

Once they awake, Toby is missing and the remaining three frantically start looking for him. While looking, Zoe cuts her leg. The films cuts to Toby sitting in one of the four chairs in the dank room and a rubber gloved hand covers his mouth. Back to the remaining three, Molly asks Zoe to show her where she cut her leg. She brings them to a metal locker. Luke and Molly move the locker and a horrible smell is omitted from a huge hole in the wall. Luke stands in front of the hole and although we do not see him enter the hole in the wall, we are to assume he did as we get a glimpse of a few teeth in a wall pipe. The film cuts back to Toby as he is now tied to a metal cot and he is thrashing in attempts to break free. A man in a hazmat type suit and a surgical mask quickly enters the room and gives him a sedative that knocks him out.

The film cuts back to the remaining three. Zoe starts to verbally assault Luke and asks him what he saw, that he looked shaken up by what he saw. Luke claims he saw nothing, then confesses he saw mutilated body parts. Zoe and Molly are disturbed. As Molly and Luke are talking, Zoe walks back to the hole in the wall and peeks inside. As Luke and Molly realize Zoe is not in the room with them, they rush to the hole in the wall just as Zoe is being dragged in by the man in the hazmat suit. As Molly and Luke are now in a new room (where the hole in the wall leads), Luke tells Molly not to look around as it is gory.

The film cuts to Zoe tied to a metal cot. She can see the man in a hazmat suit cut out Toby's eye and put it in a jar. The man then walks to Zoe. As she pleads for her life, she asks why is he doing his. He mumbles, "I father fear." He exams Zoe's cut leg, leaves the room, and then returns with a hack saw. The film cuts back to Molly and Luke as they find a key in the wall to the fuse box. As Luke opens the box and stats turning on lights, the lights in the room with the man and Zoe start to flicker. Annoyed by this, the man leaves Zoe to deal with Molly and Luke.

Luke is hiding behind a door when he sees the hazmat suited man walk past slowly. Luke and Molly attack the man violently with planks only to find that the hazmat suited man tricked them and put Toby in the suit. Toby quickly dies and the old man appears behind Molly and Luke with the sleeping gas. As Molly tries to drag herself away, Luke is dragged off into a room. Molly passes out.

The film cuts back to the doctor returning to Zoe, who has almost freed herself. He slaps her across the face and begins to quickly cut her leg off. Molly awakens and is in the dank room with four chairs from the beginning. She sees the old man looking at her through a room but does not try to escape. She leaves the room and returns to the room where they spent the first night. She begins removing two stair railings and starts to break the stairs from underneath. She is then in a room eating an ice cube when the old man comes in and knocks her out.

When she awakes, she is tied to a gurney. The man is about to cut her chest when he realizes he has no water in his bowl. Going upstairs to get water, the stairs Molly previously began destroying are starting to give way. The man returns without incident and attempts to cut Molly's chest. He hears a noise upstairs and goes to check it out, leaving the scalpel on the gurney. Molly grabs the scalpel and begins to cut herself free. As the man comes down the stairs, he falls through the sabotaged steps, Molly grabs a wooden object and hits him in the head, knocking him out. She grabs his keys and begins running through the house trying to get free. Entering a room, she sees Luke with a plastic sheet covering him. The old man awakens and begins to get free from the stairs.

Molly runs into what looks like the living quarters and finds a door out with a few locks. Fumbling for the right key, she cannot get the locks opened quick enough before the old man is in the same area she's in. She hides behind a door while the man looks around for her. She sees a few newspaper articles about how a father was beaten in front of his son, and a few identification cards showing the old man was or is a surgeon. The man enters the same room Molly is in, but she has already snuck out and returned to the door to unlock it. The old man is standing in front of an urn (we assume it is his father's ashes) when he hears the jingle of the keys Molly is using to try to get free. The man quickly approaches Molly and attacks her.

The movie goes silent, but the movie is showing her struggle with the man as he drags her though the house and throws her in a dark room. The sound returns as Molly is locked in the room with the only light is a TV that is knocked down and showing only static. She hears a sound and starts to see that there is another person in the room with her. It is the girl from the missing persons broadcast from the beginning of the movie (while Molly was in the emergency room), but she is clearly exhibiting animal instincts. The girl attacks Molly and the movie ends.

== Reception ==
The Guardian gave it 1 out of 5. Philip French of The Observer called it "Murky, morbid and unconvincing."

PopMatters compared it to the film Hostel.
