= Jodie Steele =

English stage actress (born 1991)

- Born: Jodie Samantha Steele; 25 March 1991 (age 35); Basingstoke, England
- Education: Guildford School of Acting
- Years active: 2013–present

Jodie Samantha Steele (born 25 March 1991) is an English stage actress, singer and dancer. She is best known for playing Heather Chandler in the UK Off West End and West End premiere of Heathers in 2018 and Katherine Howard in the UK tour of Six in 2019.

== Early life and education ==
Steele is from Basingstoke and attended Brighton Hill Community School. She graduated from the Guildford School of Acting in 2013.

== Career ==
Steele played Heather Chandler in the UK premiere of the musical Heathers, alongside Carrie Hope Fletcher as Veronica and Jamie Muscato as JD. The show opened in 2018 at The Other Palace and then moved to the Theatre Royal Haymarket. Steele reprised the role for a limited run in the musical's Off-Broadway revival at New World Stages, temporarily taking over for McKenzie Kurtz from October to November 2025. Steele reprised the role for a limited engagement from 19 December through the end of January 2026 following Kurtz's official departure from the production.

In February 2022, Steele was part of But I'm a Cheerleader at the Turbine Theatre in the role of Kimberly/Hilary.

In 2023 Steele joined the cast of Bonnie & Clyde as Blanche, for its transfer to the Garrick Theatre. The show had a sold-out concert run, starring Jordan Luke Gage and Frances Mayli McCann, before opening at the Arts Theatre and then moving to the Garrick.

== Theatre credits ==
| Year | Title | Role | Theatre |
|---|---|---|---|
| 2013 | Bare: the Musical | Ivy | Greenwich Theatre |
| 2014 | Fame | Carmen Diaz | UK Tour |
| 2015 | Jesus Christ Superstar | Soul Girl/First Cover Mary Magdalene | UK Tour |
| 2015 | Legally Blonde | Margot | Kilworth House Theatre |
| 2016 | The War of the Worlds | Ensemble | Dominion Theatre |
| 2016-2017 | Wicked | Standby Elphaba | UK Tour |
| 2018 | Heathers the Musical | Heather Chandler | The Other Palace & Theatre Royal Haymarket |
| 2019-2020 | Six | Katherine Howard | UK Tour |
| 2021 | Hair The Musical in Concert | Sheila Franklin | Turbine Theatre, London Palladium and Mayflower Theatre (Southampton) |
| 2021 | Heathers the Musical | Heather Chandler | Theatre Royal Haymarket |
| 2021-2022 | Gatsby: the Musical | Daisy Buchanan | Southwark Playhouse |
| 2022 | But I'm a Cheerleader | Kimberly/Hilary Vandermueller | Turbine Theatre |
| 2023 | Bonnie & Clyde | Blanche Barrow | Garrick Theatre |
| 2023 | Bat Boy: The Musical | Shelly Parker | London Palladium |
| 2025 | Picture You Dead | Roberta Kilgore | UK Tour |
| 2025 | Heathers: The Musical | Heather Chandler | New World Stages |

== Filmography ==
| Year | Title | Role | Notes |
|---|---|---|---|
| 2015 | Jodie Steele: When I Look in the Mirror | Herself | Music Video |
| 2018 | All Together Now | Herself (contestant) | TV series (series 1) |
| 2018 | Myth | | Video |
| 2020 | The Barn Presents | | TV Series (1 episode) |
| 2021 | All About Casey | Evie | TV Series (1 episode) |
| 2022 | Emmerdale | Receptionist | TV Series (1 episode) |
| 2022 | EastEnders | Jenny | TV Series (2 episodes) |
| 2022 | Professor T | Katerina Kaminska | TV Series (1 episode) |
| 2023 | Empress ClawScream | Empress ClawScream | Short |
| 2023 | Baldur's Gate III | Blinded Elf / Dalthar (voice) | Video Game |
| 2024 | A Merry Royal Christmas | Wilhelmina | in production |
