= Emma Griffiths Malin =

English actress and film director

Emma Bryony Griffiths Malin (born 7 April 1980) is an English actress and film director.

She was born in London, the daughter of David Malin and Susan Griffiths, and was brought up by her parents in west London. Her paternal grandparents are the actors Mark Eden (real name Douglas John Malin) and Joan Le Mesurier. Her first major film role was in Adrian Lyne's remake of Lolita (1997), in which she played Annabel.

In 2003 she starred as the precocious Fleur Forsyte in The Forsyte Saga: To Let, the sequel series to the BBC's hit period drama The Forsyte Saga, and in 2004 in the Agatha Christie's Poirot television film Death on the Nile as Jacqueline de Bellefort. She appeared in the 2009 film House of Boys then starred in the 2010 Agatha Christie's Marple television film They Do It with Mirrors as Gina Elsworth.

She directed the 2003 short film The Modernista.

== Selected film and television roles ==
Film credits include:

- Mary Reilly (1996)
- Yapian Zhanzheng (1997) as Mary Denton
- Lolita (1997) as Annabel Lee
- Gangster No. 1 (2000) as Julie
- The Hole (2001) as Daisy
- Hills Like White Elephants (2002) as the Girl
- Animal (2005) as Justine
- Spiderhole (2010) as Molly

Television credits include:

- The Cazalets (2001) as Louise Cazalet
- The Forsyte Saga: To Let (2003) as Fleur
- Agatha Christie's Poirot – Death on the Nile (2004) as Jacqueline de Bellefort
- The Forsyte Saga (2007) as Fleur
- Agatha Christie's Marple – They Do It with Mirrors (2010) as Gina Elsworth
- Wallander – The Man Who Smiled (2010) as Elin Nordfeldt
