= Jordan Luke Gage =

British stage actor (born 1992)

- Born: 8 April 1992 (age 34); Reading, Berkshire, England
- Education: Mountview Academy of Theatre Arts
- Occupations: Actor, singer
- Years active: 2007–present

Jordan Luke Gage (born 8 April 1992) is an English actor, playwright and composer. He is best known for his musical theatre work, most notably originating the roles of Romeo in the 2019 jukebox musical & Juliet and Clyde Barrow in the 2022 production of Bonnie & Clyde on the West End.

== Early life and education ==
As a child, Gage's family tradition was to attend a show on Christmas Eve every year, with Gage describing productions of The Lion King at age eight and Les Misérables at age thirteen as two integral shows that drew him towards performing. He attended stage camps in his youth and performed for the first time when he was in Year 7 at school and was cast as Mike Teevee in a production of Charlie and the Chocolate Factory.

He attended Leighton Park School and whilst in education played the role of Tony in West Side Story and Mark in a production of Rent. At 18 he attended Mountview Academy of Theatre Arts for his BA training after winning a BBC scholarship, Lionel Bart scholarship and Peter Coxhead award which was rare to receive three scholarships during training. While in education, he appeared in productions of My Fair Lady as Henry Higgins, Girlfriends and Bat Boy: The Musical.

== Acting career ==
Gage landed his first professional role whilst still in training, in Boy George's award winning musical 'Taboo' playing the role of Marilyn. It was agreed that he could graduate early and be a part of the production at the purpose built Brixton clubhouse in London. The show went on to win best revival at the Whatsonstage awards. Gage appeared as a contestant on the twelfth series of The X Factor and received four "yeses" from the judges during the auditions after performing "See You Again" by Charlie Puth.

In 2017, Gage portrayed the role of ensemble member Hoffman in Jim Steinman's Bat Out of Hell: The Musical and also acted as the alternate for the lead role of Strat before taking over as the lead full-time on 4 September 2018 at the Dominion Theatre when original leading actor Andrew Polec left the production. As part of promotion for the show, Gage and the cast performed "Bat Out of Hell" in front of 30,000 people in Hyde Park as part of The Proms.

Gage created the role of Romeo Montague in the Max Martin jukebox musical & Juliet at the show's world premiere at the Manchester Opera House between 10 September and 12 October 2019 and remained a part of the cast when it transferred to the Shaftesbury Theatre on 20 November. He performed six songs on the official West End cast recording: "It's My Life", "Love Me like You Do", "One More Try", "Can't Feel My Face", "Everybody" and "I Want It That Way". The show was forced to close in March 2020 due to the COVID-19 pandemic and, in the interim, Gage starred as Jason "J.D." Dean in a summer revival of Heathers: The Musical at the Theatre Royal Haymarket alongside Christina Bennington. Gage returned to the cast of & Juliet when the show reopened in September 2021. In January 2022, he announced that he was leaving the show and played his final performance on 26 March.

On 23 February 2022, it was announced that Gage would portray the lead role of Clyde Barrow in the original West End cast of Bonnie & Clyde, alongside Frances Mayli McCann as Bonnie Parker, who he had previously performed with in Heathers; The Musical, as McCann had portrayed Heather McNamara. Performances began at the Arts Theatre on 9 April 2022 and the show finished its run on 10 July. During this run, Gage also participated in a one-off script in hand reading of The Pride to celebrate 50 years since the UK's first gay pride rally. On 23 October, Gage performed his first solo concerts at The Outernet. Gage subsequently played Fabrizio Naccarelli in a staged concert version of The Light in the Piazza at Alexandra Palace on 27 November. On 7 November, it was announced that Bonnie & Clyde would be returning to the West End on 4 March 2023, though this time at the Garrick Theatre, with Gage and McCann reprising their roles. The official cast album was released on 28 July 2023, with Gage featuring on twelve of the twenty eight tracks.

He played the title role in a special Halloween concert performance of Bat Boy: The Musical at the London Palladium on 31 October 2023 alongside Trevor Dion Nicholas, Victoria Hamilton-Barritt, and his Bonnie & Clyde co-star Jodie Steele. He returned to the Palladium on 7 April 2024 for a concert performance of Bare opposite Laurie Kynaston.

Gage starred in the original West End cast of Titanique at the Criterion Theatre in the role of Cal beginning on 9 December 2024. He departed the show on 8 June 2025 alongside the majority of the initial company. On 18 June, it was announced that he had joined the cast of the new musical Saving Mozart based on the life of the eponymous composer, as Antonio Salieri. The show opened on 28 July and ran until 30 August.

On 19 October 2025, it was announced that Redcliffe, a new musical written by and starring Gage, would officially open on 22 May 2026 at the Southwark Playhouse for a limited run until 4 July. The premiere followed eight sold-out workshop performances at The Other Palace in 2024. The musical, in which Gage plays the leading role of William Critchard, is set in 18th century Bristol and is inspired by the true story of Critchard and Richard Arnold, depicting the secret romance of the two men at a time of great persecution. As part of the announcement, Gage stated, "It has been my greatest fulfilment creating Redcliffe and exploring the world of 18th-century Bristol, a time that was beyond terrifying for men like me to exist in. To be able to tell this story, one which has never been told on the public stage, and to be able to hopefully move, uplift and change people, is beyond thrilling for me as both writer and actor."

== Personal life ==
Gage is gay, first discussing his sexuality publicly in 2021 during an interview with Attitude. He got engaged to his partner on 1 September 2023. Their wedding took place on 7 July 2025.

== Filmography ==
=== Film and TV ===
Year	Title	Role	Notes	Ref.
2007	Harry Potter and the Order of the Phoenix	Gryffindor Schoolboy		
2014	Cilla	Adrian Barber	2 episodes	
2015	The X Factor	Himself/Contestant		
2015	Cucumber	Luc	1 episode	
2015	How Not to Disappear Completely	David	Film	
2025	Alchemy of the Word	Paul Verlaine	Film	

=== Theatre credits ===
Year	Title	Role	Theatre	Location
2012	Taboo	Marilyn	Brixton Clubhouse	London
2017–2019	Bat Out of Hell: The Musical	Hoffman/Alternate Strat (2017–2018); Strat (2018–2019)	Dominion Theatre	West End
2019–2021	& Juliet	Romeo Montague	Manchester Opera House / Shaftesbury Theatre	Manchester / West End
2021	Heathers: The Musical	Jason "J.D." Dean	Theatre Royal Haymarket	West End
2021–2022	& Juliet	Romeo Montague	Shaftesbury Theatre	West End
2022	Bonnie & Clyde	Clyde Barrow	Arts Theatre	West End
2022	The Pride	Philip	Fortune Theatre	West End
2022	The Light in the Piazza	Fabrizio Naccarelli	Alexandra Palace	Off-West End
2023	Bonnie & Clyde	Clyde Barrow	Garrick Theatre	West End
2023	Bat Boy: The Musical	Edgar/Bat Boy	London Palladium	Concert special
2024	Bare: The Musical	Jason McConnell	London Palladium	Concert special
2024–2025	Titanique	Cal Hockley	Criterion Theatre	West End
2025	Saving Mozart	Antonio Salieri	The Other Palace	West End
2026	Redcliffe	William Critchard	Southwark Playhouse	Off-West End
2026	Thelma & Louise	JD	Young Vic	Off-West End

== Accolades ==
Year	Award	Category	Work	Result	Ref
2020	WhatsOnStage Awards	Best Supporting Actor in a Musical	& Juliet	Nominated	
2022	National Diversity Awards	Positive Role Model for LGBT		Nominated	
2022	West End Wilma Awards	Best Performer in a West End show	Bonnie & Clyde	Won	
2023	WhatsOnStage Awards	Best Performer in a Musical	Bonnie & Clyde	Nominated	
2026	The Stage Debut Awards	Best Composer, Lyricist or Book Writer	Redcliffe	Won	
