= Heathers: The Musical =

Musical based on the 1989 film Heathers

Heathers
- The Musical
- Off-Broadway promotional poster
- Music: Laurence O'Keefe; Kevin Murphy
- Lyrics: Laurence O'Keefe; Kevin Murphy
- Book: Laurence O'Keefe; Kevin Murphy
- Basis: Heathers by Daniel Waters
- Productions: 2009 Endeavor Agency; 2009 Hudson Theatre; 2009 Coast Theatre; 2010 Joe's Pub; 2013 Los Angeles; 2014 Off-Broadway; 2015 Australia; 2017 The Other Palace; 2018 Off-West End; 2018 West End; 2021 West End Revival; 2021 UK & Ireland tour 2021 Off-West End; 2023 UK & Ireland tour 2024 West End Revival; 2024 UK Tour; 2025 Off-Broadway Revival; 2026 Australia & NZ Tour; 2026 Off-West End; 2026/27 UK & Ireland Tour; 2027 North American Tour

Heathers the Musical, known colloquially as Heathers, is a musical by Laurence O'Keefe and Kevin Murphy, based on the 1988 film of the same name written by Daniel Waters. After a sold-out Los Angeles try-out, the show moved Off-Broadway in 2014, with US producers including J. Todd Harris, Amy Powers, RJ Hendricks, and Andy Cohen.

In the United Kingdom, a workshop of the musical at The Other Palace, London, held 5 sold-out presentations in the Studio from May 30 to June 3, 2017. The workshop featured Charlotte Wakefield as Veronica Sawyer and Jamie Muscato as J.D.

The show had its official London premiere in the Theatre at The Other Palace from June 9 to August 4, 2018, starring Carrie Hope Fletcher as Veronica Sawyer and Jamie Muscato as J.D. Produced by Bill Kenwright and Paul Taylor-Mills, directed again by Andy Fickman and with choreographer/associate director Gary Lloyd, the London production transferred to the West End at the Theatre Royal Haymarket, running from September 3, 2018, to November 24, 2018. A new song for Veronica, "I Say No", as well as a few script changes to Act 2 were added for the transfer. A West End cast recording was released on Ghostlight Records on March 1. The album debuted at No. 24 on the Official Albums Chart. The production won the 2019 WhatsOnStage Award for Best New Musical. Carrie Hope Fletcher also won for Best Actress in a Musical.

The musical returned to the West End with performances beginning on June 21, 2021, and ran at the Theatre Royal Haymarket until September 11, 2021. Heathers the Musical re-opened for a record-breaking season at The Other Palace in November 2021 after Bill Kenwright Ltd acquired the venue, where it ran until September 2023. The production toured across the UK and Ireland in 2021, 2023, and 2024 and returned to the West End in 2024 for a strictly limited season. BK Studios (the film and television company of Bill Kenwright Ltd) and Roku released the pro-shoot stage capture of the show, shot at The Other Palace in 2022, on their streaming service in the US in 2022, and it was released under Village Roadshow Pictures and Kaleidoscope Home Entertainment in the UK in 2023.

The musical returned to New York City at New World Stages in 2025. Originally a limited run scheduled to close September 28, the Australian production has been extended four times, with a closing date of October 11, 2026 (in Perth, Australia).

The show is a high-energy black comedy and involves dark subject matter, including murder, bullying, teen suicide, sexual assault, and school violence.

== Synopsis ==
=== Act One ===
In 1989, seventeen-year-old Veronica Sawyer despairs at Westerberg High School's hellish social hierarchy, where students like the heavyset Martha Dunnstock, Veronica's best friend, are tormented by jocks Ram Sweeney and Kurt Kelly, and the school is ruled by a clique called "the Heathers"; weak-willed cheerleader Heather McNamara, bulimic and petty Heather Duke, and "mythic bitch" Heather Chandler. When Veronica's talent for forgery gets the Heathers out of detention, they give her a makeover and elevate her to their inner circle ("Beautiful").

Three weeks later, Chandler orders Veronica to forge a love letter from Ram to Martha, threatening to return her to being a nobody when she hesitates ("Candy Store"). The mysterious, poetry-quoting new kid, Jason "J.D." Dean, criticizes Veronica for betraying her friend. After J.D. wins a fight against Ram and Kurt, Veronica finds herself unexpectedly attracted to him ("Fight for Me"). Veronica's parents express their disapproval over her friendship with the Heathers, but Veronica insists on staying with them so she can survive high school ("Candy Store (Reprise)").

Veronica flirts with J.D. at a 7-Eleven, leading J.D. to open up about his struggles and explain how he intentionally gives himself brain freezes to numb his grief ("Freeze Your Brain"). At Ram's homecoming party, Veronica gets increasingly drunk ("Big Fun"). When the Heathers cruelly prank Martha, Veronica angrily resigns from the group and vomits on Chandler's shoes. Chandler then vows to destroy her reputation. With nothing left to live for, Veronica breaks into J.D.'s bedroom and has sex with him ("Dead Girl Walking").

After being tormented by Chandler in a nightmare, Veronica, with J.D. in tow, heads to her house to apologize. While mixing a hangover cure for her, J.D. adds toxic drain cleaner to a mug and tries to convince Veronica to serve it to Chandler instead. Veronica refuses, but accidentally grabs J.D.'s mug anyway, with him noticing this and only wishing Veronica "good luck." Chandler refuses to accept Veronica's apology and drinks the drain cleaner, only to drop dead. Veronica panics, but J.D. convinces her to forge a suicide note, which paints Chandler as more complex and misunderstood. This fictionalized version of her wins everyone's sympathy and she becomes even more revered in death than she was in life ("The Me Inside of Me").

McNamara summons Veronica to a cow pasture, where she and Duke are stranded with a drunk Kurt and Ram. Upon Veronica's arrival, Duke reveals Kurt and Ram would only leave them alone if they brought Veronica, and the Heathers abandon her. Kurt and Ram unsuccessfully try to rape Veronica, though she manages to embarrass them and escape ("You’re Welcome"). The next day, Chandler's ghost appears to Veronica, warning she kept Kurt, Ram, and the other Heathers in check, and that with her gone, things would only get worse. Duke assumes Chandler's status and symbolic red scrunchie, becoming even more of a tyrant than Chandler was, while Ram and Kurt tell everyone they had a threesome with Veronica ("Never Shut Up Again"). Veronica is branded as a slut, and when J.D. attacks the jocks to defend her, they savagely beat him.

J.D. and Veronica comfort each other and plan a vengeful prank: she will lure the jocks to the cemetery with the promise of a real threesome, then together they will shoot them with ich lüge (German for I lie) tranquilizer bullets to knock them out. Then Veronica and J.D. will leave another forged suicide note confessing Ram and Kurt were gay lovers and humiliate them in front of the school. When they arrive, J.D. shoots Ram but Veronica misses Kurt. As Veronica realizes that Ram is dead and the bullets are actually real, J.D. shoots Kurt dead and proclaims his undying love to a horrified Veronica ("Our Love Is God").

=== Act Two ===
At Ram and Kurt's double funeral, a distraught Veronica reflects that they could have outgrown their immaturity ("Prom or Hell?"). Grief-stricken, Ram's Dad chastises Kurt's Dad for remaining homophobic, until the latter suddenly kisses the former, revealing their own secret love affair. Ram and Kurt are turned into martyrs to homophobia ("My Dead Gay Son"). Convinced that the murders are for the greater good, J.D. urges Veronica to target Duke next. When she refuses, he complains about doing nothing in the face of injustice. J.D. reveals he witnessed his mother's own suicide as a young boy, straining his relationship with his father and causing their constant moving around. Veronica gives him an ultimatum: give up violence and live a normal life with her or lose her forever ("Seventeen"). J.D. agrees and they reconcile. Martha tells Veronica she suspects J.D. of murdering the jocks, believing Ram's "love note" to her is proof. Veronica, urged by Chandler's ghost, confesses that she was actually the one who wrote it. Martha is heartbroken and runs off in tears.

Ms. Fleming, one of the teachers, holds a televised therapy assembly, where she attempts to convince Westerberg's students to open up about their feelings, which she believes will help decide against committing suicide, when no student comes up to "share what's in their hearts" she decides to confess her struggles to motivate them, publicly breaking up with Steve, cutting off their affair ("Shine a Light"). She urges everyone to reveal their fears and insecurities, but only McNamara comes forward; admitting to experiencing grief and suicidal thoughts after losing Kurt and Chandler, and fearing it happening to her other peers ("Lifeboat"). Duke mocks her and whips the students into a frenzy, and McNamara runs off crying. Veronica lashes out and blurts out a confession to the murders, but everyone believes she is only desperate for attention. Shortly after, McNamara tries to kill herself by overdosing on sedative pills in the bathroom, while imagining Duke taunting her in her ("Shine a Light (Reprise)"), but Veronica stops her. J.D., carrying a gun, tries to persuade Veronica to kill Duke once more. Realizing how unstable he is, Veronica breaks up with him ("I Say No").

Furious, J.D. blackmails Duke into making the student body sign a petition to support a school holiday to honor the "suicide victims". Martha, mourning Ram, tries to commit suicide by jumping off a bridge ("Kindergarten Boyfriend"), but survives. Heather Duke tells Veronica about Martha´s attempted suicide, distraught, Veronica rushes home, only to find that J.D. has told her parents she is suicidal. She hides herself in her room as she is taunted by the ghosts of Kurt, Ram, and Chandler, while J.D. breaks in through the window ("Yo Girl"). Veronica barricades herself in her closet as J.D. reveals the petition was actually a mass suicide note, and explains his plans to stage the pep rally as such—using his demolition expertise to plant a bomb in the school and reveals that the petition was actually a mass suicide note, and that by signing it, will make the entire student body appear to have committed a mass suicide. He breaks open the closet to find Veronica dangling from a noose. Grief-stricken, J.D flees to the school to enact his plan ("Meant to Be Yours").

Veronica, having faked her death, races to stop him. While the school pep rally is going on, Veronica confronts J.D in the boiler room, but in their struggle, he is shot ("Dead Girl Walking (Reprise)"). Unable to disarm the detonator, Veronica tries to carry the bomb a safe distance away. J.D. convinces her to let him take the bomb instead; it explodes, killing him ("I Am Damaged").

Returning to school, Veronica takes Chandler's scrunchie away from Duke, ending the era of social ridicule. Veronica then invites Martha, McNamara, and Duke to hang out, rent a movie, and "be seventeen" before their childhood is over ("Seventeen (Reprise)").

== Musical numbers ==
Act I

- "Beautiful" – Veronica, H. Chandler, H. McNamara, H. Duke, Kurt, Ram, Martha, Ms. Fleming and Company
- "Candy Store" – H. Chandler, H. McNamara and H. Duke
- "Fight for Me" – Veronica and Students
- "Candy Store (Reprise)" † – H. Chandler, H. McNamara and H. Duke
- "Freeze Your Brain" – J.D.
- "Big Fun" – Ram, Kurt, Veronica, H. Chandler, H. McNamara, H. Duke, Martha, and Students
- "Dead Girl Walking" – Veronica and J.D.
- "Veronica's Chandler Nightmare" † – H. Chandler and Company
- "The Me Inside of Me" – H. Chandler, Veronica, J.D., Ms. Fleming, Principal, Coach, Cops and Company
- "You're Welcome" †† – Ram, Kurt, Veronica
- "Never Shut Up Again" †† – H. Duke, Ram, Kurt and Ensemble
- "Our Love Is God" – J.D., Veronica, Ram, Kurt and Company

Act II

- "Prom or Hell?" † – Veronica
- "My Dead Gay Son" – Ram's Dad, Kurt's Dad and Mourners
- "Seventeen" – Veronica and J.D.
- "Shine a Light" – Ms. Fleming and Students
- "Lifeboat" – H. McNamara
- "Shine a Light (Reprise)" – H. Duke, H. McNamara, and Students
- "I Say No" †† – Veronica and Ensemble
- "Hey Yo, Westerberg" † – H. McNamara and Students
- "Kindergarten Boyfriend" – Martha
- "Yo Girl" – H. Duke, H. Chandler, Ram, Kurt, Veronica, Veronica’s Dad, and Veronica's Mom
- "Meant to Be Yours" – J.D. and Students
- "Dead Girl Walking (Reprise)" – Veronica, J.D., Ms. Fleming, H. McNamara, and Students
- "I Am Damaged" – J.D. and Veronica
- "Seventeen (Reprise)" – Veronica, Martha, H. McNamara, H. Duke and Company

† Not featured on any of the cast recordings.
†† Songs added to the West End version and all future productions.

"You're Welcome" replaces a song from the original Off-Broadway production titled "Blue," a comedic song where Kurt and Ram are inept due to being inebriated and instead sing about having "blue balls". While both songs depict Veronica escaping from Kurt and Ram attempting to date rape her, "Blue" has a more comedic tone. O'Keefe and Murphy preferred "You're Welcome" to "Blue" as it had been perceived by audiences as "treating date rape as a laughing matter" and trivializing the issue by presenting it as comical, "boyish antics." Starting in the 2018 London production, "You're Welcome" and "You're Welcome (Reprise)" were part of the official adult production. When asked to comment on the choice to replace the track, O'Keefe and Murphy stated that "'You're Welcome' doesn't shy away from showing that Veronica is in real danger from these two drunk football assholes."

A new song for Heather Duke, "Never Shut Up Again", was added to the London run in 2019, replacing "You're Welcome (Reprise)". For the 2017 workshop, there was a different song to replace "Blue (Reprise)", "Big Fun (Reprise)", part of which is now included in "Never Shut Up Again." In the last week at The Other Palace, the authors added a new song after "Shine a Light (Reprise)" called "I Say No", in which Veronica stands up to and breaks up with J.D. after an argument. The song remained in the show for the Haymarket run and was released on February 15, 2019, as the first single on the West End cast album.

The additional songs from the London version were included in the 2025 re-release of the original cast recording, featuring new recordings performed by American actors: "You're Welcome" performed by Jason Gotay, Corey Cott, and Alyse Alan Louis; "Never Shut Up Again" performed by Adrianna Hicks; "I Say No" performed by Leslie Kritzer; and the cut song "One By One", performed by Ingrid Michaelson and Gizel Jiménez.

== Background ==
Andy Cohen and J. Todd Harris secured the rights from Daniel Waters (the screenwriter of the film) and immediately thought of Andy Fickman to direct. After seeing Laurence O'Keefe's work with Legally Blonde and how he transitioned film to theatre, he decided to pair him with Reefer Madness collaborator Kevin Murphy. Originally, lyricist Amy Powers was on the creative team, but she transitioned to joining producers Cohen and Harris. Fickman, Murphy and O'Keefe were also producers on the original productions in Los Angeles and New York. Fickman said of the experience, "we found that Heathers gave a great deal of opportunity for '80s commentary and a great chance for music and storytelling."

== Development (2009–10) ==
Three private readings of the work in progress were held in Los Angeles in 2009, each starring Kristen Bell as Veronica. The first was in March at the Beverly Hills offices of Endeavor Agency (starring Christian Campbell as J.D.); the second in June at the Hudson Theatre on Santa Monica Boulevard (starring Scott Porter as J.D.); and the third in December at the Coast Theatre in West Hollywood, starring James Snyder as J.D. In each reading, Jenna Leigh Green, Corri English, and Christine Lakin played Heather Chandler, Heather McNamara and Heather Duke, respectively.

On September 13–14, 2010, Heathers was presented as a concert at Joe's Pub. The show was directed by Andy Fickman, and it starred Annaleigh Ashford as Veronica Sawyer, Jeremy Jordan as Jason Dean, Jenna Leigh Green as Heather Chandler, Corri English as Heather McNamara, and Christine Lakin as Heather Duke, James Snyder as Kurt Kelly, PJ Griffith as Ram Sweeney, and Julie Garnyé as Martha "Dumptruck" Dunnstock.

== Productions ==
=== Los Angeles (2013) ===
Heathers: The Musical played at the Hudson Backstage Theatre in Los Angeles for a limited engagement on the weekends from September 21, 2013, to October 6, 2013. The cast included Barrett Wilbert Weed as Veronica, Ryan McCartan as J.D., Sarah Halford as Heather Chandler, Kristolyn Lloyd as Heather Duke, and Elle McLemore as Heather McNamara. The production was music directed by Ryan Shore.

=== Off-Broadway (2014) ===
The musical next played off-Broadway, with previews beginning in March at New World Stages, directed by Andy Fickman. Coincidentally, New World is also the name of the original film's distributor. The cast included Barrett Wilbert Weed, Ryan McCartan, and Elle McLemore reprising their roles as Veronica, J.D., and Heather McNamara, respectively, with new additions being Jessica Keenan Wynn as Heather Chandler, Alice Lee as Heather Duke and Tony Award winner Anthony Crivello as Bill Sweeney/'Big Bud' Dean. The show began previews on March 15, 2014, and opened on March 31, 2014.

The original cast album was recorded on April 15–16, 2014, with an in-store and digital release of June 17, 2014. It was released a week early on June 10, 2014.

The production played its final performance on August 4, 2014. According to star Ryan McCartan, the original goal of the Heathers production team was to eventually create a film adaptation of the musical, with McCartan signing on to the L.A. and New York productions with the promise of reprising his role in the film. For numerous reasons, a film adaptation never emerged.

=== Australia (2015) ===
An Australian production of Heathers: The Musical at the Hayes Theatre in Sydney was staged in July–August 2015. Directed by Trevor Ashley, the cast included Stephen Madsen as J.D. and Lucy Maunder as Heather Chandler. The production transferred the following year, with mostly the same cast, for seasons in Brisbane (Playhouse, Queensland Performing Arts Centre) in January 2016, Melbourne (Playhouse, Arts Centre Melbourne) in May 2016, and the Sydney Opera House's Playhouse in June 2016.

=== London/West End productions and UK tours (2018–2024, 2026–2027) ===
A workshop of the musical at The Other Palace, London, held five presentations in the Studio from May 30 to June 3, 2017. The workshop featured Charlotte Wakefield as Veronica Sawyer and Jamie Muscato as J.D.

The show had its official London premiere in the Theatre at The Other Palace from June 9 to August 4, 2018, starring Carrie Hope Fletcher as Veronica Sawyer and Jamie Muscato as J.D. The production is produced by Bill Kenwright and Paul Taylor-Mills, directed again by Andy Fickman and with choreographer/associate director Gary Lloyd. For the London production "Blue" has been changed to the new song "You're Welcome" and Heather Duke has received her own song "Never Shut Up Again" as well as a few script changes.

Heathers transferred to the West End at the Theatre Royal Haymarket, running from September 3, 2018, to November 24, 2018. A new song for Veronica, "I Say No", as well as a few script changes to Act 2 were added for the transfer. A West End cast recording was released on Ghostlight Records on March 1. The album reached number 24 on the UK Albums Chart in March 2019.

The production won the 2019 WhatsOnStage Award for Best New Musical. Carrie Hope Fletcher also won for Best Actress in a Musical.

A UK and Ireland tour expected in 2020 was postponed until 2021 due to the coronavirus pandemic.

The musical returned to the West End with performances beginning on June 21, 2021, and ran at the Theatre Royal Haymarket until September 11, 2021. The cast included Jodie Steele reprising her role as Heather Chandler. The tour opened in Leeds on August 5, 2021, and finished in Edinburgh.

The production then opened at The Other Palace in London in November 2021, following Bill Kenwright Ltd's acquisition of the venue. After several extensions to the run, its final performance was on September 3, 2023, at The Other Palace. The revival was filmed in May 2022 at The Other Palace and was released on The Roku Channel in the US September 16, 2022. The cast featured Ailsa Davidson as Veronica, Simon Gordon as J.D., Maddison Firth as Heather Chandler, Vivian Panka as Heather Duke, Teleri Hughes as Heather McNamara, Vicki Lee Taylor as Ms. Fleming/Veronica's Mom, Mhairi Angus as Martha, Liam Doyle as Kurt, Rory Phelan as Ram, Oliver Brooks as Kurt's Dad/Big Bud Dean/Coach Ripper, and Andy Brady as Ram's Dad/Principle Gowan/Veronica's Dad. During this run, ensemble member Hannah Lowther became the first person to play all three Heathers in any production of the show after she had to emergency cover Heather Duke due to cast illness, with only 4-hour notice and 30-minute rehearsal prior to her debut.

The show toured the UK & Ireland in 2023. It opened in Windsor on February 14, 2023, before finishing in Wimbledon on October 28, 2023. Ensemble member Lizzie Emery also made history in the show by becoming the first person to play all three Heathers and Veronica Sawyer.

The show returned to the West End from May 22 to July 6, 2024, at @sohoplace, before embarking on a UK tour starting at Theatre Royal Windsor on July 24 and ending at Cambridge Arts Theatre in November 2024.

Heathers: The Musical returned to London in 2026 for a limited engagement of 52 performances, running from July 9 to August 22 at the Arts at Marble Arch, a temporary venue serving as the Arts Theatre's home during renovations to its permanent building. Andy Fickman returned as director, with choreography again by Gary Lloyd. The run has been followed by a UK and Ireland tour beginning in autumn 2026 and continuing into spring 2027.

=== Off-Broadway revival (2025) ===
An off-Broadway revival began previews at New World Stages in June 2025. Fickman is again directing. Lorna Courtney and Casey Likes star respectively as Veronica Sawyer and Jason Dean, with McKenzie Kurtz, Elizabeth Teeter, and Olivia Hardy as the Heathers. The show opened on July 10, 2025. The production was first coined as a limited engagement to close on September 28, 2025, but 5 days after starting previews, it was first extended to January 25, 2026. A second extension was announced for a May 24 closing date, along with a third announced at the 250th performance,, and on June 25, 2026, the first anniversary of starting previews, it was announced that the production would have its fourth and final extension, closing on November 8, 2026, however the original closing date was brought a month forward to October 11, 2026, for unspecificed reasons. Kuhoo Verma replaced Courtney as Veronica Sawyer and Jackera Davis assumed the role of Heather Duke beginning December 11, 2025. Following Kurtz's departure and original West End cast member Jodie Steele reprising her role as Heather Chandler, Peyton List joined the cast as Heather Chandler on January 26, 2026. Isabella Esler, Zan Berube, John Cardoza and Lisa Ann Walter joined the cast as Veronica, Chandler, J.D., and Ms. Fleming respectively in April 2026. Notable final additions to the show were Morgan Dudley and Anneliese van der Pol who joined the cast as Heather Duke and Ms. Fleming in September 2026.

=== Australia and NZ (2026) ===
Heathers: The Musical returned to Australia in 2026, opening in Playhouse (Arts Centre Melbourne) on April 8, the same theatre it played in 10 years prior. The tour will continue to New Zealand, visiting Christchurch (James Hay Theatre) from May 15, Wellington (The Opera House) from May 28, and Auckland (The Civic) from June 10. The tour will then return to Australia, continuing to Adelaide (Her Majesty's Theatre) from July 16, Gold Coast (HOTA) from July 30, Canberra (Canberra Theatre Centre) from August 14, Sydney (Coliseum Theatre and Roslyn Packer Theatre) from August 26, and Perth (Regal Theatre) from September 30.

The tour uses the West End revival version of the script including the new songs and is performed by an Australian and Kiwi touring cast. Veronica is played by Emma Caporaso, Jason Dean is played by Conor Beaumont, Heather Chandler is played by Calista Nelmes, Heather Duke is played by Amélia Rojas, and Heather McNamara is played by Abigail Sharp.

=== North American Tour (2027) ===
A North American national tour is planned to launch, starting at the Hippodrome Theatre in Baltimore in May 2027. The tour has confirmed performances so far in New Haven, Chicago, Charlotte, Greenville, and Hershey.

=== Other productions ===
- A German-language version of the show premiered in Berlin in 2019.
- A Brazilian production was staged at the Viradalata Theatre in São Paulo in October–November 2019. The production planned to return in May–June 2020 but was cancelled due to the COVID-19 pandemic.
- In May 2021, Ram's Head Theatrical Society at Stanford University debuted a gender-bent production featuring Emily Saletan portraying Janie "J.D." Dean. While non-male actors had previously played the male character of J.D., this was the first production for which the original authors rewrote an official script with a female J.D.
- An Argentinian production opened at the Teatro Opera in Buenos Aires on July 1, 2023, and closed on July 30, 2023.
- A Polish non-replica production based on the West End production opened on September 7, 2024, in Teatr Syrena in Warsaw, directed by Agnieszka Płoszajska.
- A Romanian production with the title Iubirea Noastră i Raiul (Our Love is God) was staged at the acting school Victory of Art in Bucharest, with the roles being played by the school's senior company (students aged 14 to 18). It has been running since June 9, 2024, in Sala Gloria. The director is Theodor Andrei, the Romanian representative of Eurovision Song Contest 2023, the roles of J.D and Veronica being played by Raul Rizoiu, respectively Iarina Preda. The production came to a close on February 23, 2026.

== Cast ==
Character	Joe's Pub	Los Angeles	Off-Broadway	Australia		Off-West End	West End	Berlin	West End Revival	UK Tour	Off-West End Revival	2022 Proshot	UK & Ireland Tour	West End Revival	UK Tour	Poland	Off-Broadway Revival	Australia & NZ Tour	West End Revival	UK Tour
Character	2010	2013	2014	2015	2016	2018			2021		2022		2023	2024			2025	2026		
Veronica Sawyer	Annaleigh Ashford	Barrett Wilbert Weed	Barrett Wilbert Weed	Jaz Flowers	Hilary Cole	Carrie Hope Fletcher	Carrie Hope Fletcher	Michelle Hoffmann	Christina Bennington	Rebecca Wickes	Ailsa Davidson	Ailsa Davidson	Jenna Innes	Jenna Innes	Jenna Innes	Natalia Kujawa	Lorna Courtney	Emma Caporaso	Gerardine Sacdalan	Gerardine Sacdalan
Jason "J.D." Dean	Jeremy Jordan	Ryan McCartan	Ryan McCartan	Stephen Madsen	Stephen Madsen	Jamie Muscato	Jamie Muscato	Kevin Kolodziej	Jordan Luke Gage	Simon Gordon	Freddie King	Simon Gordon	Jacob Fowler	Keelan McAuley	Keelan McAuley	Maciej M. Tomaszewski	Casey Likes	Conor Beaumont	Louis Hearsey	Louis Hearsey
Heather Chandler	Jenna Leigh Green	Sarah Halford	Jessica Keenan Wynn	Lucy Maunder	Lucy Maunder	Jodie Steele	Jodie Steele	Franziska Wiethan	Jodie Steele	Maddison Firth	Emma Kingston	Maddison Firth	Verity Thompson	Esme Bowdler	Esme Bowdler	Aleksandra Gotowicka	McKenzie Kurtz	Calista Nelmes	Liberty Stottor	Liberty Stottor
Heather McNamara	Corri English	Elle McLemore	Elle McLemore	Erin Clare	Rebecca Hetherington	Sophie Isaacs	Sophie Isaacs	Irina Deuble	Frances Mayli McCann	Lizzy Parker	Teleri Hughes	Teleri Hughes	Billie Bowman	Daisy Twells	Daisy Twells	Karolina Gwóźdź	Elizabeth Teeter	Abigail Sharp	Lou Henry	Lou Henry
Heather Duke	Christine Lakin	Kristolyn Lloyd	Alice Lee	Libby Asciak	Hannah Fredericksen	T'Shan Williams	T'Shan Williams	Nina Knoll	Bobbie Little	Merryl Ansah	Inez Budd	Vivian Panka	Elise Zavou	Sedona Sky	Sedona Sky	Joanna Gorzała	Olivia Hardy	Amélia Rojas	Jessica Ibadin	Jessica Ibadin
Martha Dunnstock	Julie Garnyé	Katie Ladner	Katie Ladner	Lauren McKenna	Lauren McKenna	Jenny O’Leary	Jenny O’Leary	Julia Spang	Madison Swan	Mhairi Angus	Lizzie Bea	Mhairi Angus	Kingsley Morton	Amy Miles	Amy Miles	Marta Burdynowicz	Erin Morton	Mel O'Brien	Sophie Manners	Sophie Manners
Ram Sweeney	PJ Griffith	Jon Eidson	Jon Eidson	Vincent Hooper	Vincent Hooper	Dominic Andersen	Dominic Andersen	Matthias Busch	Joaquin Pedro Valdes	Rory Phelan	Tom Scanlon	Rory Phelan	Morgan Jackson	Jason Battersby	Jason Battersby	Jędrzej Czerwonogrodzki	Xavier McKinnon	David Cuny	Beau Jackson	Beau Jackson
Kurt Kelly	James Snyder	Evan Todd	Evan Todd	Jakob Ambrose	Jakob Ambrose	Chris Chung	Chris Chung	Sven Edthofer	Ross Harmon	Liam Doyle	George Maddison	Liam Doyle	Alex Woodward	Iván Fernández González	Iván Fernández González	Karol Ledwosiński	Cade Ostermeyer	Nic Van Lits	Markus Södergren	Markus Södergren
Bill Sweeney (Note: Can be portrayed by actor who portrays other adult male roles.) / Big Bud Dean / Coach Ripper	Eric Leviton	Rex Smith	Anthony Crivello	Vincent Hooper	Vincent Hooper	Edward Baruwa	Nathan Amzi	Matthias Busch	Simon Bailey	Kurt Kansley	Kieran Brown	Oliver Brooks	Conor McFarlane	Conor McFarlane	Conor McFarlane	Michał Konarski	Ben Davis	Ellis Dolan	John GurdÍan	John GurdÍan
Paul Kelly / Mr. Sawyer / Principal Gowan	Kevin Pariseau	Zachary Ford	Daniel Cooney	Jakob Ambrose	Jakob Ambrose	Jon Boydon	Jon Boydon	Sven Edthofer	Steven Serlin	Andy Brady	Sam Ferriday	Andy Brady	Jay Bryce	Alexander Service	Alexander Service	Albert Osik	Cameron Loyal	Brodie Masini	Reuben Browne	Reuben Browne
Ms. Fleming / Mrs. Sawyer	Jill Abramovitz	Rena Strober	Michelle Duffy	Michelle Barr	Lauren McKenna	Rebecca Lock	Rebecca Lock	Christine Milo	Lauren Ward	Georgina Hagen	Vicki Lee Taylor	Vicki Lee Taylor	Katie Paine	Lucy Sinclair	Lucy Sinclair	Agnieszka Rose	Kerry Butler	Zoe Gertz	Veronica Carabai	Veronica Carabai

=== Notable Replacements ===
2025 Off-Broadway revival

- Veronica Sawyer: Kuhoo Verma, Isabella Esler
- Jason "J.D." Dean: John Cardoza
- Heather Chandler: Jodie Steele, Peyton List, Zan Berube
- Heather Duke: Jackera Davis, Morgan Dudley
- Heather McNamara: Ava DeMary
- Ram's Dad / Big Bud Dean / Coach Ripper: Adam Bashian, Jimmy Ray Bennett
- Kurt's Dad / Veronica's Dad / Principal Gowan: Jimmy Ray Bennett
- Ms. Fleming/Veronica's Mom: Kate Rockwell, Lisa Ann Walter, Jenette Bayardelle, Anneliese Van Der Pol

== Critical reception ==
=== Off-Broadway ===
Heathers: The Musical's 2014 Off-Broadway production was generally received well by critics and audiences alike. The musical was praised for staying true to the film while still having its own original additions to the storyline. The score and choreography of the musical were also given praise.

The musical, however, was criticized for the length and its characters not living up to the cast of the original movie. It has also been criticized for taking the dark themes of the source material and sanitizing them with bubbly music and cartoon-like characters.

Marilyn Stasio, writing for Variety, wrote, "[S]easoned industry pros could pick up a few tips on the Do's and Don'ts of adapting material from this smartly executed musical treatment of 'Heathers.'" She praised the lyrics but was not a fan of the music, writing: "Even at their giddiest, the lyrics never dumb down the characters singing them. Wish we could say the same for the music, which is brassy and blah and sounds nothing like the music that made the 80s."

The Hollywood Reporter's David Rooney stated: "Does the acidic comedy gain anything from being turned into a cartoonish pop musical? Hell, no. But as an extension of the movie's wicked pleasures, this version has its silly charms, as demonstrated by the rowdy response of the predominantly young audience. It's not exactly very — to borrow from Heather-speak — but for insatiable fans it might almost be enough, and the tacky high school-style staging seems somehow appropriate."

The musical got two out of five stars from The Guardian's Alexis Soloski, who wrote: "The off-Broadway adaptation of the 1988 Winona Ryder/Christian Slater teen movie is sunny and snarky, but the dark subject matter calls for something more wicked." Elisabeth Vincentelli of the New York Post gave it four out of five stars, writing "The first act moves briskly as director Andy Fickman and his cast wring every last comic drop out of the script and songs... The production nearly derails in Act II, having killed off its antagonists. The film had the same problem, but here the sweetened worldview saps the grand finale of its effectiveness. Still, seeing 'Heathers' onstage is a joy."

Kyle Anderson of Entertainment Weekly was harsher, giving the musical a C− rating: "Heathers: The Musical misses just about everything that made the film great, making it not only a colossally disappointing adaptation of a beloved property but also a generally unpleasant theater experience."

=== West End ===
The London production received generally favourable reception. However, some critics felt that complex issues such as homosexuality, bulimia and suicide were made light of for comedic effect, making parts of the show feel "dated and uncomfortable for a 2018 audience."

== Awards and nominations ==
=== Original Off-Broadway production ===
Year	Award Ceremony	Category	Nominee	Result
2014	Drama Desk Awards	Outstanding Music	Laurence O'Keefe and Kevin Murphy	Nominated
2014	Drama Desk Awards	Outstanding Actress in a Musical	Barrett Wilbert Weed	Nominated
2014	Lucille Lortel Awards	Outstanding Lead Actress in a Musical	Barrett Wilbert Weed	Nominated
2014	Lucille Lortel Awards	Outstanding Choreographer	Marguerite Derricks	Nominated

=== Original West End production ===
Year	Award Ceremony	Category	Nominee	Result
2019	WhatsOnStage Awards	Best New Musical		Won
2019	WhatsOnStage Awards	Best Actor in a Musical	Jamie Muscato	Nominated
2019	WhatsOnStage Awards	Best Actress in a Musical	Carrie Hope Fletcher	Won
2019	WhatsOnStage Awards	Best Supporting Actress in a Musical	Jodie Steele	Nominated
2019	WhatsOnStage Awards	Best Direction	Andy Fickman	Nominated
2019	WhatsOnStage Awards	Best Lighting Design	Ben Cracknell	Nominated

=== 2025 Off-Broadway revival ===
Year	Award	Category	Work	Result	Ref.
2026	Drama League Award	Outstanding Revival of a Musical		Nominated	
2026	Lucille Lortel Award	Outstanding Featured Performer in a Musical	Erin Morton	Nominated	
2026	Drama Desk Awards	Outstanding Featured Performer in a Musical	Erin Morton	Nominated	

== Heathers: The Musical (Teen Edition) ==
Following its 2014 Off-Broadway run, the musical gained a cult following, and high schools requested licensing rights; accordingly, an abridged "PG-13" version was prepared, revised by writers Laurence O’Keefe and Kevin Murphy, iTheatrics, and licensing company Samuel French for student productions. Most of the profanity in the show was deleted, "Big Fun", "Dead Girl Walking", and the majority of the songs received rewritten lyrics and one new song, "You're Welcome" was written for the show to replace "Blue". O'Keefe and Murphy have stated that they prefer "You're Welcome" to "Blue", and the change was officially made for the London production of Heathers in June 2018 and all further licensed productions.

The first performance of Heathers: The Musical (Teen Edition) took place on September 15, 2016, at Pearce Theatre, J.J. Pearce High School, Richardson, Texas. A Brazilian version, "Heathers – A Teen Musical" was set to open in 2020 at the Stunt Burger, but because of the COVID-19 pandemic it made some changes.

== In popular culture ==
In 2019, a high school production of the musical was the focus of the "Chapter Fifty-One: Big Fun" episode of Riverdale. The Riverdale cast album of the musical was produced via WaterTower Music. The lyrics from the songs in the episode are from the Teen Edition of the musical with most of the profanity deleted.
