= Richard Arnold and William Critchard =

English gay couple executed in 1753

Richard Arnold and William Critchard were a homosexual couple who were executed in Bristol in 1753.

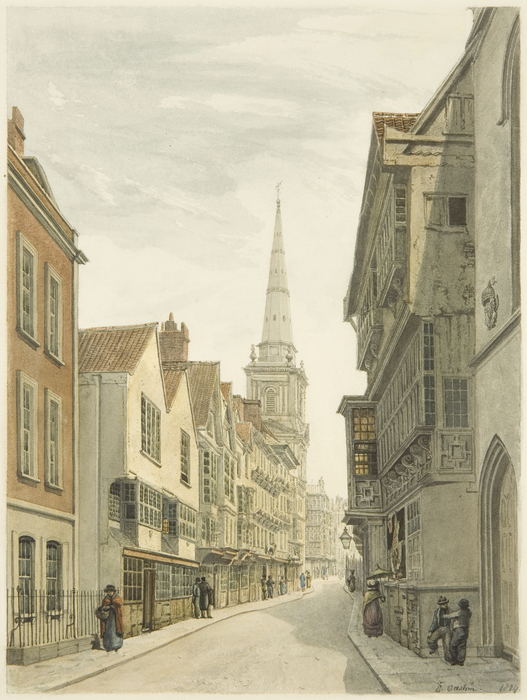
Broad Street, Bristol, in 1824.

== Background ==
Richard Arnold, reportedly nearly 60 years of age at the time, and William Critchard, also written as Crutchard, whose age is estimated at 20–24 at the time, were both in a same-sex relationship.

Arnold was originally from London and the landlord of the Lamb and Flag pub in Temple Street and was described as a man who “lived in good repute”.

In late August 1752 the two men were reported, by witnesses and spied upon by the landlord, to have been seen entering a room together after ordering a pint of ale and having sex in a room in The Swan Alehouse in Broad Street, Bristol.

The statement of John Baber claims that he saw Arnold and Critchard enter a private room and “shut the door, but this informant having some suspicion of their being about some indecent practices looked privately into the said room where he observed both their breeches down” and reported that they “kissed eagerly”.

== The Execution ==
The two men were sentenced to hanging in September 1753. The execution took place at St Michael’s Hill, Arnold and Critchard reportedly behaved in a “very decent manner” but refused to name accomplices and stated they already “confessed their guilt to God, and therefore felt it unnecessary to repeat it to Men.”It’s reported that during the execution, they were stood upon a cart, and witness accounts describe that just before the cart was moved, Arnold held Critchard’s hand and kissed it:

“When the Cart drew under the Gallows, Arnold kissed Crutchard's Hand; and after a few private Ejaculations, they gave a Signal, by throwing the Tufts of Flowers from them, and the Cart drew away, soon launching them into Eternity."

== Legacy ==
Arnold and Critchard were buried in separate Chuchyards, Arnold was buried on September 13 1753 at Bristol Temple Church, and Crutchard buried on the day after at the Church of St John The Baptist in Bedminster.
