= George Maguire (actor, born 1985) =

English actor and musician

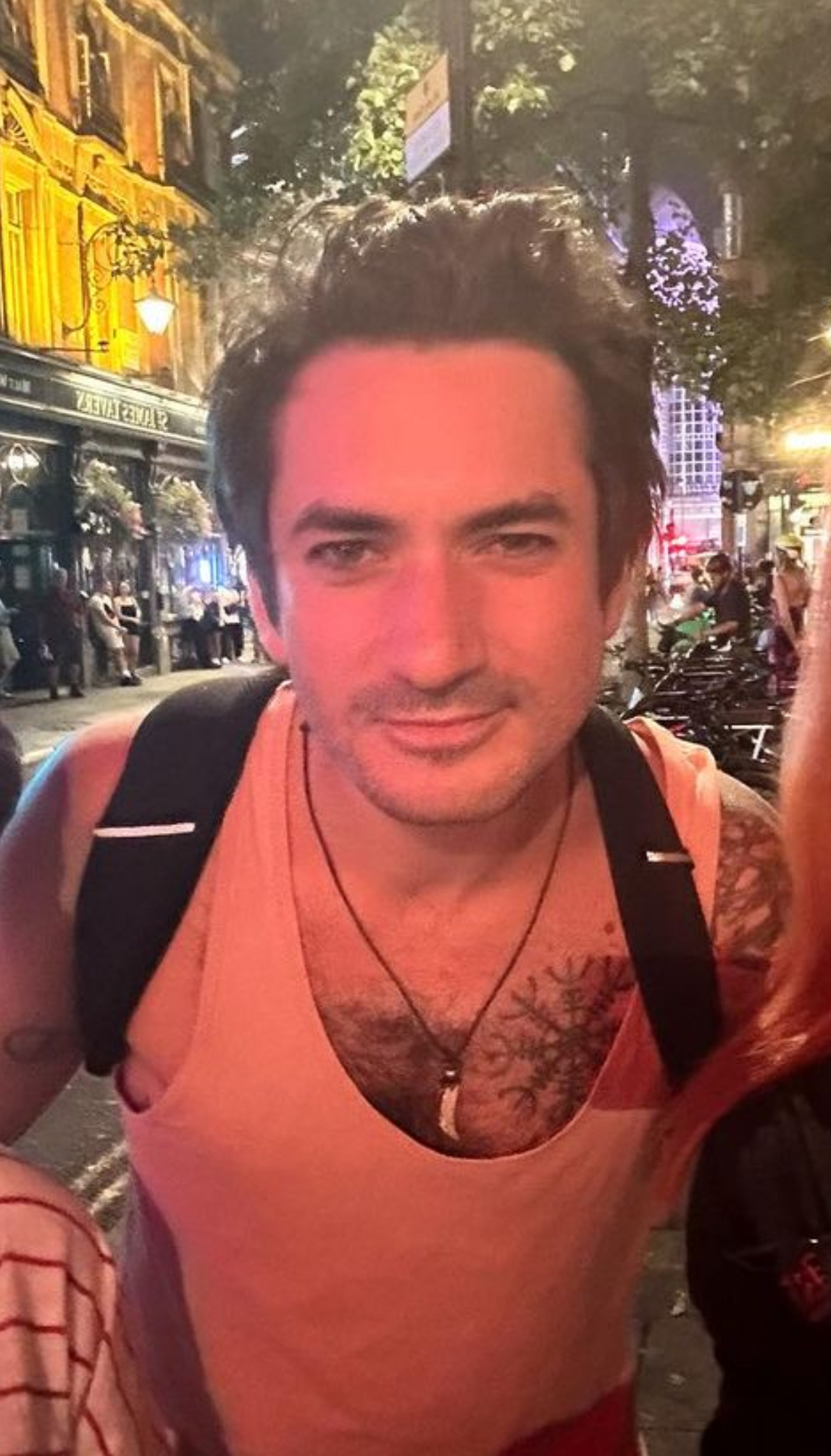
- Maguire in 2023
- Born: 17 January 1985 (age 41); Guildford, England
- Education: Italia Conti Academy of Theatre Arts
- Occupations: Actor; musician
- Years active: 1998–present
- Spouse: Rachael Wooding (m. July 2022)

George Maguire (born 17 January 1985) is an English actor and musician, known for originating the role of Dave Davies in the musical Sunny Afternoon.

== Career ==
Maguire made his first appearance on stage, aged 9, in a small role in a pantomime production of Robin Hood and the Babes in the Wood at Guildford Civic Hall. When he was 10, he attended an open audition that landed him his West End debut in Oliver! at the Palladium.

While still appearing in Oliver! he began to attend Italia Conti Academy of Theatre Arts. During his time there he saw the first London production of Rent which proved a great inspiration for him. "It was raw, rocky and real and I remember thinking 'that's the kind of stuff I want to do'." In 2011, Maguire appeared as Richard Loeb in Thrill Me, first at the Tristan Bates Theatre in London and then at the Charing Cross Theatre. This was followed by his first of two stints as 1970s glam rock star Marc Bolan in 20th Century Boy which premiered at the New Wolsey Theatre in Ipswich in September 2011.

A planned tour of Hair with Maguire taking the lead role of Berger was cancelled with the exception of a two-week engagement at Deutsches Theater in Munich. A few months later, in July 2012, there was a one-off charity performance of this production at the Piccadilly Theatre in London in aid of Help for Heroes which featured Oliver Tobias, who portrayed Berger at the first London production of Hair in 1968. In September of the same year, George returned to 20th Century Boy, this time performing at Belgrade Theatre in Coventry. Early 2013 saw Maguire appear in a production called Lift, where he played a Busker, looking for cash and for the woman that always walks past him smiling every morning. Maguire said about the production: "I have always been passionate about new writing and love the chance to originate a role." Maguire then played Dave Davies in the Kinks musical, Sunny Afternoon, on which he commented: "It's quite rare and special to be able to see a piece through from the beginning." The show opened at the Hampstead Theatre in April 2014 and after a sold-out run of 6 weeks, transferred to the West End's Harold Pinter Theatre where it ran for two years. Maguire left the show in early October 2015. In April 2015, George Maguire won the Laurence Olivier Award for Best Supporting Actor in Sunny Afternoon, the musical simultaneously picking up three further awards, including Best New Musical.

In 2017, Maguire appeared as a guest character in the BBC One soap opera EastEnders as Felix Moore. Then in April 2020, he appeared in an episode of the BBC daytime soap opera Doctors as Greg Taylor-Smith.

In 2021, Maguire filmed the feature film adaptation of the musical Tomorrow Morning based on the stage show by Laurence Mark Wythe, directed by Nick Winston.

More recently, as well as continuing his acting Career, he has been teaching at Stageworks College in St Neots.

== Stage ==
Year(s)	Production	Role	Theatre
1995	Oliver!	Captain	Palladium West End
2001	Quadrophenia	Jimmy	Nuffield Theatre Southampton
2006	Tonight's the Night	Stuart Clutterbuck (understudy)	UK Tour
2006	Rent	Angel	European Tour
2007	Fame	Joe Vegas	Shaftesbury Theatre West End
2009	Quadrophenia	Jimmy Tough Guy	UK Tour
2010	Bright Lights, Big City	Tad	Hoxton Hall London
2011	Thrill Me	Richard Loeb	Charing Cross Theatre West End/Tristan Bates Theatre London
2011	20th Century Boy	Marc Bolan	New Wolsey Theatre Ipswich
2012	Hair	Berger	Deutsches Theater Munich
2012	20th Century Boy	Marc Bolan	Belgrade Theatre Coventry
2013	Lift	Busker	Soho Theatre West End
2014–2015	Sunny Afternoon	Dave Davies	Hampstead Theatre London/Harold Pinter Theatre West End
2016	The Buskers Opera	Macheath	Park Theatre London
2016	Another Night Before Christmas	The Guy	Bridge House Theatre London
2017	35mm	Man 3	The Other Palace (studio) London
2018	20th Century Boy	Marc Bolan	UK Tour
2022	Bonnie & Clyde	Buck Barrow	Arts Theatre
2023	Bonnie & Clyde	Buck Barrow	Garrick Theatre
2024-2025	Burlesque	Vince	Manchester Opera House/Theatre Royal/Savoy Theatre
2026	Midnight	Sylvester	Sadler's Wells East, London

== Filmography ==
Year	Title	Role
1998	Killer Net	Ben
2008	Boogeyman 3	Jeremy
2009	Terror and Utopia	St. Just
2010	Spiderhole	Toby
2011	Summer in Transylvania	Ronnie Mutant
2014	Borgia	Ferrante d'Este
2015	Violet City	Zeb Cartwright
2017	Prime Suspect 1973	Duke
2017	EastEnders	Felix Moore
2020	Doctors	Greg Taylor-Smith
2021	Tomorrow Morning	Nick
