= Frances Mayli McCann =

Scottish actress

- Born: Bishopbriggs, Scotland
- Occupation: Actress
- Years active: 2009–present
- Spouse: Christopher Chung

Frances Mayli McCann is a Scottish actress. Known for her work in theatre, she is the recipient of Laurence Olivier and WhatsOnStage Award nominations. Her roles include Bonnie Parker in Bonnie & Clyde and Daisy Buchanan in The Great Gatsby.

== Early life and education ==
Frances Mayli McCann was born and raised in Bishopbriggs, a suburb of Glasgow, Scotland, to a Hong Kong mother and a Scottish-Irish father. She was a dancer and gymnast from the age of four.

She attended Turnbull High School. After discovering acting and singing, she auditioned for and joined the Glasgow Academy Musical Theatre Arts (now GPRO), graduating in 2009.

== Career ==
McCann first appeared on television in the 2000s CBBC series Against All Odds as Melissa and the BBC Scotland soap opera River City as Mia. She was also a finalist on CITV's Britannia High. In 2009, she was cast in a tour of the music show Highland Heartbeat. She guest starred in a 2010 episode of the BBC Three series Lip Service.

In 2011, McCann made her West End debut as a diva in Priscilla, Queen of the Desert at the Palace Theatre. She returned to Priscilla, Queen of the Desert for its 2013 tour around the UK, this time as Cynthia.

McCann originated the role of Kylah in Our Ladies of Perpetual Succour, a stage adaptation of Alan Warner's novel The Sopranos in the play's 2015 Edinburgh Fringe Festival premiere. She took the character on tour later that year, to the National Theatre in 2016, and to the West End at the Duke of York's Theatre in 2017. McCann and the rest of the cast were jointly nominated for the Laurence Olivier Award for Best Actress in a Supporting Role.

In 2019, McCann had a recurring role as Niki in the fifth series of Shetland on BBC One. She also had a small role in Evita at the Regent's Park Open Air Theatre. She began playing Éponine on a tour of Les Misérables, but it was cut short due to the COVID-19 pandemic. In 2021, McCann appeared in the world premiere of Fantastically Great Women Who Changed the World at MAST Mayflower Studios in Southampton, as well as productions at the Royal Court and Almeida Theatre, and played Heather McNamara in the West End revival of Heathers: The Musical at the Theatre Royal Haymarket.

In February 2022, it was announced McCann would star as the titular Bonnie Parker in the original West End cast of Bonnie & Clyde opposite Jordan Luke Gage as Clyde Barrow. The show's original run took place in spring 2022 at the Arts Theatre. For her performance, McCann was nominated for a WhatsOnStage Award. Bonnie & Clyde would return to the West End in March 2023 at the Garrick Theatre with McCann and Gage reprising their roles. Also in 2023, McCann appeared in the second series of the CBBC tween science fiction series Silverpoint, played Misa in the London Palladium concert staging of Death Note: The Musical, and returned to River City in the role of Chloe Qi-Lewis.

In February 2025, it was announced she'd star as Daisy Buchanan opposite Jamie Muscato in the European premiere of The Great Gatsby at the London Coliseum.

== Personal life ==
McCann married Australian actor Christopher Chung in a traditional Chinese ceremony in Melbourne in 2020, followed by a western wedding at Bothy Glasgow in 2021.

== Filmography ==
Year	Title	Role	Notes
200?	Against All Odds	Melissa	
200?	River City	Mia	
2010	Lip Service	Shona	1 episode
2019	Shetland	Niki	5 episodes (series 5)
2020	A Tale to Tell	Sleeping Beauty	Short film
2023	Silverpoint	Charlotte	Recurring role (series 2)
2023–2025	River City	Chloe Qi-Lewis	
2024	Bonnie & Clyde: The Musical - Recorded Live on Stage	Bonnie Parker	Filmed version of concert production at Theatre Royal Drury Lane
2024	Sister Boniface Mysteries	Sylvia Melbury	Episode: "How to Murder a Tune"

== Stage ==
Year	Title	Role	Notes
2009	Highland Heartbeat		Tour
2009–2010	Aladdin	Princess Jasmine	King's Theatre, Glasgow
2011	Priscilla, Queen of the Desert	Diva	Palace Theatre, London
2012	I Dreamed a Dream	Nurse	Theatre Royal, Newcastle
2013–2014	Priscilla, Queen of the Desert	Cynthia	UK tour
2014	Here Lies Love	Soloist	National Theatre, London
2015	Little Shop of Horrors	Audrey (cover)	Salisbury Playhouse, Salisbury
2015–2017	Our Ladies of Perpetual Succour	Kylah	Edinburgh Fringe Festival / UK tour / National Theatre / Duke of York's Theatre, London
2015–2016	Snow White and the Seven Dwarfs	Snow White	King's Theatre, Edinburgh
2018	The Great Wave	Hana	National Theatre, London
2018	Macbeth	Gentlewoman	National Theatre, London
2019	Evita	Péron's Mistress	Regent's Park Open Air Theatre, London
2019–2020	Les Misérables	Éponine	UK tour
2020	Les Misérables	Ensemble u/s Éponine	Sondheim Theatre, London
2021	Living Newspaper		Royal Court Theatre, London
2021	Heathers: The Musical	Heather McNamara	Theatre Royal Haymarket, London
2021	Fantastically Great Women Who Changed the World	Emmeline Pankhurst / Agent Fifi / Miss Johnson	MAST Mayflower Studios, Southampton
2022–2023	Bonnie & Clyde	Bonnie Parker	Theatre Royal, Drury Lane / Arts Theatre / Garrick Theatre, London
2022	Chess	Svetlana	Theatre Royal, Drury Lane
2023	Death Note: The Musical	Misa Amane	Concert; London Palladium
2023	Peter Pan	Wendy Darling	Concert; London Palladium
2025	The Great Gatsby	Daisy Buchanan	London Coliseum

== Awards and nominations ==
Year	Award	Category	Work	Result	Ref.
2017	Laurence Olivier Awards	Best Actress in a Supporting Role	Our Ladies of Perpetual Succour	Nominated	
2023	WhatsOnStage Awards	Best Performer in a Musical	Bonnie & Clyde	Nominated	
