= Jamie Muscato =

English actor and singer

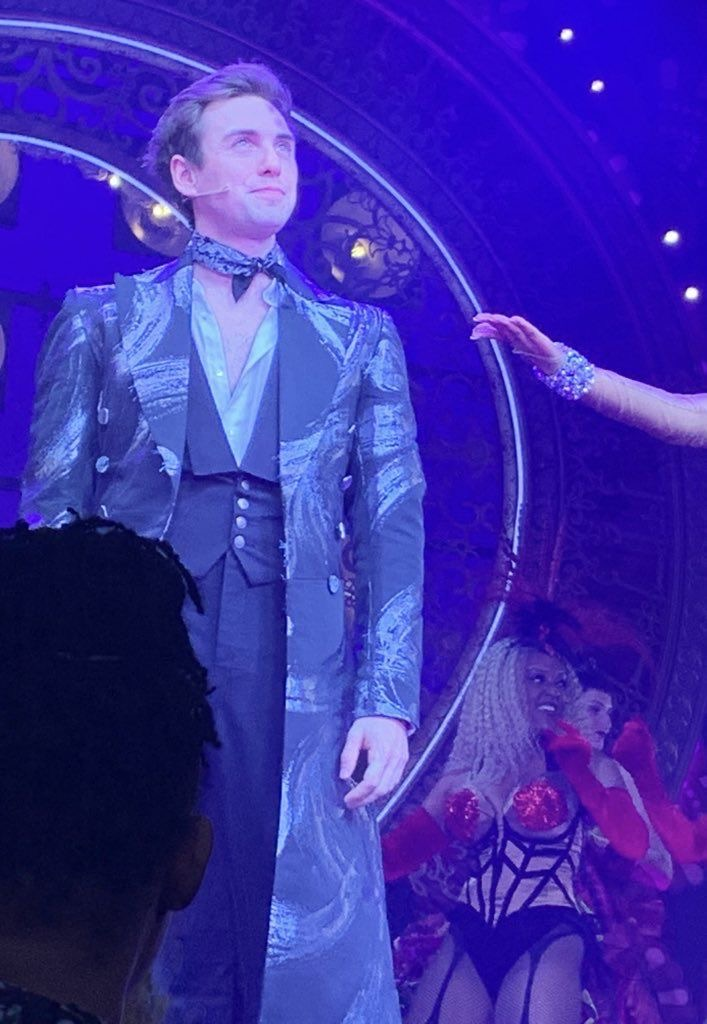
- Muscato in Moulin Rouge! in 2023
- Born: 12 April 1990 (age 36); Brighton and Hove, England
- Occupations: Actor; singer
- Years active: 2009–present
- Notable work: Heathers: The Musical; Les Miserables; The Great Gatsby

Jamie Muscato (born 12 April 1990) is an English actor and singer.

Muscato is best known for his portrayal of Jason Dean (J.D.) in the original London run of Heathers: The Musical in 2018. He has starred in several other West End productions, including The Great Gatsby as Jay Gatsby, Moulin Rouge! as Christian, Cabaret as the Emcee, and Les Misérables as Enjolras. He also starred in the London premiere of Natasha, Pierre & The Great Comet of 1812 as Anatole Kuragin from December 2024 to February 2025, where he received a Laurence Olivier Award nomination for Best Actor in a Musical.

As a teenager, he was in a production of Unforgotten as a member of the British Youth Music Theatre, continuing his musical theatre training and appearing in other singing competitions. His first professional role was as an ensemble swing for the original London cast of Spring Awakening, marking his West End debut after its transfer, he later starred as Melchior in the 2024 West End reunion concert. From 2019 to 2020, he starred as Tony in West Side Story at the Curve Theatre.

== Early life and theatre beginnings ==
Muscato grew up in Brighton. When he was eight, he took part in an open audition for a pantomime in his hometown. He then fell in love with acting and joined several amateur theatre companies, saying later on that "[acting has] been the only thing I've wanted to do since then and I've been lucky to make a career out of it". He auditioned for the role of Harry Potter in the films, and performed in front of director Chris Columbus. He starred in productions of Unforgotten in the British Youth Music Theatre in 2004 and 2005.

Muscato took part in the ITV show Stars in Their Eyes Kids at age 15, auditioning for the contest, thanks to a tape submitted by his mother. For the show, he impersonated Michael Crawford, singing The Music of the Night from The Phantom of the Opera.

On 29 October 2006, at the London Wicked day celebration, he participated in the singing contest held during the event as one of ten, with the song Dancing Through Life. He went on to win the competition.

== Acting career ==
=== 2009–2014: Professional debut and career beginnings ===
Muscato was cast in the original London production of Spring Awakening as a swing, by its casting director Pippa Ailion after she had seen him in a singing competition. This marked his professional debut, as the show ran in the Lyric Hammersmith from 23 January 2009, through to 14 March 2009. Muscato later made his West End debut following the show's transfer to the Novello Theatre, where it played from 21 March 2009, until its early closure on 30 May 2009.

Muscato joined the 25th Anniversary Tour of Les Misérables in his first named role as Jean Prouvaire. The tour started in the Wales Millennium Centre on 12 December 2009, in Cardiff. The tour made stops in Manchester, Norwich, Birmingham, Edinburgh and Paris, until it settled in the Barbican Theatre from 14 September 2010, to 2 October 2010. Muscato appears in the live cast recording of the show as Prouvaire. Muscato also performed in the 25th anniversary concert production of Les Misérables at The O2 Arena in London in the role of Joly.

Following the tour of Les Misérables, Muscato joined the musical Love Story as an ensemble cast member, as well as understudy for Oliver Barrett IV. He joined the show after its transfer to the Duchess Theatre, in 2010. The show closed on 26 February 2011. During the run, a cast recording was announced, which includes Muscato. After Love Story ended its run, he joined the ensemble cast of the original West End run of Rock of Ages, also understudying for both Drew and Franz. He took a break from the show to film for the movie version of Les Misérables, where he was part of the ensemble cast as a revolutionary student. Later during the 85th Academy Awards, Muscato was offered the opportunity to be flown to Los Angeles to perform alongside the main cast of the film.

Muscato continued in Rock of Ages until late 2013, where he joined the cast of the world premiere of The Light Princess as an ensemble cast member and understudy for lead male Digby. It ran in the National Theatre from 9 October 2013, through 2 February 2014. He later remarked in an interview that it was his dream to perform in the National Theatre after he had visited it on a school trip, which was fulfilled after he had performed in the show. Muscato is part of the show's cast recording, released in 2015, as a member of the ensemble.

=== 2014–2017: First lead role, other musicals, and first television role ===
Following its 2012 run Off-Broadway, Dogfight was announced in May 2014 to be receiving both its European and UK premiere in the Southwark Playhouse, for a month-long engagement from 13 August 2014, through 13 September 2014. On 30 June 2014, casting for the show was announced, with Muscato playing the lead role of Eddie Birdlace. This marked his first lead role in a professional production, playing opposite Laura Jane Matthewson, who was cast as Rose Fenny. Muscato received positive reviews for his performance, citing his charismatic portrayal, acting, and vocal quality. Exactly a year after the show's closing, a reunion of the cast was announced, to perform a one-night only concert production of the show. It played on the St. James Theatre on 11 October 2015.

Muscato made his television debut as English musician Rory Storm in 2014 ITV series Cilla, about English singer Cilla Black's early career.

Muscato was announced to be playing Nathan in The House of Mirrors and Hearts, which would be playing in the Arcola Theatre. The show ran from 7 July 2015, to 1 August 2015. It received mixed reviews, praising the cast, including Muscato for his charm, but criticizing its plot and dialogue.

In October 2015, Muscato joined the Welsh National Opera production of Sweeney Todd, touring around the United Kingdom. He portrayed Anthony Hope. The tour started in Cardiff, then made stops throughout Southampton, Bristol, Llandudno, Oxford, Liverpool, and Birmingham before returning to Cardiff. The tour took place from 15 October 2015, through 29 November 2015.

On 4 December 2015, Muscato was announced to be taking over the role of Joe in the premiere production of Bend It Like Beckham in the Phoenix Theatre, from the role's originator, Jamie Campbell Bower. He appeared in performances starting 14 December 2015, until the show's closing on 15 March 2016. As part of the VAULT festival, Muscato starred as the titular character in the one-man musical Stay Awake, Jake for four days, from 3 to 7 February 2016.

In April 2016, Muscato starred in a workshop alongside Melissa Errico for The Gold Room, a musical from the creative team of Michael Feinstein and Warner Brown. It was directed by Jeremy Sams. The workshop was an industry-only event, which was not open to the public.

The London production of Lazarus was announced on 25 July 2016, following the death of the musical's author David Bowie earlier in the year, to be playing at the Kings Cross Theatre from 8 November 2016, through 22 January 2017. On 15 September 2016, Muscato was announced to be in the cast as Ben. The London production featuring Muscato was filmed and eventually screened for one night at the Kings Theatre on 2 May 2018, played alongside a live accompaniment by the original band. The film was streamed again in 2021 for a weekend, in honor of David Bowie's birthday and death anniversary.

On 19 May 2017, The Other Palace announced five musicals in various stages of development to be seen for a fraction of a price, in a workshop-style production in the theatre's studio. Heathers, a musical based on the 1989 cult classic of the same name was the first of the set whose cast was announced, where Muscato was cast as the lead male role, Jason "J.D." Dean. He played the role opposite Charlotte Wakefield as Veronica for five performances, from 30 May – 5 June 2017. Later in June, Bonnie & Clyde, a musical based on the eponymous criminal duo, was the third of the five to receive a cast. Muscato was announced to be playing Clyde Barrow, opposite Evelyn Hoskins who would be playing Bonnie Parker. Five performances took place, from 26 June – 1 July 2017.

Later that month, a staging of Big Fish was announced to be staged in The Other Palace, based on the 2003 film of the same name. Muscato was announced to be portraying a younger version of Edward Bloom, complementing the older counterpart led and portrayed by Kelsey Grammer. The show ran from 1 November 2017, through 31 December 2017.

=== 2018–2020: Heathers, one-off shows, and West Side Story ===
In April 2018, Carrie Hope Fletcher was announced to be playing the role of Veronica Sawyer in the European premiere and full staging of Heathers in The Other Palace. Later in May, more of the production's cast was announced, including Muscato, who was recast from the previous year's studio staging of the musical. Like in the previous production, he played J.D., a mysterious student with a dark past who strings Veronica along for the bloodthirsty pursuit of the popular students in Westerburg High. The show was announced to run for eight weeks, starting 9 June 2018, through 4 August 2018. For West End Live, the cast of Heathers including Muscato performed a handful of songs from the musical. Due to demand, a transfer to the West End was announced on 4 July 2018, which would run from 3 September 2018, through 24 November 2018.

As announced, the show returned after its break for its transfer to the West End in the Theatre Royal Haymarket, which received updates to its script, as well as a new song. On 19 October 2018, a cast recording of the show including Muscato was announced. The show ended as scheduled on 24 November 2018.

Muscato received praise for his portrayal of J.D. In a review for the show, britishtheatre.com writer Danny Coleman-Cooke called Muscato "the stand-out performer" and praised his acting and comedic timing. Writing for The Independent, Paul Taylor praised Muscato's vocal ability and performance that "[combined] seductive, witty charm and a haunted, high-risk insecurity". He was also praised for his charisma and chemistry with Fletcher. For his performance as J.D., Muscato was nominated in the 2019 WhatsOnStage Awards for Best Actor in a Musical.

On 22 February 2019, Ghostlight Records released the second single from the musical's cast recording, entitled "Seventeen". It is a duet between Veronica and J.D., where the former convinces the latter to leave their bloodstained past behind to live together as a high school couple. Accompanying it is a music video featuring Muscato and Fletcher, captured at Livingston Studios and Abbey Road Studios. Muscato also appeared in the music video of the first single "I Say No" and has a single line in the song. The cast recording of the musical was released on 1 March 2019.

Muscato participated in The Other Palace's MT Fest 2019, a two-week musical theatre festival mounting a "Taster Menu" series of semi-staged musicals, 45 minutes each in length. He starred as Jared alongside former castmate Carrie Hope Fletcher in an adaptation of But I'm a Cheerleader for three days, from 18 to 20 February 2019.

As part of the Sunday Favourites series of solo concerts held in The Other Palace, Muscato performed his own on 9 June 2019. He performed alongside friends and former castmates, covered other artists' songs, and performed songs from musicals he had previously starred in. He also celebrated his mother's birthday during the concert.

On 16 June 2019, he starred as Henry Glynn in a one-off concert production of The Clockmaker's Daughter, which was staged in the Cadogan Hall.

On 15 August 2019, Muscato was announced to be playing the lead role of Tony in West Side Story, alongside Adriana Ivelisse as Maria. To promote the show, the channel released 40-second clips of Muscato singing "Something's Coming" on 25 September 2019, and "Tonight" alongside Ivelisse on 14 October 2019. The production ran from 23 November 2019, until 11 January 2020. Muscato received praise for his portrayal of Tony, praising his vocal ability alongside Ivelisse.

Muscato is credited in his portfolio to have appeared in 2018 film The Nun as Father Patino, but is uncredited in the film. Muscato appears in 2019 BBC TV historical drama series The Trial of Christine Keeler as a police officer in the first episode.

=== 2021–2023: The Colour of Spring, return to Les Misérables, and Moulin Rouge! ===
As a result of the COVID-19 pandemic, many of Muscato's upcoming projects were cancelled or postponed. With his former castmate Laura Jane Matthewson, Muscato performed as a part of Back Garden Busk in Chorleywood in August and September 2020, socially distanced from the audience. In December 2020, Muscato worked with The Umbrella Rooms, performing several songs as a part of a live prerecorded concert on the website.

At the end of 2020, The Colour of Spring directed by Paul Andrew Kimball premiered on several film festivals, starring Muscato as leading man Sam Cameron, opposite Alexa Morden as Sarah. The film is shot almost exclusively in black-and-white. The film received critical acclaim, being heavily awarded in many film festivals internationally. For his role as Sam Cameron, he has won at least 16 awards for Best Actor across several film festivals.

Muscato starred in a digital revival of BKLYN - The Musical as Taylor, with Emma Kingston as Brooklyn. The show premiered through the stream.theatre website. The musical was available on the website from 22 March to 4 April 2021.

After the original extension of the Les Misérables staged concert was suspended on 16 December 2020, after only 10 performances due to local COVID restrictions, the show was announced to be returning on 10 March 2021. Muscato was announced to be playing Enjolras on 4 May 2021, replacing Bradley Jaden, who had taken over the role of Javert. The concert production ran from 20 May through 5 September 2021.

On 3 December 2021, Toy Soldier Productions announced that it was developing a musical based on Shakespeare's play Macbeth, and that Muscato was part of the cast. He was later announced to be playing Banquo. A single starring Muscato from the musical was announced on 22 December 2022, titled "However Hard I Try", which was released on 13 January 2023. The song is about Banquo's internal conflict with the knowledge of King Duncan's murder by his close friend, Macbeth. A music video featuring Muscato was released on the production's YouTube channel.

Continuing with his venture into on-screen television acting, Muscato appeared on British medical drama Doctors as Wes Corbett, a guitarist squabbling with his bandmate. The episode aired on 7 March 2022. He then starred on the 2022 Pistol miniseries as British journalist Neil Spencer. The miniseries' premiered in the United Kingdom on 24 May 2022, which Muscato attended. Muscato later appeared in British TV series The Undeclared War as Finn for four episodes. Muscato starred in German/British television series The Chemistry of Death for one episode as Alan Ratcliffe. The show premiered on 19 January 2023, in the United Kingdom.

In February 2022, Muscato's rendition of Meant to Be Yours from Heathers: The Musical entered the Spotify Viral Top 50 in 31 countries, Top 5 in 9 countries, and Top 1 in Canada and Australia after a portion of the song became viral on the TikTok app. Muscato himself also participated in the trend, posting his own video with the sound. Billie Eilish also participated in the trend. As of July 2023, the sound was used in over 100 thousand videos. Looking back on the trend, Muscato said in an interview that "it was fascinating", and that he "felt so proud that something [he'd] done affected so many people".

Muscato was announced to be part of the cast of the UK workshop of Starry the Musical, a musical based on the letters between Vincent van Gogh and his brother Theo van Gogh, where he played Vincent. The workshop ran from 28 March 2022, to 7 April 2022, with a closed industry showing on 8 April 2022.

On 5 September 2022, Muscato was announced to be taking over the role of Christian in Moulin Rouge! The Musical from its originator, Jamie Bogyo. He would be playing alongside Melissa James, who would be taking over the role of Satine. As announced, the cast change happened on 17 October 2022. Muscato was praised for his portrayal of Christian, mainly for his vocal ability and acting, where it was highlighting his charm and charisma. For West End Live, he performed "El Tango de Roxanne" from the musical on 17 June 2023. Muscato performed as Christian until 14 October 2023.

On 21 September 2022, Muscato was announced to be starring in a one-night-only concert production of Once alongside Carrie Hope Fletcher, which would take place on 12 March 2023, in the London Palladium. Due to demand, an additional matinee performance was added on 5 October 2022. To promote the performance, Muscato and Fletcher performed "Falling Slowly" from the musical on WhatsOnStage.com's YouTube channel on 14 February 2023. The performances took place as scheduled on 12 March 2023.

A TikTok video uploaded by Steven Sater on 17 December 2022, revealed that Muscato was a part of the workshop cast of Nero, a musical Sater and Duncan Sheik had been working on since 2006.

On 7 August 2023, Muscato was announced to be taking part in Stephen Schwartz's birthday concert, Schwartz at 75, which took place at the Lyric Theatre on 17 September 2023. Later in October, Muscato played Matt "Matty" Flamhaff in a workshop run of the musical 13 Going on 30 at Battersea Arts Centre.

=== 2024–present: Olivier Award nomination, The Great Comet, and The Great Gatsby ===
Muscato announced his own solo concert on 17 November 2023, to play in July 2024 at Cadogan Hall. A matinee show was added after the evening show sold out in minutes.

On 17 October 2024, Donmar Warehouse announced on Instagram that Muscato would be starring in the London premiere and Off-West End production of Natasha, Pierre & The Great Comet of 1812 as Anatole Kuragin from December 2024 to February 2025. He was nominated for a Laurence Olivier Award for his performance.

On 6 February 2025, it was announced Muscato would star in the titular role for the London and West End premiere of The Great Gatsby opposite Frances Mayli McCann as Daisy and Corbin Bleu as Nick, which began performances on 11 April 2025. For his performance as Jay Gatsby, Muscato has been nominated for the 2026 WhatsOnStage Award for best performance in a musical.

On 15 July 2025, it was announced that Muscato would star as Dexter Mayhew in the world premiere of One Day (musical) at the Royal Lyceum Theatre in Edinburgh opposite Sharon Rose as Emma Morley. The production began performances in February 2026 and its run was later extended until 19 April 2026 due to demand.

On 30th July 2025, Muscato announced his second solo concert taking place at Theatre Royal Drury Lane on 22nd March 2026. The evening show sold out and a matinee performance was later announced to take place on the same day.

On 10 April 2026, it was announced that Muscato would be starring in the West End production of Cabaret as the Emcee opposite Joy Woods as Sally Bowles from May to September 2026.

In October 2026, he's set to star in a West End concert staging of the sequel to The Phantom of the Opera by Andrew Lloyd Webber, Love Never Dies as The Phantom of the Opera at the London Palladium.

== Discography ==
=== Albums ===
- Live 2024 - Live from Cadogan Hall (2025)

=== Cast recordings ===
- Strangers – Brighton Theatre Group Studio Cast (2005)
- Les Misérables Live! (2010 London Cast Recording) (First Night Records, 2010)
- Love Story – Original London Cast Recording (Faber Music, 2011)
- The Light Princess (Original Cast Recording) (Universal/Mercury Records, 2015)
- Heathers: The Musical (Original West End Cast Recording) (Ghostlight Records, 2019)

=== Singles ===
- Seventeen – from Heathers: The Musical (Original West End Cast Recording), alongside Carrie Hope Fletcher, released 22 February 2019
- However Hard I Try – from Lady M, released 13 January 2023

=== Music videos ===
- I Say No – from Heathers: The Musical (Original West End Cast Recording), alongside Carrie Hope Fletcher, released 15 February 2019
- Seventeen – from Heathers: The Musical (Original West End Cast Recording), alongside Carrie Hope Fletcher, released 22 February 2019
- However Hard I Try – from Lady M, released 13 January 2023

== Filmography ==
=== Film ===
Year	Title	Role	Notes and awards
2008	Wild Oats	Ben	
2008	The Euphoria of Drowning	Max	
2010	Les Misérables in Concert: The 25th Anniversary	Joly	
2012	Les Misérables	Ensemble student	
2018	The Nun	Father Patino	Uncredited
2020	The Colour of Spring	Sam Cameron	Won Best Actor in at least 16 different film festivals
2021	Brooklyn: The Musical	Taylor	
2024	What We Wished We Could Be	Aiden	Best performance in a drama winner BIFA short film festival

=== Television ===
Year	Title	Role	Notes
2014	Cilla	Rory Storm	2 episodes
2019	The Trial of Christine Keeler	Police officer	Episode: "Episode 1.1"
2022	Doctors	Wes Corbett	Episode: "There's Something About Amy"
2022	Pistol	Neil Spencer	Episode: "Bodies"
2022	The Undeclared War	Finn	4 episodes
2023	The Chemistry of Death	Alan Ratcliffe	Episode: "Where the Wind Blows You"

== Stage credits ==
Year	Title	Role	Theatre	Location
2009	Spring Awakening	On-stage swing	Lyric Hammersmith	Off-West End
2009	Spring Awakening	On-stage swing	Novello Theatre	West End
2009	Les Misérables	Jean Prouvaire	—N/a	25th Anniversary UK Tour
2010	Les Misérables	Joly	The O2 Arena	Greenwich Peninsula
2010	Love Story	Ensemble, U/S Oliver Barrett	Duchess Theatre	West End
2011-2013	Rock of Ages	Ensemble, U/S Drew and Franz	Shaftesbury Theatre	West End
2013	The Light Princess	Ensemble, U/S Digby	Royal National Theatre	Off-West End
2014	Dogfight	Eddie Birdlace	Southwark Playhouse	Off-West End
2015	The House of Mirrors and Hearts	Nathan	Arcola Theatre	Off-West End
2015	Sweeney Todd: The Demon Barber of Fleet Street	Anthony Hope	—N/a	Welsh National Opera Tour
2015	Dogfight	Eddie Birdlace	St. James Theatre	Off-West End
2016	Bend It Like Beckham	Joe	Phoenix Theatre	West End
2016	Stay Awake, Jake	Jake	Vault Festival	Waterloo
2016	A Subject of Scandal and Concern	George Jacob Holyoake	Finborough Theatre	Off-West End
2016-2017	Lazarus	Ben	King's Head Theatre	London
2017	Heathers: The Musical	Jason "J.D." Dean	The Other Palace	Workshop
2017	Bonnie & Clyde	Clyde Barrow	The Other Palace	Workshop
2017	Big Fish	Young Edward Bloom	The Other Palace	Off-West End
2018	Heathers: The Musical	Jason "J.D." Dean	The Other Palace	Off-West End
2018	Heathers: The Musical	Jason "J.D." Dean	Theatre Royal Haymarket	West End
2019	But I'm a Cheerleader	Jared	The Other Palace	Off-West End
2019	The Clockmaker’s Daughter	Henry Glynn	Cadogan Hall	Off-West End
2019	Murder At The Gates	Ethan	The Other Palace	Rehearsed reading
2019–2020	West Side Story	Tony	Curve	Leicester
2021	BKLYN - The Musical	Taylor	Greenwich Theatre	London
2021	Les Misérables	Enjolras	Sondheim Theatre	West End
2022–2023	Moulin Rouge! The Musical	Christian	Piccadilly Theatre	West End
2023	Once	Guy	London Palladium	West End
2023	13 Going on 30	Matt "Matty" Flamhaff	Battersea Arts Centre	Off-West End
2024	Spring Awakening	Melchior	Victoria Palace Theatre	West End
2024	Carousel	Billy Bigelow	Southbank Centre	West End
2024–2025	Natasha, Pierre & The Great Comet of 1812	Anatole Kuragin	Donmar Warehouse	Off-West End
2025	The Great Gatsby	Jay Gatsby	London Coliseum	West End
2026	One Day: The Musical	Dexter	Royal Lyceum Theatre	Edinburgh
2026	Cabaret	The Emcee	Playhouse Theatre	West End
2026	Love Never Dies	The Phantom of the Opera	London Palladium	West End
2026-2027	One Day: The Musical	Dexter	Garrick Theatre	West End

== Awards and nominations ==
Year	Work	Award	Category	Result
2019	Heathers: The Musical	WhatsOnStage Award	Best Actor in a Musical	Nominated
2020	The Colour of Spring	Actors Awards	Best Actor	Won
2023	Moulin Rouge: The Musical	West End Wilma Award	Best Takeover in a Role	Won
2025	Natasha, Pierre & The Great Comet of 1812	Laurence Olivier Awards	Best Actor in a Musical	Nominated
2026	The Great Gatsby	WhatsOnStage Award	Best Performer in a Musical	Nominated
