= The Stage Debut Awards =

UK theatre awards ceremony

- Type: Theatre awards
- Sponsored by: Netflix; Arts Council England
- Country: United Kingdom
- Presented by: The Stage
- Established: 2017

The Stage Debut Awards are theatre awards recognising individuals making their professional debuts in performing arts in the UK. The annual ceremony was launched in 2017 by The Stage and include accolades for Best Performer in a Play, Best Writer, Best Designer and the Best West End Debut Performer. Recipients of these awards have gone on to star in West End shows, television series and films.

The awards ceremony is held annually at 8 Northumberland Avenue, London.

In 2020, the Best Actor in a Play and Best Actress in a Play awards were updated to Best Performer in a Play and the Best Actor in a Musical and Best Actress in a Musical awards were updated to Best Performer in a Musical.

== Judging process ==
Eligible nominees must be aged 16 or over, and making their professional debut in a named role in a production reviewed by The Stage. For acting roles this should be a first named role. The Stage's nationwide network of theatre critics put forward nominees from productions they have reviewed. Performers, writers, directors, designers and composers making their stage debut (and their agents) are also able to nominate themselves online for consideration. The public can also nominate individuals for each category.

Industry professionals from across the UK are then invited to give their input into the longlist. These advisors have included producer Danielle Tarento, casting director David Grindrod, David Jubb, Battersea Arts Centre, designer Es Devlin, Hannah Miller, Royal Shakespeare Company; James Grieve, Paines Plough; Jenny Sealey, Graeae; Jimmy Fay, Lyric Theatre; Laura Donnelly, National Theatre of Scotland; Madani Younis, Bush Theatre; director Michael Grandage; actor Noma Dumezweni, designer Paule Constable; Pravesh Kumar, Rifco; actor Preeya Kalidas; Sam Hodges, Nuffield Southampton Theatres; producer Sonia Friedman; Tom Morris, Bristol Old Vic; and Wendy Spon, National Theatre.

The judging panel decide on the shortlist and winners in all categories, except the Best West End Debut where the shortlist is voted on by the public. The Best West End Debut award recognises those who are making their professional debut in London's West End. This includes individuals who have previously made their debut outside of the West End.

== Ceremony ==
In 2017, the inaugural The Stage Debut Awards Ceremony took place at 8 Northumberland Avenue, London, on September 17.

The ceremony was hosted by West End leading man Ben Forster. Category Presenters included director Michael Grandage, actor Sharon D. Clarke, actor Rachel Tucker, Theatre owner Nica Burns, National Theatre director Rufus Norris and actor Kenneth Cranham. Exclusive performances at the ceremony were from Dreamgirls and the National Theatre's Follies.

In 2018, the ceremony took place on September 23 at 8 Northumberland Avenue, London. The ceremony was hosted by Cush Jumbo and the Category Presenters included director Michael Grandage, actor Ruthie Henshall, singer Preeya Kalidas, actor Jodie Prenger, and lighting designer Paule Constable. Exclusive performances at the ceremony were from Anaïs Mitchell and Miriam-Teak Lee.

In 2019, the ceremony took place at The Brewery, London, on September 15. The ceremony was hosted by Cush Jumbo, and the exclusive performances were by Rachel Tucker and Amara Okereke. Category Presenters included actor Giles Terera, actor Michael Xavier, singer Brenda Edwards, actor Janie Dee, actor Mark Gatiss, and playwright Inua Ellams.

The first digital ceremony was hosted as a free online event in 2020 by Miriam-Teak Lee (winner of Best Actress in a Musical in 2017) on 27 September and featured an exclusive performance from SpitLip (winner of the 2019 Best Composer/Lyricist awards).

In 2021, no ceremony took place due to the Coronavirus pandemic.

In 2022, the ceremony took place at 8 Northumberland Avenue, London on Sunday, September 18. The ceremony was hosted by Susan Wokoma, and exclusive performances were by Shan Ako, Samuel Thomas, Frances Mayli McCann and Natalie Paris. Category Presenters included actor Amanda Abbington, director Jamie Lloyd, singer-songwriter and performer Louise Rednapp, singer Jay McGuiness, actor Matt Henry and theatre designer Anna Fleischle.

In 2023, the ceremony took place at 8 Northumberland Avenue, London on Sunday, October 1. The ceremony was hosted by Divina de Campo, and the exclusive performances were by Emily Benjamin, Zizi Strallen and Rachael Wooding. Category Presenters included actor Callum Scott Howells, singer Faye Tozer, director Rebecca Frecknall, lighting designer Prem Mehta, writer Morgan Lloyd Malcom, actor John Partridge, actor Bertie Carvel and actor Omari Douglas.

In 2024, the ceremony took place on Sunday, September 29 at 8 Northumberland Avenue.

In 2025, the ceremony took place on Sunday, September 28 at 8 Northumberland Avenue.

In 2026, the ceremony took place on Sunday, September 27 and 8 Northumberland Avenue.

== Previous winners ==
=== 2026 ===
Award	Winner	Nominees
Best Performer in a Play	Robert Aramayo for Guess How Much I Love You? at Royal Court Theatre, London Zoë Armer for The Virgins at Soho Theatre, London	Noah Jupe for Romeo and Juliet at Harold Pinter Theatre, London
Best Performer in a Play	Robert Aramayo for Guess How Much I Love You? at Royal Court Theatre, London Zoë Armer for The Virgins at Soho Theatre, London	Assa Kanouté for Much Ado About Nothing at Shakespeare's Globe Theatre, London
Best Performer in a Play	Robert Aramayo for Guess How Much I Love You? at Royal Court Theatre, London Zoë Armer for The Virgins at Soho Theatre, London	Erin Kellyman for Evening All Afternoon at Donmar Warehouse, London
Best Performer in a Play	Robert Aramayo for Guess How Much I Love You? at Royal Court Theatre, London Zoë Armer for The Virgins at Soho Theatre, London	Dylan Malyn for To Kill a Mockingbird at Leeds Playhouse, and touring
Best Performer in a Play	Robert Aramayo for Guess How Much I Love You? at Royal Court Theatre, London Zoë Armer for The Virgins at Soho Theatre, London	Ruaridh Mollica for Clarkston at Trafalgar Theatre, London
Best Performer in a Play	Robert Aramayo for Guess How Much I Love You? at Royal Court Theatre, London Zoë Armer for The Virgins at Soho Theatre, London	Amber van der Brugge for Vincent in Brixton at Orange Tree Theatre, London
Best Performer in a Musical	Julianne Pundan for Miss Saigon at Palace Theatre, Manchester, and touring James Spence for The Thespians at Mercury Theatre, Colchester, and touring	Jess Douglas-Welsh for Redcliffe at Southwark Playhouse Borough, London
Best Performer in a Musical	Julianne Pundan for Miss Saigon at Palace Theatre, Manchester, and touring James Spence for The Thespians at Mercury Theatre, Colchester, and touring	Jess Folley for Burlesque at Savoy Theatre, London
Best Performer in a Musical	Julianne Pundan for Miss Saigon at Palace Theatre, Manchester, and touring James Spence for The Thespians at Mercury Theatre, Colchester, and touring	Lydia Louise for Chitty Chitty Bang Bang at Watermill Theatre, Newbury
Best Performer in a Musical	Julianne Pundan for Miss Saigon at Palace Theatre, Manchester, and touring James Spence for The Thespians at Mercury Theatre, Colchester, and touring	Sheridan Townsley for Sing Street at Lyric Hammersmith, London
Best Director	Tommaso Giacomin for The Uncontainable Nausea of Alec Baldwin at New Diorama Theatre, London	Douglas Clarke-Wood for THIS IS NOT ABOUT ME. at Summerhall, Edinburgh
Best Director	Tommaso Giacomin for The Uncontainable Nausea of Alec Baldwin at New Diorama Theatre, London	Ralph Fiennes for As You Like It at Theatre Royal Bath
Best Director	Tommaso Giacomin for The Uncontainable Nausea of Alec Baldwin at New Diorama Theatre, London	Michelle McTernan for HOP – The Hopeful Hare at Swansea Grand Theatre
Best Designer	Natalie Roar (Costume design) for Les Liaisons Dangereuses at National Theatre, London	Lev Govorovski and Ted Walliker (Set and lighting design) for Ron at Riverside Studios, London
Best Designer	Natalie Roar (Costume design) for Les Liaisons Dangereuses at National Theatre, London	Alex Mullins (Costume design) for Teeth 'n' Smiles at Duke of York's Theatre, London
Best Writer	Georgie Dettmer for Are You Watching? at Royal Court Theatre, London	Chris Ashworth-Bennion for The Red Rogue of Bala at Theatr Clwyd, Mold
Best Writer	Georgie Dettmer for Are You Watching? at Royal Court Theatre, London	Hannah Doran for The Meat Kings! (Inc.) of Brooklyn Heights at Park Theatre, London
Best Writer	Georgie Dettmer for Are You Watching? at Royal Court Theatre, London	Leo Drayton for Dynolwaith at Sherman Theatre, Cardiff
Best Writer	Georgie Dettmer for Are You Watching? at Royal Court Theatre, London	Fran Kranz for Mass at Donmar Warehouse, London
Best Writer	Georgie Dettmer for Are You Watching? at Royal Court Theatre, London	John Morton for Eclipse at Chichester Festival Theatre
Best Writer	Georgie Dettmer for Are You Watching? at Royal Court Theatre, London	Jack Nicholls for The Shitheads at Royal Court Theatre, London
Best Writer	Georgie Dettmer for Are You Watching? at Royal Court Theatre, London	Danielle Phillips for Children of the Night at Cast, Doncaster
Best Composer, Lyricist or Book Writer	Jordan Luke Gage (Book, Music, Lyrics) for Redcliffe at Southwark Playhouse Borough, London	John Carney and Gary Clark (Music, Lyrics) for Sing Street at Lyric Hammersmith, London
Best Composer, Lyricist or Book Writer	Jordan Luke Gage (Book, Music, Lyrics) for Redcliffe at Southwark Playhouse Borough, London	Guido García Lueches and Sergio Antonio Maggiolo (Book, Music, Lyrics) for Jeezus! at Underbelly Cowgate, Edinburgh and New Diorama, London
Best Composer, Lyricist or Book Writer	Jordan Luke Gage (Book, Music, Lyrics) for Redcliffe at Southwark Playhouse Borough, London	Ed Zanders (Music, Lyrics) for Thespians at Mercury Theatre, Colchester, and touring
Best West End Debut Performer	Sadie Sink for Romeo and Juliet at Harold Pinter Theatre	Levi Brown for Cyrano de Bergerac at Noël Coward Theatre
Best West End Debut Performer	Sadie Sink for Romeo and Juliet at Harold Pinter Theatre	Brendan Gleeson for The Weir at Harold Pinter Theatre
Best West End Debut Performer	Sadie Sink for Romeo and Juliet at Harold Pinter Theatre	Liv Hill for 1536 at Ambassadors Theatre
Best West End Debut Performer	Sadie Sink for Romeo and Juliet at Harold Pinter Theatre	Noah Jupe for Romeo and Juliet at Harold Pinter Theatre
Best West End Debut Performer	Sadie Sink for Romeo and Juliet at Harold Pinter Theatre	Cormac McAlinden for Inter Alia at Wyndham's Theatre
Best West End Debut Performer	Sadie Sink for Romeo and Juliet at Harold Pinter Theatre	Ntombizodwa Ndlovu for Marie and Rosetta at @sohoplace
Best West End Debut Performer	Sadie Sink for Romeo and Juliet at Harold Pinter Theatre	Alistair Nwachukwu for The Boy Who Harnessed the Wind at @sohoplace
Best West End Debut Performer	Sadie Sink for Romeo and Juliet at Harold Pinter Theatre	Kate Phillips for The Weir at Harold Pinter Theatre
Best West End Debut Performer	Sadie Sink for Romeo and Juliet at Harold Pinter Theatre	Arti Shah for Paddington the Musical at Savoy Theatre
Best Creative West End Debut	Ava Pickett (Writer) for 1536 at Ambassadors Theatre	Finn den Hertog (Director) for The Fifth Step at @sohoplace
Best Creative West End Debut	Ava Pickett (Writer) for 1536 at Ambassadors Theatre	Tom Fletcher (Composer/Lyricist) for Paddington the Musical at Savoy Theatre
Best Creative West End Debut	Ava Pickett (Writer) for 1536 at Ambassadors Theatre	Rachel Joyce (Book) and Passenger (Composer/Lyrics) for The Unlikely Pilgrimage of Harold Fry at Theatre Royal Haymarket

=== 2025 ===
Award	Winner	Nominees
Best Performer in a Play	Hilson Agbangbe in Wonder Boy at Bristol Old Vic Lucy Karczewski for Stereophonic at Duke of York’s Theatre, London	Paula Clarke for The Tragedy of Richard III at Lyric Theatre, Belfast
Best Performer in a Play	Hilson Agbangbe in Wonder Boy at Bristol Old Vic Lucy Karczewski for Stereophonic at Duke of York’s Theatre, London	Joseph Edwards for The Red Shoes at Swan Theatre, Royal Shakespeare Company, Stratford-Upon-Avon
Best Performer in a Play	Hilson Agbangbe in Wonder Boy at Bristol Old Vic Lucy Karczewski for Stereophonic at Duke of York’s Theatre, London	Eva Morgan for The Glass Menagerie at Yard Theatre, London
Best Performer in a Play	Hilson Agbangbe in Wonder Boy at Bristol Old Vic Lucy Karczewski for Stereophonic at Duke of York’s Theatre, London	Christopher Neenan for Blood Wedding at Omnibus Theatre, London
Best Performer in a Play	Hilson Agbangbe in Wonder Boy at Bristol Old Vic Lucy Karczewski for Stereophonic at Duke of York’s Theatre, London	Daisy Sequerra for Ballet Shoes at National Theatre, London
Best Performer in a Play	Hilson Agbangbe in Wonder Boy at Bristol Old Vic Lucy Karczewski for Stereophonic at Duke of York’s Theatre, London	Jasper Talbot for Redlands at Chichester Festival Theatre
Best Performer in a Musical	Leesa Tulley for Why Am I So Single? at Garrick Theatre, London	Megan Ellis for Muriel’s Wedding the Musical at Curve, Leicester
Best Performer in a Musical	Leesa Tulley for Why Am I So Single? at Garrick Theatre, London	Dora Gee for The Mad Ones at The Other Palace, London
Best Performer in a Musical	Leesa Tulley for Why Am I So Single? at Garrick Theatre, London	Eve Shanu-Wilson for The Phantom of the Opera at His Majesty’s Theatre, London
Best Director	Richard Mylan for Mumfighter at Swansea Grand Theatre	Aditya Chopra for Come Fall in Love at Opera House, Manchester
Best Director	Richard Mylan for Mumfighter at Swansea Grand Theatre	Nathan Crossan-Smith for The Walrus Has a Right to Adventure at Liverpool Everyman
Best Director	Richard Mylan for Mumfighter at Swansea Grand Theatre	Adam Karim for Guards at the Taj at Orange Tree Theatre, London
Best Director	Richard Mylan for Mumfighter at Swansea Grand Theatre	Emily Susanne Lloyd for The Mad Ones at The Other Palace, London
Best Designer	Hannah Schmidt for The Passenger / Personal Values at Finborough Theatre / Hampstead Theatre, London	Juliette Demoulin for various at Finborough Theatre, London
Best Designer	Hannah Schmidt for The Passenger / Personal Values at Finborough Theatre / Hampstead Theatre, London	Adam Jefferys for Communion at Bush Theatre, London
Best Designer	Hannah Schmidt for The Passenger / Personal Values at Finborough Theatre / Hampstead Theatre, London	Chloe Wyn for The Walrus Has a Right to Adventure at Liverpool Everyman
Best Writer	Ava Pickett for 1536 at Almeida Theatre, London Milly Sweeney for Water Colour at Pitlochry Festival Theatre and Byre Theatre, St Andrews	Sarah Bond for Seagulls and Sad, Sad Stories at Laurels, Whitley Bay
Best Writer	Ava Pickett for 1536 at Almeida Theatre, London Milly Sweeney for Water Colour at Pitlochry Festival Theatre and Byre Theatre, St Andrews	Nathan Englander for What We Talk About When We Talk About Anne Frank at Marylebone Theatre, London
Best Writer	Ava Pickett for 1536 at Almeida Theatre, London Milly Sweeney for Water Colour at Pitlochry Festival Theatre and Byre Theatre, St Andrews	Danny James King for Miss Myrtle’s Garden at Bush Theatre, London
Best Writer	Ava Pickett for 1536 at Almeida Theatre, London Milly Sweeney for Water Colour at Pitlochry Festival Theatre and Byre Theatre, St Andrews	Saana Sze for Belly of the Beast at Finborough Theatre, London
Best Writer	Ava Pickett for 1536 at Almeida Theatre, London Milly Sweeney for Water Colour at Pitlochry Festival Theatre and Byre Theatre, St Andrews	Nancy Netherwood for Radiant Boy: A Haunting at Southwark Playhouse, London
Best Composer, Lyricist or Book Writer	Yve Blake for Fangirls at Lyric Hammersmith, London	Bryn Christopher, James Cooper, Martin Batchelar for Lovestuck at Theatre Royal Stratford East, London
Best Composer, Lyricist or Book Writer	Yve Blake for Fangirls at Lyric Hammersmith, London	Nicola and Rosie Dempsey for One Man Musical by Flo & Joan at Pleasance Dome, Edinburgh
Best West End Debut Performer	Rachel Zegler for Evita at London Palladium	Heather Agyepong for Shifters at Duke of York’s Theatre
Best West End Debut Performer	Rachel Zegler for Evita at London Palladium	Samuel Brewer for Oedipus at Wyndham’s Theatre
Best West End Debut Performer	Rachel Zegler for Evita at London Palladium	Georgie Buckland for The Devil Wears Prada at Dominion Theatre
Best West End Debut Performer	Rachel Zegler for Evita at London Palladium	Tosin Cole for Shifters at Duke of York’s Theatre
Best West End Debut Performer	Rachel Zegler for Evita at London Palladium	Emma Flynn for Clueless the Musical at Trafalgar Theatre
Best West End Debut Performer	Rachel Zegler for Evita at London Palladium	Diego Andres Rodriguez for Evita at London Palladium
Best West End Debut Performer	Rachel Zegler for Evita at London Palladium	Kat Ronney for Titanique at Criterion Theatre
Best Creative West End Debut	Mark Rosenblatt for Giant at Harold Pinter Theatre	Eline Arbo for The Years at Harold Pinter Theatre
Best Creative West End Debut	Mark Rosenblatt for Giant at Harold Pinter Theatre	Tye Blue, Marla Mindelle, Constantine Rousouli for Titanique at Criterion Theatre
Best Creative West End Debut	Mark Rosenblatt for Giant at Harold Pinter Theatre	Darren Clark, Jethro Compton for The Curious Case of Benjamin Button at Ambassadors Theatre
Best Creative West End Debut	Mark Rosenblatt for Giant at Harold Pinter Theatre	Justin Craig for Stereophonic at Duke of York’s Theatre
Best Creative West End Debut	Mark Rosenblatt for Giant at Harold Pinter Theatre	Benedict Lombe for Shifters at Duke of York’s Theatre
Best Creative West End Debut	Mark Rosenblatt for Giant at Harold Pinter Theatre	Amit Sharma for Retrograde at Apollo Theatre

=== 2024 ===
Award	Winner	Nominees
Best Performer in a Play	Ellie-May Sheridan for London Tide at National Theatre, London	Deborah Ayorinde for Wedding Band: A Love/Hate Story in Black and White at Lyric Hammersmith, London
Best Performer in a Play	Ellie-May Sheridan for London Tide at National Theatre, London	Imogen Elliott for The Voice of the Turtle at Jermyn Street Theatre, London
Best Performer in a Play	Ellie-May Sheridan for London Tide at National Theatre, London	Kasper Hilton-Hille for That Face at Orange Tree Theatre, London
Best Performer in a Play	Ellie-May Sheridan for London Tide at National Theatre, London	Gareth John for Housemates at Sherman Theatre, Cardiff
Best Performer in a Play	Ellie-May Sheridan for London Tide at National Theatre, London	Louis McCartney for Stranger Things: The First Shadow at Phoenix Theatre, London
Best Performer in a Play	Ellie-May Sheridan for London Tide at National Theatre, London	Nadia Parkes for The House Party at Chichester Festival Theatre, Chichester
Best Performer in a Play	Ellie-May Sheridan for London Tide at National Theatre, London	Taylor Russell for The Effect at National Theatre, London
Best Performer in a Musical	Jeevan Braich for Starlight Express at Troubadour Wembley Park Theatre, London	Scarlett Ayers for The Verge of Forever at The Other Palace, London
Best Performer in a Musical	Jeevan Braich for Starlight Express at Troubadour Wembley Park Theatre, London	Laura Dawkes for Frozen at Theatre Royal Drury Lane, London
Best Performer in a Musical	Jeevan Braich for Starlight Express at Troubadour Wembley Park Theatre, London	Myles Frost for MJ the Musical at Prince Edward Theatre, London
Best Performer in a Musical	Jeevan Braich for Starlight Express at Troubadour Wembley Park Theatre, London	Joshua Ginsberg for Cable Street at Southwark Playhouse Borough, London
Best Performer in a Musical	Jeevan Braich for Starlight Express at Troubadour Wembley Park Theatre, London	Grace Hodgett Young for Sunset Boulevard at Savoy Theatre, London
Best Director	Sophie Drake for The Bleeding Tree at Southwark Playhouse Borough, London	Emily Foran for Little Women at Lyric Theatre, Belfast
Best Director	Sophie Drake for The Bleeding Tree at Southwark Playhouse Borough, London	Ellie Coote for 42 Balloons by The Lowry, Salford
Best Designer	Nathan Amzi and Joe Ransom for Sunset Boulevard at Savoy Theatre, London	Ellie Koslowsky for Vegetables in London
Best Designer	Nathan Amzi and Joe Ransom for Sunset Boulevard at Savoy Theatre, London	Nadya Sayapina, Anastasiya Ryabova, Lidiia Dresch-Pyshna and Dmytro Guk for King Stakh’s Wild Hunt at Barbican Theatre, London
Best Designer	Nathan Amzi and Joe Ransom for Sunset Boulevard at Savoy Theatre, London	Skylar Turnbull Hurd for These Demons at Theatre503, London
Best Writer	Azuka Oforka for The Women of Llanrumney at Sherman Theatre, Cardiff Sam Grabiner for Boys on the Verge of Tears by Soho Theatre, London	Martha Loader for Bindweed at Mercury Theatre, Colchester
Best Writer	Azuka Oforka for The Women of Llanrumney at Sherman Theatre, Cardiff Sam Grabiner for Boys on the Verge of Tears by Soho Theatre, London	Harry McDonald for Foam at Finborough Theatre, London
Best Writer	Azuka Oforka for The Women of Llanrumney at Sherman Theatre, Cardiff Sam Grabiner for Boys on the Verge of Tears by Soho Theatre, London	Hannah Morley for We Could All Be Perfect at Sheffield Theatres, Sheffield
Best Writer	Azuka Oforka for The Women of Llanrumney at Sherman Theatre, Cardiff Sam Grabiner for Boys on the Verge of Tears by Soho Theatre, London	Anastasia Osei-Kuffour for Love Steps at Omnibus Theatre, London
Best Composer, Lyricist or Book Writer	Jack Godfrey for 42 Balloons at The Lowry, Salford	Ahmed Abdullahi Gallab for The Enormous Crocodile at Leeds Playhouse, Leeds
Best Composer, Lyricist or Book Writer	Jack Godfrey for 42 Balloons at The Lowry, Salford	Nick Butcher and Tom Ling for The Little Big Things at @sohoplace, London
Best Composer, Lyricist or Book Writer	Jack Godfrey for 42 Balloons at The Lowry, Salford	Elvis Costello for Cold War at Almeida Theatre, London
Best West End Debut Performer	Jack Wolfe for Next to Normal at Wyndham’s Theatre, London	Francesca Amewudah-Rivers for Romeo and Juliet at Duke of York’s Theatre, London
Best West End Debut Performer	Jack Wolfe for Next to Normal at Wyndham’s Theatre, London	Will Close for Dear England at National Theatre, London
Best West End Debut Performer	Jack Wolfe for Next to Normal at Wyndham’s Theatre, London	Billy Crudup for Harry Clarke at Ambassadors Theatre, London
Best West End Debut Performer	Jack Wolfe for Next to Normal at Wyndham’s Theatre, London	Grace Hodgett Young for Sunset Boulevard at Savoy Theatre, London
Best West End Debut Performer	Jack Wolfe for Next to Normal at Wyndham’s Theatre, London	Toheeb Jimoh for Player Kings at Noël Coward Theatre
Best West End Debut Performer	Jack Wolfe for Next to Normal at Wyndham’s Theatre, London	Ed Larkin for The Little Big Things at @sohoplace, London
Best West End Debut Performer	Jack Wolfe for Next to Normal at Wyndham’s Theatre, London	Louis McCartney for Stranger Things: The First Shadow at Phoenix Theatre, London
Best Creative West End Debut	Daniel Bailey for Red Pitch at @sohoplace	Jim Barne and Kit Buchan for Two Strangers (Carry a Cake Across New York) at Criterion Theatre
Best Creative West End Debut	Daniel Bailey for Red Pitch at @sohoplace	Marcelo Dos Santos for Backstairs Billy at Duke of York’s Theatre
Best Creative West End Debut	Daniel Bailey for Red Pitch at @sohoplace	Kip Williams for The Picture of Dorian Gray at Theatre Royal Haymarket
Best Creative West End Debut	Daniel Bailey for Red Pitch at @sohoplace	Brian Yorkey and Tom Kitt for Next to Normal at Wyndham’s Theatre

=== 2023 ===
Award	Winner	Nominees
Best Performer in a Play	Elan Davies for Imrie at Sherman Theatre, Cardiff & Isobel Thom for I, Joan at Shakespeare's Globe, London	Bukky Bakray for Sleepova at Bush Theatre, London
Best Performer in a Play	Elan Davies for Imrie at Sherman Theatre, Cardiff & Isobel Thom for I, Joan at Shakespeare's Globe, London	Rita Bernard-Shaw for Trouble in Butetown at Donmar Warehouse, London
Best Performer in a Play	Elan Davies for Imrie at Sherman Theatre, Cardiff & Isobel Thom for I, Joan at Shakespeare's Globe, London	Natalie Blair for Spring and Port Wine at Octagon Theatre, Bolton
Best Performer in a Play	Elan Davies for Imrie at Sherman Theatre, Cardiff & Isobel Thom for I, Joan at Shakespeare's Globe, London	Rhian Blundell for Let the Right One In at Royal Exchange Theatre, Manchester
Best Performer in a Play	Elan Davies for Imrie at Sherman Theatre, Cardiff & Isobel Thom for I, Joan at Shakespeare's Globe, London	Rilwan Abiola Owokoniran for The Importance of Being Earnest at Leeds Playhouse and touring
Best Performer in a Play	Elan Davies for Imrie at Sherman Theatre, Cardiff & Isobel Thom for I, Joan at Shakespeare's Globe, London	Daniel Rock for Richard The Second at Omnibus Theatre, London and touring
Best Performer in a Musical	Jessica Lee for Miss Saigon at Crucible Theatre, Sheffield	Liv Andrusier for Ride at Charing Cross Theatre, London
Best Performer in a Musical	Jessica Lee for Miss Saigon at Crucible Theatre, Sheffield	Josh Barnett for Newsies at Troubadour Wembley Park Theatre, London
Best Performer in a Musical	Jessica Lee for Miss Saigon at Crucible Theatre, Sheffield	Arcangelo Ciulla for Newsies at Troubadour Wembley Park Theatre, London
Best Performer in a Musical	Jessica Lee for Miss Saigon at Crucible Theatre, Sheffield	Carla Dixon-Hernandez for Mrs Doubtfire at Shaftesbury Theatre, London
Best Performer in a Musical	Jessica Lee for Miss Saigon at Crucible Theatre, Sheffield	Drew Hylton for Unexpected Twist: An Oliver Twisted Tale at Royal and Derngate, Northampton and touring
Best Performer in a Musical	Jessica Lee for Miss Saigon at Crucible Theatre, Sheffield	Maisie Smith for Strictly Ballroom, Churchill Theatre, Bromley and touring
Best Director	Emily Ling Williams for A Playlist for the Revolution at Bush Theatre, London	Daniel Blake for Bones at Park Theatre, London
Best Director	Emily Ling Williams for A Playlist for the Revolution at Bush Theatre, London	Indiana Lown-Collins for The Solid Life of Sugar Water at Orange Tree Theatre, London
Best Director	Emily Ling Williams for A Playlist for the Revolution at Bush Theatre, London	Denzel Westley-Sanderson for The Importance of Being Earnest at Leeds Playhouse and touring
Best Designer	Andrea Scott (video) for My Neighbour Totoro at Barbican Theatre, London	Carly Brownbridge (set & costume) for Agatha at Theatre503, London
Best Designer	Andrea Scott (video) for My Neighbour Totoro at Barbican Theatre, London	Peter Butler (set & costume) for The Shape of Things at Park Theatre, London
Best Composer, Lyricist or Book Writer	Michael R Jackson for A Strange Loop at Barbican Theatre, London	Gerel Falconer for Alice in Wonderland at Brixton House, London
Best Composer, Lyricist or Book Writer	Michael R Jackson for A Strange Loop at Barbican Theatre, London	Jenny Moore for Robin Hood: The Legend. Re-written at Regent's Park Open Air Theatre, London
Best Composer, Lyricist or Book Writer	Michael R Jackson for A Strange Loop at Barbican Theatre, London	Lilly Pollard for Sugar Coat at Southwark Playhouse, London
Best Writer	Anoushka Lucas for Elephant at Bush Theatre, London	Sasha Hails for Possession at Arcola Theatre, London
Best Writer	Anoushka Lucas for Elephant at Bush Theatre, London	Lenny Henry for August in England at Bush Theatre, London
Best Writer	Anoushka Lucas for Elephant at Bush Theatre, London	Jennifer Lunn for Es & Flo at Wales Millennium Centre, Cardiff
Best Writer	Anoushka Lucas for Elephant at Bush Theatre, London	Richard Mylan for Sorter at Swansea Grand Theatre
Best Writer	Anoushka Lucas for Elephant at Bush Theatre, London	Zak Zarafshan for The Boys Are Kissing at Theatre503, London
Best West End Debut Performer	Rose Ayling-Ellis for As You Like It at @sohoplace	Emily Fairn for Brokeback Mountain at @sohoplace
Best West End Debut Performer	Rose Ayling-Ellis for As You Like It at @sohoplace	Mike Faist for Brokeback Mountain at @sohoplace
Best West End Debut Performer	Rose Ayling-Ellis for As You Like It at @sohoplace	Kyle Ramar Freeman for A Strange Loop at Barbican Theatre
Best West End Debut Performer	Rose Ayling-Ellis for As You Like It at @sohoplace	Gabriel Howell for The Unfriend at Criterion Theatre
Best West End Debut Performer	Rose Ayling-Ellis for As You Like It at @sohoplace	Paul Mescal for A Streetcar Named Desire at Phoenix Theatre
Best West End Debut Performer	Rose Ayling-Ellis for As You Like It at @sohoplace	Zachary Quinto for Best of Enemies at Noël Coward Theatre
Best West End Debut Performer	Rose Ayling-Ellis for As You Like It at @sohoplace	Samira Wiley for Blues for an Alabama Sky at The National Theatre
Best Creative West End Debut	Tingying Dong (Sound Designer) for The Crucible at National Theatre and Gielgud Theatre and Rob Madge (Writer) for My Son's a Queer, (But What Can You Do?) at Garrick Theatre and Ambassadors Theatre	Joe Bunker (Musical Director) for Operation Mincemeat at Fortune Theatre
Best Creative West End Debut	Tingying Dong (Sound Designer) for The Crucible at National Theatre and Gielgud Theatre and Rob Madge (Writer) for My Son's a Queer, (But What Can You Do?) at Garrick Theatre and Ambassadors Theatre	David Cumming, Felix Hagan, Natasha Hodgson and Zoë Roberts (SpitLip) (Composer, Lyricist & Book Writer) for Operation Mincemeat at Fortune Theatre
Best Creative West End Debut	Tingying Dong (Sound Designer) for The Crucible at National Theatre and Gielgud Theatre and Rob Madge (Writer) for My Son's a Queer, (But What Can You Do?) at Garrick Theatre and Ambassadors Theatre	Michael R Jackson (Composer, Lyricist & Book Writer) for A Strange Loop at Barbican Theatre
Best Creative West End Debut	Tingying Dong (Sound Designer) for The Crucible at National Theatre and Gielgud Theatre and Rob Madge (Writer) for My Son's a Queer, (But What Can You Do?) at Garrick Theatre and Ambassadors Theatre	Scott Le Crass (Director) for Rose at Ambassadors Theatre

=== 2022 ===
Award	Winner	Nominees
Best Performer in a Play	Elisabeth Gunawan for Unforgettable Girl at Volia! Europe Theatre Festival, London & Ensemble of For Black Boys Who Have Considered Suicide When the Hue Gets Too Heavy at the New Diorama and Royal Court, London (Mark Akintimehin, Emmanuel Akwafo, Nnabiko Ejimofor, Darragh Hand, Aruna Jalloh, Kaine Lawrence)	Samuel Creasey for Book of Dust at Bridge Theatre, London
Best Performer in a Play	Elisabeth Gunawan for Unforgettable Girl at Volia! Europe Theatre Festival, London & Ensemble of For Black Boys Who Have Considered Suicide When the Hue Gets Too Heavy at the New Diorama and Royal Court, London (Mark Akintimehin, Emmanuel Akwafo, Nnabiko Ejimofor, Darragh Hand, Aruna Jalloh, Kaine Lawrence)	Kudzai Mangombe for Malindadzimu at Hampstead Theatre, London
Best Performer in a Play	Elisabeth Gunawan for Unforgettable Girl at Volia! Europe Theatre Festival, London & Ensemble of For Black Boys Who Have Considered Suicide When the Hue Gets Too Heavy at the New Diorama and Royal Court, London (Mark Akintimehin, Emmanuel Akwafo, Nnabiko Ejimofor, Darragh Hand, Aruna Jalloh, Kaine Lawrence)	Saba Shiraz for An Adventure the Octagon Theatre, Bolton
Best Performer in a Play	Elisabeth Gunawan for Unforgettable Girl at Volia! Europe Theatre Festival, London & Ensemble of For Black Boys Who Have Considered Suicide When the Hue Gets Too Heavy at the New Diorama and Royal Court, London (Mark Akintimehin, Emmanuel Akwafo, Nnabiko Ejimofor, Darragh Hand, Aruna Jalloh, Kaine Lawrence)	Tommy Sim’aan for Starcrossed at Wilton's Music Hall, London
Best Performer in a Play	Elisabeth Gunawan for Unforgettable Girl at Volia! Europe Theatre Festival, London & Ensemble of For Black Boys Who Have Considered Suicide When the Hue Gets Too Heavy at the New Diorama and Royal Court, London (Mark Akintimehin, Emmanuel Akwafo, Nnabiko Ejimofor, Darragh Hand, Aruna Jalloh, Kaine Lawrence)	Joe Usher for Rock / Paper / Scissors at Sheffield Theatres
Best Performer in a Play	Elisabeth Gunawan for Unforgettable Girl at Volia! Europe Theatre Festival, London & Ensemble of For Black Boys Who Have Considered Suicide When the Hue Gets Too Heavy at the New Diorama and Royal Court, London (Mark Akintimehin, Emmanuel Akwafo, Nnabiko Ejimofor, Darragh Hand, Aruna Jalloh, Kaine Lawrence)	Michael Workeye for House of Ife at the Bush Theatre, London
Best Performer in a Play	Elisabeth Gunawan for Unforgettable Girl at Volia! Europe Theatre Festival, London & Ensemble of For Black Boys Who Have Considered Suicide When the Hue Gets Too Heavy at the New Diorama and Royal Court, London (Mark Akintimehin, Emmanuel Akwafo, Nnabiko Ejimofor, Darragh Hand, Aruna Jalloh, Kaine Lawrence)	Dewi Wykes for Petula at National Theatre Wales
Best Performer in a Musical	Elijah Ferreira for Hedwig and the Angry Inch at Leeds Playhouse	Hugh Coles for Back to the Future at the Adelphi Theatre, London
Best Performer in a Musical	Elijah Ferreira for Hedwig and the Angry Inch at Leeds Playhouse	Ben Joyce for Jersey Boys at Trafalgar Theatre, London
Best Performer in a Musical	Elijah Ferreira for Hedwig and the Angry Inch at Leeds Playhouse	Bella Maclean for Spring Awakening at the Almeida, London
Best Performer in a Musical	Elijah Ferreira for Hedwig and the Angry Inch at Leeds Playhouse	Joe Pitts for Spring Awakening at the Almeida, London
Best Director	Monique Touko for Malindadzimu at Hampstead Theatre, London	Anthony Almeida for Cat on a Hot Tin Roof at Curve, Leicester
Best Director	Monique Touko for Malindadzimu at Hampstead Theatre, London	Alice Fitzgerald for Purple Snowflakes and Titty Wanks at the Royal Court, London
Best Designer	Rose Revitt (set and costume) for Dr Korczak’s Example at Leeds Playhouse	Liam Bunster (set and costume) for The Taming of the Shrew at Shakespeare's Globe, London
Best Designer	Rose Revitt (set and costume) for Dr Korczak’s Example at Leeds Playhouse	Andrew Exeter (lighting) for High Fidelity at the Turbine Theatre, London
Best Composer or Lyricist	TK Hay (set and costume) for An Adventure at the Octagon Theatre, Bolton	Caitlin Mawhinney (set and costume) for My Voice Was Heard But It Was Ignored/Teechers Leavers at Leeds Playhouse/Hull Truck
Best Composer or Lyricist	TK Hay (set and costume) for An Adventure at the Octagon Theatre, Bolton	Liz Whitbread (set and costume) for Favour at the Bush Theatre, London
Best Composer, Lyricist or Book Writer	John Patrick Elliott for Cruise at the Duchess Theatre, London	Jordan Paul Clarke & Francesca Forristal for Public Domain at Vaudeville Theatre, London
Best Composer, Lyricist or Book Writer	John Patrick Elliott for Cruise at the Duchess Theatre, London	Lauryn Redding for Bloody Elle at the Royal Exchange, Manchester
Best Writer	Tyrell Williams for Red Pitch at the Bush Theatre, London	Kemi-Bo Jacobs for All White Everything But Me at the Alphabetti Theatre, Newcastle
Best Writer	Tyrell Williams for Red Pitch at the Bush Theatre, London	Eilidh Loan for Moorcroft at the Tron Theatre, Glasgow
Best West End Debut Performer	Jodie Comer for Prima Facie the Harold Pinter Theatre	Lizzie Annis for The Glass Menagerie at Duke of York's Theatre
Best West End Debut Performer	Jodie Comer for Prima Facie the Harold Pinter Theatre	Emilia Clarke for The Seagull the Harold Pinter Theatre
Best West End Debut Performer	Jodie Comer for Prima Facie the Harold Pinter Theatre	Hugh Coles for Back to the Future at Adelphi Theatre
Best West End Debut Performer	Jodie Comer for Prima Facie the Harold Pinter Theatre	Emma Corrin for Anna X the Harold Pinter Theatre
Best West End Debut Performer	Jodie Comer for Prima Facie the Harold Pinter Theatre	Sutton Foster for Anything Goes at the Barbican
Best West End Debut Performer	Jodie Comer for Prima Facie the Harold Pinter Theatre	Hannah Jarrett-Scott for Pride and Prejudice* (*sort of) at the Criterion
Best West End Debut Performer	Jodie Comer for Prima Facie the Harold Pinter Theatre	Ben Joyce for Jersey Boys at Trafalgar Studios
Best Creative West End Debut	Julia Cheng (choreographer) for Cabaret at the Playhouse Theatre, London	Tacita Dean (designer) for The Dante Project at the Royal Opera House
Best Creative West End Debut	Julia Cheng (choreographer) for Cabaret at the Playhouse Theatre, London	Jack Holden (writer) for Cruise at the Duchess Theatre
Best Creative West End Debut	Julia Cheng (choreographer) for Cabaret at the Playhouse Theatre, London	Yasmin Joseph (writer) for J'Ouvert at the Harold Pinter Theatre
Best Creative West End Debut	Julia Cheng (choreographer) for Cabaret at the Playhouse Theatre, London	Isobel McArthur (writer) for Pride and Prejudice* (*sort of) at the Criterion
Best Creative West End Debut	Julia Cheng (choreographer) for Cabaret at the Playhouse Theatre, London	Rebekah Murrell (director) for J'Ouvert at the Harold Pinter Theatre

=== 2020 ===
Award	Winner	Nominees
Best Performer in a Play	Daniel Monks for Teenage Dick at the Donmar Warehouse, London & Rachel Nwokoro for Little Baby Jesus at the Orange Tree Theatre, London	Saida Ahmed for Little Miss Burden at the Bunker, London
Best Performer in a Play	Daniel Monks for Teenage Dick at the Donmar Warehouse, London & Rachel Nwokoro for Little Baby Jesus at the Orange Tree Theatre, London	Brooklyn Melvin for Oliver Twist at Leeds Playhouse (in a co-production with Ramps on the Moon)
Best Performer in a Play	Daniel Monks for Teenage Dick at the Donmar Warehouse, London & Rachel Nwokoro for Little Baby Jesus at the Orange Tree Theatre, London	Jessica Rhodes for The Sugar Syndrome at the Orange Tree Theatre, London
Best Performer in a Play	Daniel Monks for Teenage Dick at the Donmar Warehouse, London & Rachel Nwokoro for Little Baby Jesus at the Orange Tree Theatre, London	Khai Shaw for Little Baby Jesus at the Orange Tree Theatre, London
Best Performer in a Play	Daniel Monks for Teenage Dick at the Donmar Warehouse, London & Rachel Nwokoro for Little Baby Jesus at the Orange Tree Theatre, London	Bobby Stallwood for Faith, Hope and Charity at the National Theatre, London
Best Performer in a Musical	Shan Ako for Les Misérables at the Sondheim Theatre, London & Sam Tutty for Dear Evan Hansen at the Noël Coward Theatre, London	Lucy Anderson for Dear Evan Hansen at the Noël Coward Theatre, London
Best Performer in a Musical	Shan Ako for Les Misérables at the Sondheim Theatre, London & Sam Tutty for Dear Evan Hansen at the Noël Coward Theatre, London	Chase Brown for Mame at the Hope Mill Theatre, Manchester
Best Performer in a Musical	Shan Ako for Les Misérables at the Sondheim Theatre, London & Sam Tutty for Dear Evan Hansen at the Noël Coward Theatre, London	Oli Higginson for The Last Five Years at the Southwark Playhouse, London
Best Performer in a Musical	Shan Ako for Les Misérables at the Sondheim Theatre, London & Sam Tutty for Dear Evan Hansen at the Noël Coward Theatre, London	Adriana Ivelisse for West Side Story at Curve, Leicester
Best Performer in a Musical	Shan Ako for Les Misérables at the Sondheim Theatre, London & Sam Tutty for Dear Evan Hansen at the Noël Coward Theatre, London	Tom Noyes for Preludes at the Southwark Playhouse, London
Best Performer in a Musical	Shan Ako for Les Misérables at the Sondheim Theatre, London & Sam Tutty for Dear Evan Hansen at the Noël Coward Theatre, London	Bethany Tennick for Islander at the Southwark Playhouse, London
Best Director	Martha Kiss Perrone for When It Breaks It Burns at the Battersea Arts Centre, London	Georgia Green for The Mikvah Project at the Orange Tree Theatre, London
Best Director	Martha Kiss Perrone for When It Breaks It Burns at the Battersea Arts Centre, London	Alex Sutton for Preludes at the Southwark Playhouse, London
Best Designer	Rose Revitt (set and costume) for Dr Korczak's Example at Leeds Playhouse	Liam Bunster (set and costume) for The Taming of the Shrew at Shakespeare's Globe, London
Best Designer	Rose Revitt (set and costume) for Dr Korczak's Example at Leeds Playhouse	Andrew Exeter (lighting) for High Fidelity at the Turbine Theatre, London
Best Composer or Lyricist	Jim Barne and Kit Buchan for The Season at the New Wolsey Theatre, Ipswich and Royal and Derngate, Northampton	Jherek Bischoff for The Ocean at the End of the Lane at the National Theatre, London
Best Composer or Lyricist	Jim Barne and Kit Buchan for The Season at the New Wolsey Theatre, Ipswich and Royal and Derngate, Northampton	Robbie Williams for The Boy in the Dress at the Royal Shakespeare Company, Stratford-upon-Avon
Best Writer	Temi Wilkey for The High Table at the Bush Theatre, London (in a co-production with Birmingham Rep)	Samuel Bailey for Shook at the Southwark Playhouse, London
Best Writer	Temi Wilkey for The High Table at the Bush Theatre, London (in a co-production with Birmingham Rep)	Mari Izzard for Hela at The Other Room, Cardiff
Best Writer	Temi Wilkey for The High Table at the Bush Theatre, London (in a co-production with Birmingham Rep)	Eleanor Tindall for Before I Was a Bear at The Bunker, London
Best West End Debut Performer	Sam Tutty for Dear Evan Hansen at the Noël Coward Theatre	Shan Ako for Les Misérables at the Sondheim Theatre
Best West End Debut Performer	Sam Tutty for Dear Evan Hansen at the Noël Coward Theatre	David Mitchell for The Upstart Crow at the Gielgud Theatre
Best West End Debut Performer	Sam Tutty for Dear Evan Hansen at the Noël Coward Theatre	Daniel Monks for Teenage Dick at the Donmar Warehouse
Best West End Debut Performer	Sam Tutty for Dear Evan Hansen at the Noël Coward Theatre	Samantha Pauly for Evita at Regent's Park Open Air Theatre
Best West End Debut Performer	Sam Tutty for Dear Evan Hansen at the Noël Coward Theatre	Wendell Pierce for Death of a Salesman at the Piccadilly Theatre
Best West End Debut Performer	Sam Tutty for Dear Evan Hansen at the Noël Coward Theatre	Aimee Lou Wood for Uncle Vanya at the Harold Pinter Theatre
Best Creative West End Debut	Femi Temowo (composer) for Death of a Salesman at the Piccadilly Theatre and for Three Sisters at the National Theatre	Fabian Aloise (choreographer) for Evita at Regent's Park Open Air Theatre
Best Creative West End Debut	Femi Temowo (composer) for Death of a Salesman at the Piccadilly Theatre and for Three Sisters at the National Theatre	Nadia Latif (director) for Fairview at the Young Vic Theatre
Best Creative West End Debut	Femi Temowo (composer) for Death of a Salesman at the Piccadilly Theatre and for Three Sisters at the National Theatre	Benj Pasek, Justin Paul and Steven Levenson (composer, lyricist & book) for Dear Evan Hansen at the Noël Coward Theatre
Best Creative West End Debut	Femi Temowo (composer) for Death of a Salesman at the Piccadilly Theatre and for Three Sisters at the National Theatre	David West Read (book) for & Juliet at the Shaftesbury Theatre

=== 2019 ===
Award	Winner	Nominees
Best Actor in a Play	Jamal Ajala in Ear for Eye, Royal Court	Stuart Campbell in The Hunt, Almeida Theatre
Best Actor in a Play	Jamal Ajala in Ear for Eye, Royal Court	Patrick Gibson in Sweat, Donmar Warehouse and the Gielgud Theatre, London
Best Actor in a Play	Jamal Ajala in Ear for Eye, Royal Court	Ivan Oyik in Blue/Orange, Birmingham Repertory Theatre
Best Actress in a Play	Lauren O'Leary in The Awkward Years, The Other Room, Cardiff	Liv Hill in Top Girls, National Theatre
Best Actress in a Play	Lauren O'Leary in The Awkward Years, The Other Room, Cardiff	Urielle Klein-Mekongo in Yvette, Bush Theatre
Best Actress in a Play	Lauren O'Leary in The Awkward Years, The Other Room, Cardiff	Bea Webster in Mother Courage, Albion Electric Warehouse, Leeds
Best Actor in a Musical	Adam Hugill for Standing at the Sky's Edge, Crucible Theatre, Sheffield	Ryan Hutton in Only Fools and Horses The Musical, Theatre Royal Haymarket
Best Actor in a Musical	Adam Hugill for Standing at the Sky's Edge, Crucible Theatre, Sheffield	Jac Yarrow in Joseph and the Amazing Technicolor Dreamcoat, London Palladium
Best Actress in a Musical	Danielle Fiamanya in The Color Purple, Curve, Leicester and Birmingham Hippodrome	Georgina Ambrey in My Mother Said I Never Should and The Rise and Fall of Little Voice, Theatre by the Lake, Keswick
Best Actress in a Musical	Danielle Fiamanya in The Color Purple, Curve, Leicester and Birmingham Hippodrome	Maiya Quansah-Breed in Six, Arts Theatre
Best Actress in a Musical	Danielle Fiamanya in The Color Purple, Curve, Leicester and Birmingham Hippodrome	Jarnéia Richard-Noel in Six, Arts Theatre
Best Director	Atri Banerjee for Hobson's Choice, Royal Exchange, Manchester	Tyrone Huntley for Ain't Misbehaving, Mercury Theatre, Colchester
Best Director	Atri Banerjee for Hobson's Choice, Royal Exchange, Manchester	Jade Lewis for Superhoe, Royal Court
Best Director	Atri Banerjee for Hobson's Choice, Royal Exchange, Manchester	Tom Scutt for Berberian Sound Studio, Donmar Warehouse
Best Designer	Evie Gurney for Antony and Cleopatra and The Hunt, National Theatre and Almeida Theatre	Abby Clarke for Beauty and the Beast, Theatre by the Lake, Keswick
Best Designer	Evie Gurney for Antony and Cleopatra and The Hunt, National Theatre and Almeida Theatre	Maxwell Nicholson Lailey for Huddle (Unicorn Theatre)
Best Composer or Lyricist	David Cumming, Felix Hagan, Natasha Hodgson and Zoë Roberts for Operation Mincemeat, New Diorama Theatre	Oran Eldor and Marcus Stevens for Mythic the Musical, Charing Cross Theatre
Best Composer or Lyricist	David Cumming, Felix Hagan, Natasha Hodgson and Zoë Roberts for Operation Mincemeat, New Diorama Theatre	Anaïs Mitchell for Hadestown, National Theatre
Best Composer or Lyricist	David Cumming, Felix Hagan, Natasha Hodgson and Zoë Roberts for Operation Mincemeat, New Diorama Theatre	Femi Temowo for Death of a Salesman, Young Vic
Best Writer	Jasmine Lee-Jones for Seven Methods of Killing Kylie Jenner, Royal Court	Ross Willis for Wolfie, Theatre503
Best Writer	Jasmine Lee-Jones for Seven Methods of Killing Kylie Jenner, Royal Court	Nicôle Lecky for Superhoe, Royal Court
Best Writer	Jasmine Lee-Jones for Seven Methods of Killing Kylie Jenner, Royal Court	Holly Robinson for Soft Animals, Soho Theatre
The Joe Allen Best West End Debut	Jac Yarrow for Joseph and the Amazing Technicolor Dreamcoat, London Palladium	Matthew Broderick in The Starry Messenger, Wyndham's Theatre
The Joe Allen Best West End Debut	Jac Yarrow for Joseph and the Amazing Technicolor Dreamcoat, London Palladium	Andrew Burnap in The Inheritance, Noël Coward Theatre
The Joe Allen Best West End Debut	Jac Yarrow for Joseph and the Amazing Technicolor Dreamcoat, London Palladium	Nathanael Campbell in Come From Away, Phoenix Theatre
The Joe Allen Best West End Debut	Jac Yarrow for Joseph and the Amazing Technicolor Dreamcoat, London Palladium	Saffron Coomber in Emilia, Vaudeville Theatre
The Joe Allen Best West End Debut	Jac Yarrow for Joseph and the Amazing Technicolor Dreamcoat, London Palladium	Sarah Gordy in Jellyfish, National Theatre
The Joe Allen Best West End Debut	Jac Yarrow for Joseph and the Amazing Technicolor Dreamcoat, London Palladium	Samuel H Levine in The Inheritance, Noël Coward Theatre

=== 2018 ===
Award	Winner	Nominees
Best Actor in a Play	Akshay Sharan in The Reluctant Fundamentalist, Yard Theatre, London	Seb Carrington in Summer and Smoke, Almeida Theatre, London
Best Actor in a Play	Akshay Sharan in The Reluctant Fundamentalist, Yard Theatre, London	Chris Walley in The Lieutenant of Inishmore, Noël Coward Theatre, London
Best Actor in a Play	Akshay Sharan in The Reluctant Fundamentalist, Yard Theatre, London	Alex Wilson in The Elephant Man, Bristol Old Vic, Bristol
Best Actress in a Play	Gemma Dobson in Rita, Sue and Bob Too, Octagon Theatre, Bolton	Kitty Archer in One for Sorrow, Royal Court, London
Best Actress in a Play	Gemma Dobson in Rita, Sue and Bob Too, Octagon Theatre, Bolton	Lorna Fitzgerald in The Shadow Factory, NST City, Southampton
Best Actress in a Play	Gemma Dobson in Rita, Sue and Bob Too, Octagon Theatre, Bolton	Grainne O'Mahony in The Elephant Man, Bristol Old Vic, Bristol
Best Actor in a Musical	Louis Gaunt in Oklahoma!, Grange Park Opera, West Horsley	Will Carey in It's Only Life, Union Theatre, London
Best Actor in a Musical	Louis Gaunt in Oklahoma!, Grange Park Opera, West Horsley	Toby Miles in Les Misérables, Queen's Theatre, London
Best Actor in a Musical	Louis Gaunt in Oklahoma!, Grange Park Opera, West Horsley	Simon Oskarsson in Return to the Forbidden Planet, Upstairs at the Gatehouse, London
Best Actress in a Musical	Amara Okereke in Les Misérables, Queen's Theatre, London	Teleri Hughes in Spring Awakening at the Hope Mill Theatre, Manchester
Best Actress in a Musical	Amara Okereke in Les Misérables, Queen's Theatre, London	Eleanor Kane in Fun Home at the Young Vic, London
Best Actress in a Musical	Amara Okereke in Les Misérables, Queen's Theatre, London	Rebecca Mendoza in Hairspray, on tour
Best Director	Katy Rudd for The Almighty Sometimes, Royal Exchange, Manchester	Iwan Lewis for One Minute, the Barn Theatre, Cirencester
Best Director	Katy Rudd for The Almighty Sometimes, Royal Exchange, Manchester	Alexandra Moxon for Wreck at Nottingham Playhouse
Best Director	Katy Rudd for The Almighty Sometimes, Royal Exchange, Manchester	Oscar Pearce for Great Apes at the Arcola Theatre, London
Best Designer	Khadija Raza for Hijabi Monologues, Spun, and Mixtape, Bush Theatre, London, the Arcola Theatre, London and the Royal Exchange, Manchester	Basia Binkowska for Devil with the Blue Dress at the Bunker Theatre, London
Best Designer	Khadija Raza for Hijabi Monologues, Spun, and Mixtape, Bush Theatre, London, the Arcola Theatre, London and the Royal Exchange, Manchester	Fin Redshaw for Pieces of String and Love Me Now, Mercury Theatre, Colchester and the Tristan Bates Theatre, London
Best Designer	Khadija Raza for Hijabi Monologues, Spun, and Mixtape, Bush Theatre, London, the Arcola Theatre, London and the Royal Exchange, Manchester	Jasmine Swan for Hyem, The Passing of Third Floor Back, Hanna and The Sleeper, Theatre503, London, the Finborough Theatre, London, the Arcola Theatre, London, and Rialto Theatre, Brighton
Best Composer or Lyricist	Gus Gowland for Pieces of String, Mercury Theatre, Colchester	Kate Marlais for Abandon, Lyric Hammersmith, London
Best Composer or Lyricist	Gus Gowland for Pieces of String, Mercury Theatre, Colchester	Matt Winkworth for The Assassination of Katie Hopkins, Theatr Clwyd, Mold
Best Writer	Andrew Thompson for In Event of Moone Disaster, Theatre503, London	Georgia Christou for Yous Two, Hampstead Theatre, London
Best Writer	Andrew Thompson for In Event of Moone Disaster, Theatre503, London	Kendall Feaver for The Almighty Sometimes, Royal Exchange, Manchester
Best Writer	Andrew Thompson for In Event of Moone Disaster, Theatre503, London	Natasha Gordon for Nine Night, National Theatre, London
Best Writer	Andrew Thompson for In Event of Moone Disaster, Theatre503, London	Joe White for Mayfly, Orange Tree Theatre, London
The Joe Allen Best West End Debut	Aidan Turner in The Lieutenant of Inishmore, Noël Coward Theatre	Mohammad Amiri for The Jungle at the Playhouse Theatre
The Joe Allen Best West End Debut	Aidan Turner in The Lieutenant of Inishmore, Noël Coward Theatre	Ashley Banjo for Dick Whittington at the London Palladium
The Joe Allen Best West End Debut	Aidan Turner in The Lieutenant of Inishmore, Noël Coward Theatre	Bryan Cranston for Network at the National Theatre
The Joe Allen Best West End Debut	Aidan Turner in The Lieutenant of Inishmore, Noël Coward Theatre	Michelle Greenidge for Nine Night at the National Theatre
The Joe Allen Best West End Debut	Aidan Turner in The Lieutenant of Inishmore, Noël Coward Theatre	John McCrea for Everybody’s Talking About Jamie at the Apollo Theatre
The Joe Allen Best West End Debut	Aidan Turner in The Lieutenant of Inishmore, Noël Coward Theatre	Kelli O'Hara for The King and I at the London Palladium

=== 2017 ===
Award	Winner	Nominees
Best Actor in a Play	Abraham Popoola in Othello at Tobacco Factory Theatre, Bristol	Jack Archer in Nivelli's War at The Lyric Theatre, Belfast
Best Actor in a Play	Abraham Popoola in Othello at Tobacco Factory Theatre, Bristol	TJ Jones in The Seven Acts of Mercy at Swan Theatre, Royal Shakespeare Company, Stratford-upon-Avon
Best Actor in a Play	Abraham Popoola in Othello at Tobacco Factory Theatre, Bristol	Kenneth Omole in Assata Taught Me at the Gate Theatre, London
Best Actress in a Play	Grace Molony in The Country Girls at Minerva Theatre, Chichester	Anya Chalotra in Much Ado About Nothing at Shakespeare's Globe, London
Best Actress in a Play	Grace Molony in The Country Girls at Minerva Theatre, Chichester	Kellan Frankland in The House of Bernarda Alba at Royal Exchange, Manchester
Best Actress in a Play	Grace Molony in The Country Girls at Minerva Theatre, Chichester	Jess Peet in Alice in Wonderland at The Royal Lyceum Theatre, Edinburgh
Best Actor in a Musical	Samuel Thomas in Allegro at Southwark Playhouse, London	Adam J Bernard in Dreamgirls at Savoy Theatre, London
Best Actor in a Musical	Samuel Thomas in Allegro at Southwark Playhouse, London	Ben Hunter in The Girls at Phoenix Theatre, London
Best Actor in a Musical	Samuel Thomas in Allegro at Southwark Playhouse, London	Daniel Urch in 110 in the Shade at Ye Olde Rose and Crown, London
Best Actress in a Musical	Miriam-Teak Lee in On the Town at Regent's Park Open Air Theatre, London	Chloe Carrington in Hair at Hope Mill Theatre, Manchester
Best Actress in a Musical	Miriam-Teak Lee in On the Town at Regent's Park Open Air Theatre, London	Emily Hughes in Fiddler on the Roof at Everyman Theatre, Liverpool
Best Actress in a Musical	Miriam-Teak Lee in On the Town at Regent's Park Open Air Theatre, London	Siena Kelly in On the Town at Regent's Park Open Air Theatre, London
Best Director	Lekan Lawal for Betrayal at Derby Theatre, Derby	Sean Aydon for Richard III at Rosemary Branch Theatre, London
Best Director	Lekan Lawal for Betrayal at Derby Theatre, Derby	Alexander Lass for 46 Beacon at Trafalgar Studios 2, London
Best Director	Lekan Lawal for Betrayal at Derby Theatre, Derby	Lynette Linton for Assata Taught Me at the Gate Theatre, London
Best Designer	Rosie Elnile for The Convert at Gate Theatre, London	Joshua Gadsby for Still Ill at New Diorama Theatre, London
Best Designer	Rosie Elnile for The Convert at Gate Theatre, London	Simon Spencer for The Tempest at Royal Shakespeare Company, Stratford-upon-Avon
Best Designer	Rosie Elnile for The Convert at Gate Theatre, London	Jessica Staton for Extra Yarn at Orange Tree Theatre, London
Best Composer or Lyricist	Dan Gillespie Sells for Everybody's Talking About Jamie at Crucible Theatre, Sheffield	Jonah Brody and MJ Harding for Removal Men at The Yard, London
Best Composer or Lyricist	Dan Gillespie Sells for Everybody's Talking About Jamie at Crucible Theatre, Sheffield	Ruth Chan for Snow in Midsummer at Swan Theatre, Royal Shakespeare Company, Stratford-upon-Avon
Best Composer or Lyricist	Dan Gillespie Sells for Everybody's Talking About Jamie at Crucible Theatre, Sheffield	Stephen Jackson for Roller Diner at Soho Theatre, London
Best Writer	Katherine Soper for Wish List at Royal Exchange, Manchester and Royal Court Theatre, London	Titas Halder for Run the Beast Down at Marlowe Theatre, Canterbury and Finborough Theatre, London
Best Writer	Katherine Soper for Wish List at Royal Exchange, Manchester and Royal Court Theatre, London	Asif Khan for Combustion at Tara Arts, London
Best Writer	Katherine Soper for Wish List at Royal Exchange, Manchester and Royal Court Theatre, London	Victoria Willing for Spring Offensive at Clapham Omnibus, London
The Joe Allen Best West End Debut	Andrew Polec for Bat Out of Hell at London Coliseum	John Boyega in Woyzeck at Old Vic
The Joe Allen Best West End Debut	Andrew Polec for Bat Out of Hell at London Coliseum	Anthony Boyle in Harry Potter and the Cursed Child at The Palace Theatre
The Joe Allen Best West End Debut	Andrew Polec for Bat Out of Hell at London Coliseum	Andy Karl in Groundhog Day at Old Vic
The Joe Allen Best West End Debut	Andrew Polec for Bat Out of Hell at London Coliseum	Audra McDonald in Lady Day at Emerson's Bar and Grill at Wyndham's Theatre
The Joe Allen Best West End Debut	Andrew Polec for Bat Out of Hell at London Coliseum	Imogen Poots in Who's Afraid of Virginia Woolf? at Harold Pinter Theatre
The Joe Allen Best West End Debut	Andrew Polec for Bat Out of Hell at London Coliseum	Amber Riley in Dreamgirls at Savoy Theatre
The Joe Allen Best West End Debut	Andrew Polec for Bat Out of Hell at London Coliseum	Charlie Stemp in Half a Sixpence at Noël Coward Theatre
