= 2024 WhatsOnStage Awards =

British theatre awards

24th WhatsOnStage Awards
- Date: 11 February 2024
- Location: London Palladium
- Hosted by: Melanie La Barrie and Bonnie Langford
- Most wins: Sunset Boulevard (7)
- Most nominations: Guys and Dolls (13)

Television/radio coverage
- Produced by: Alex Wood, Darius Thompson, Alex Parker and Damian Sandys

The 24th WhatsOnStage Awards took place on Sunday 11 February 2024 at the London Palladium.

== Winners and nominees ==
The nominees for the 24th WhatsOnStage Awards were announced on 7 December 2023 by The Time Traveller's Wife stars Hiba Elchikhe and Tim Mahendran at the Apollo Theatre. Voting closed on 11 January 2024.

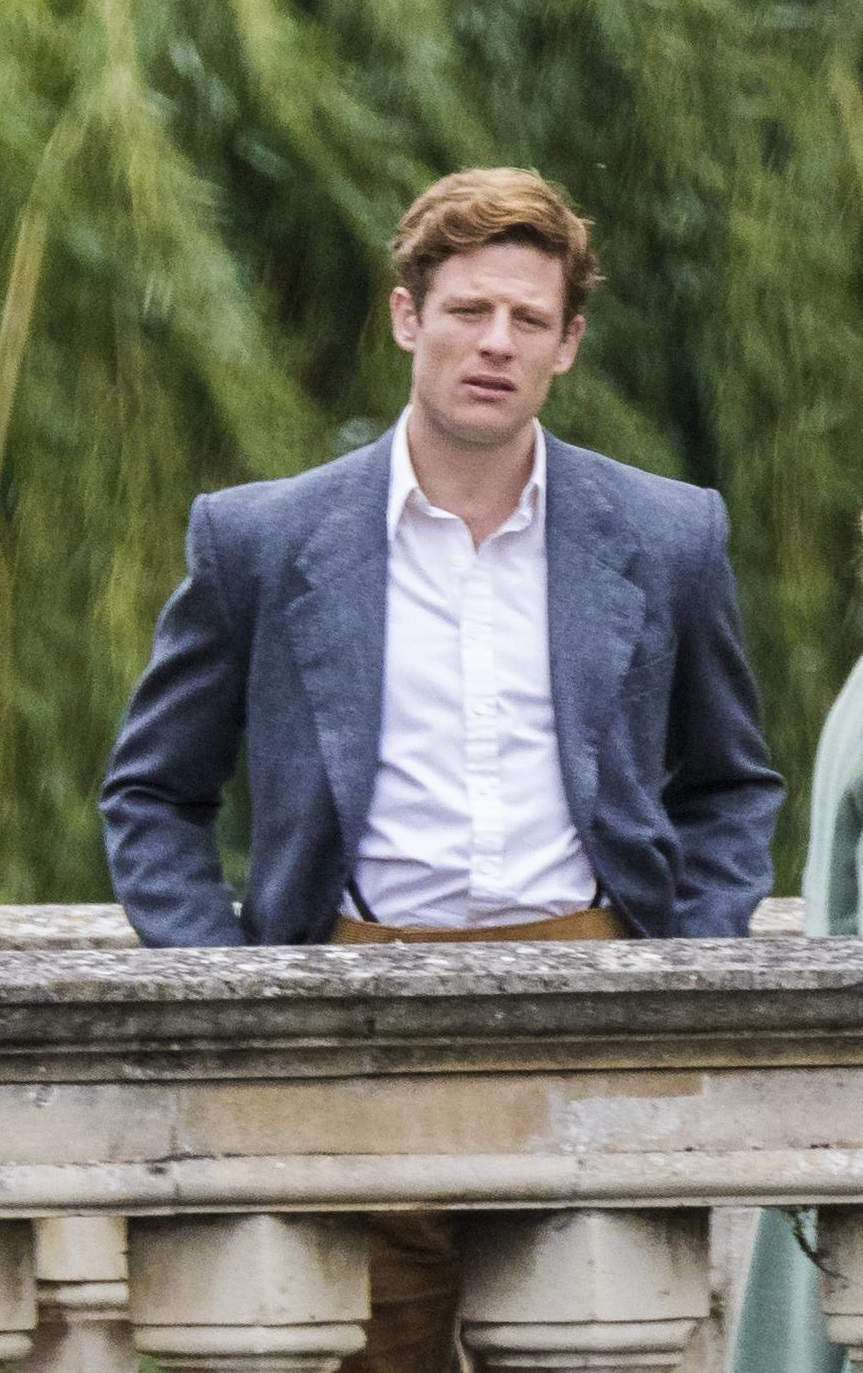
James Norton won Best Performer in a Play for A Little Life.

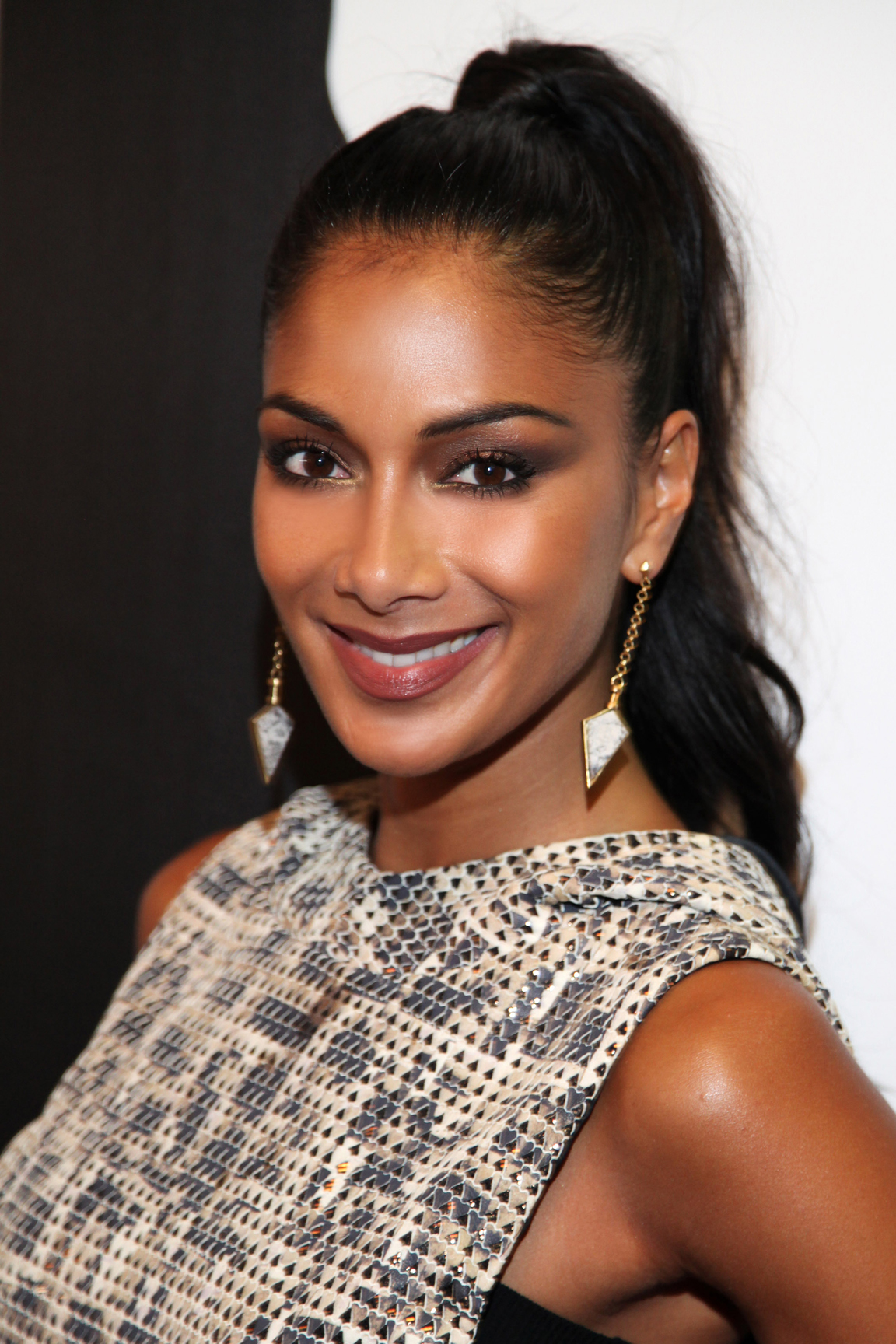
Nicole Scherzinger won Best Performer in a Musical for Sunset Boulevard.

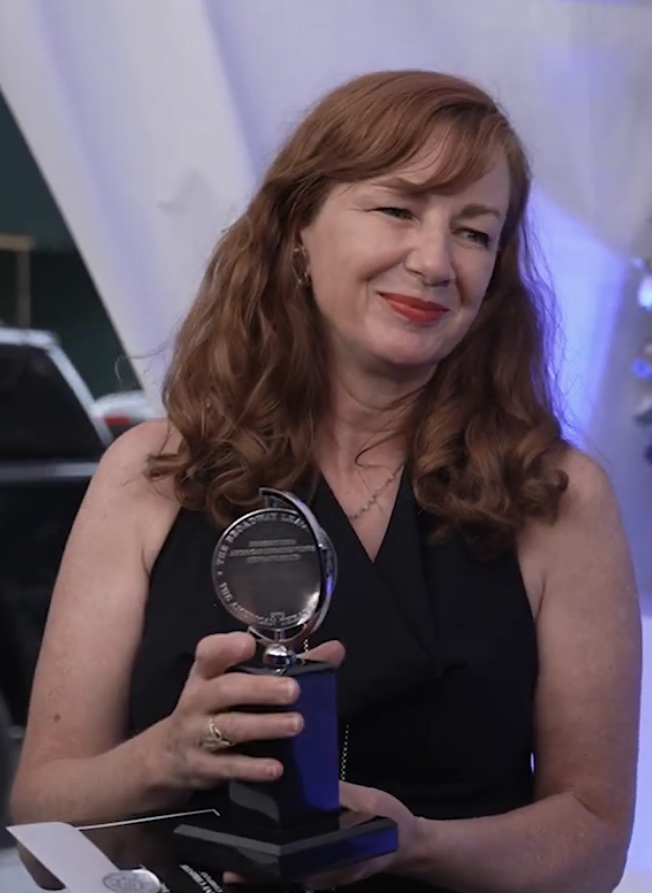
Bunny Christie won Best Set Design for Guys and Dolls.

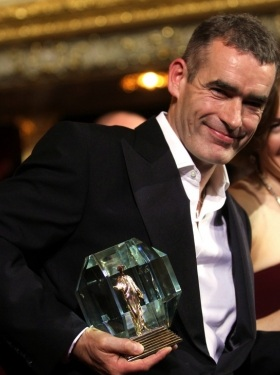
Rufus Norris won the Special Award for Services to UK Theatre.

| Best New Play | Best New Musical |
|---|---|
| Stranger Things: The First Shadow; A Little Life; Cowbois; Dear England; Hamnet; The Motive and the Cue | Operation Mincemeat; The Little Big Things; Mrs Doubtfire; Next to Normal; Newsies; The Time Traveller's Wife |
| Best Play Revival | Best Musical Revival |
| VANYA; A Streetcar Named Desire; The Effect; The Merchant of Venice 1936; The Pillowman; Shirley Valentine | Guys and Dolls; La Cage aux Folles; Lord of the Rings; The Sound of Music; Sunset Boulevard; The Wizard of Oz |
| Best Performer in a Play | Best Supporting Performer in a Play |
| James Norton, A Little Life; Paapa Essiedu, The Effect; Joseph Fiennes, Dear England; Taylor Russell, The Effect; Andrew Scott, VANYA; Sheridan Smith, Shirley Valentine | Luke Thompson, A Little Life; Michele Austin, The Effect; Will Close, Dear England; Bryony Corrigan, I, Daniel Blake; Zubin Varla, A Little Life; Anjana Vasan, A Streetcar Named Desire |
| Best Performer in a Musical | Best Supporting Performer in a Musical |
| Nicole Scherzinger, Sunset Boulevard; Michael Ahomka-Lindsay, Newsies; Natasha Hodgson, Operation Mincemeat; Ed Larkin, The Little Big Things; Caissie Levy, Next to Normal; Marisha Wallace, Guys and Dolls | Jack Wolfe, Next to Normal; Aynrand Ferrer, Miss Saigon; Jak Malone, Operation Mincemeat; Jason Manford, The Wizard of Oz; Cedric Neal, Guys and Dolls; Amy Trigg, The Little Big Things |
| Best Takeover Performance | Best Professional Debut Performance |
| Aimee Lou Wood, Cabaret; Karis Anderson, TINA – The Tina Turner Musical; Cory English, Back to the Future: The Musical; Mason Alexander Park, Cabaret; Lucy St. Louis, Wicked; Rebecca Lucy Taylor, Cabaret | Grace Hodgett-Young, Sunset Boulevard; Rita Bernard-Shaw, Trouble in Butetown; Laura Dawkes, Frozen; Lou Henry, SIX; Louis McCartney, Stranger Things: The First Shadow; Andrew Richardson, Guys and Dolls |
| Best Direction | Best Musical Direction/Supervision |
| Jamie Lloyd, Sunset Boulevard; Polly Findlay, Assassins; Rebecca Frecknall, A Streetcar Named Desire; Rupert Goold, Dear England; Nicholas Hytner, Guys and Dolls; Sam Mendes, The Motive and the Cue | Alan Williams, Sunset Boulevard; Mark Aspinall and Sioned Saunders, Lord of the Rings; Nick Barstow and Nigel Lilley, Next to Normal; Cat Beveridge and Nigel Lilley, The Witches; Tom Brady, Guys and Dolls; Stephen Brooker, Alfonso Casado Trigo and Stephen Metcalfe, Old Friends |
| Best Choreography | Best Sound Design |
| Matt Cole, Newsies; Fabian Aloise, Sunset Boulevard; Ellen Kane and Hannes Langolf, Dear England; Stephen Mear, La Cage aux Folles; Arlene Phillips with James Cousins, Guys and Dolls; Kenrick "H2O" Sandy, Free Your Mind | Adam Fisher, Sunset Boulevard; Paul Arditti, Guys and Dolls; Paul Arditti, Stranger Things: The First Shadow; Dan Balfour and Tom Gibbons, Dear England; Adam Fisher, Lord of the Rings; Tony Gayle, Next to Normal |
| Best Set Design | Best Costume Design |
| Bunny Christie, Guys and Dolls; Miriam Buether, Stranger Things: The First Shadow; Lizzie Clachan, Assassins; Lizzie Clachan, The Witches; Chloe Lamford, Phaedra; Morgan Large, Newsies | Ryan Dawson Laight, La Cage aux Folles; Bunny Christie and Deborah Andrews, Guys and Dolls; Lizzie Clachan, The Witches; Gregory Gale, To Wong Foo: The Musical; Gareth Pugh, Free Your Mind; Grace Smart, Cowbois |
| Best Lighting Design | Best Casting |
| Jack Knowles, Sunset Boulevard; Rory Beaton and Lucy Carter, The Time Traveller’s Wife; Jon Clark, Dear England; Jon Clark, The Effect; Jon Clark, Stranger Things: The First Shadow; Paule Constable, Guys and Dolls | Jill Green, The Little Big Things; Alastair Coomer and Naomi Downham, The Motive and the Cue; Anna Cooper, Next to Normal; Bryony Jarvis-Taylor, Dear England; Bryony Jarvis-Taylor, The Witches; Jessica Ronane, Stranger Things: The First Shadow |
| Best Video Design | Best Graphic Design |
| Nathan Amzi and Joe Ransom, Sunset Boulevard; 59 Productions, Stranger Things: The First Shadow; Andrzej Goulding, Miss Saigon; Andrzej Goulding, The Time Traveller's Wife; Ash J Woodward, Dear England; Ash J Woodward, The Witches | Muse Creative, Guys and Dolls; Bob King Creative, Operation Mincemeat; Jeremy Coysten and North Design, Free Your Mind; The Creative Partnership, Stranger Things: The First Shadow; Feast Creative, La Cage aux Folles; Rick Guest, Rob Rae and the NT Graphics Studio, Dear England |
| Best Off-West End Production | Best Regional Production |
| Flowers for Mrs Harris; Allegiance; Othello; Rebecca; Scouts! The Musical; The Shape of Things | The Lord of the Rings; Boys from the Blackstuff; Choir Boy; In Dreams; Miss Saigon; To Wong Foo: The Musical |
| Best Concert Event | Best West End Show |
| Love Never Dies; Ariana DeBose in Concert; Darren Criss; Evita in Concert; Once: in Concert; Schwartz at 75 | Cabaret; Back to the Future; Les Misérables; Moulin Rouge! The Musical; The Phantom of the Opera; Six |
Special Award: Services to UK Theatre
Rufus Norris

== Productions with multiple accolades ==
=== Multiple wins ===
- 7 wins: Sunset Boulevard
- 3 wins: Guys and Dolls
- 2 wins: Cabaret, A Little Life

=== Multiple nominations ===
- 12 nominations: Guys and Dolls
- 10 nominations: Dear England
- 9 nominations: Sunset Boulevard
- 8 nominations: Stranger Things: The First Shadow
- 6 nominations: Next to Normal
- 5 nominations: The Effect, The Witches
- 4 nominations: Cabaret, La Cage aux Folles, The Little Big Things, A Little Life, The Lord of the Rings, Newsies, Operation Mincemeat
- 3 nominations: Free Your Mind, Miss Saigon, The Motive and the Cue, A Streetcar Named Desire, The Time Traveller's Wife
- 2 nominations: Assassins, Back to the Future: The Musical, Cowbois, Shirley Valentine, Six, To Wong Foo: The Musical, VANYA, The Wizard of Oz
