= Karczewski =

Karczewski (feminine Karczewska) is a Polish surname. Notable people with the surname include:

- Lucy Karczewski
- Marek Żukow-Karczewski (born 1961), Polish historian
- Nikola Karczewska (born 1999), Polish female footballer
- Stanisław Karczewski (born 1955), Polish politician
- Zdzisław Karczewski (1903–1970), Polish actor
