= Gracie McGonigal =

British stage and screen actress

- Born: Grace Lesley McGonigal; March 2002 (age 24); Ealing, London, England
- Years active: 2021–present

Grace Lesley McGonigal (born March 2002) is a British actress. She is best known for her musical theatre work, and is recognised for bringing disability representation to the London stage.

== Early life ==
McGonigal is from Ealing, West London. McGonigal attended the BRIT School and began her studies at the Mountview Academy of Theatre Arts.

== Career ==
=== Theatre ===
McGonigal made her professional stage debut in the 2021 pantomime Aladdin at the Lyric Theatre, Hammersmith. The following year, she played Susanna Walcott and served as cover Abigail Williams in The Crucible at the National Theatre. The production then transferred to the Gielgud Theatre in 2023, marking McGonigal's West End debut. Also in 2022, McGonigal starred in the titular role of the pantomime Cinderella at the Theatre Royal Stratford East.

In 2023, McGonigal originated the role of Katie in the world premiere West End production of The Little Big Things at @sohoplace. She contributed to the original cast recording. McGonigal also played Ava in Zoe Morris and Meg McGrady's The Phase at the VAULT Festival.

McGonigal returned to the Lyric Hammersmith in 2024 to play Lily in the London production of Fangirls. Later that year, McGonigal appeared as a stand-in for Alexandra Giddens in The Little Foxes at the Young Vic.

In 2025, McGonigal starred as Little Red Riding Hood in the London revival of Into the Woods at the Bridge Theatre.

=== Screen ===
McGonigal made her television debut in the Amazon Prime series The Power.

It was announced in April 2025 McGonigal had joined the cast of the Netflix period drama Bridgerton for its fourth season. In 2026, she appeared in an episode of Father Brown as Lady Martha Silk.

== Public image ==
McGonigal has spoken about the importance of accessible and inclusive casting. In an interview discussing The Little Big Things, she said it was "my dream to do a show with the disabled experience at its heart."

== Personal life ==
McGonigal was born with congenital limb deficiency, meaning her arm did not properly develop below the elbow. In 2020, she received a Hero bionic arm from Open Bionics.

== Accolades ==
In 2024, she won the Watch This Face award at the BOLT Awards.

She performed with the cast of The Little Big Things at the Olivier Awards and at the Royal Variety Performance.

== Acting credits ==
=== Theatre ===
| Year | Title | Role | Theatre | Notes |
|---|---|---|---|---|
| 2021 | Aladdin | Wishy | Lyric Hammersmith | |
| 2022 | The Crucible | Susanna Walcott/Cover Abigail Williams | National Theatre | |
| 2022 | Cinderella | Cinderella | Theatre Royal Stratford East | |
| 2023 | The Crucible | Susanna Walcott/Cover Abigail Williams | Gielgud Theatre | |
| 2023 | The Little Big Things | Katie | @sohoplace | |
| 2023 | The Phase | Ava | VAULT Festival | |
| 2024 | Fangirls | Lily | Lyric Hammersmith | |
| 2024 | The Little Foxes | Alexandra Giddens stand-in | Young Vic | |
| 2025 | Into the Woods | Little Red Ridinghood | Bridge Theatre | |

=== Television ===
| Year | Title | Role | Notes |
|---|---|---|---|
| 2023 | National Theatre Live | Susanna Walcott | Episode: "The Crucible" |
| 2023 | The Power | Farah | Episode: "A New Organ" |
| 2026 | Father Brown | Lady Martha Silk | Episode: "The Bishop's Revenge" |
| 2026 | Bridgerton | Hazel | Series 4 |
