= Cleve September =

Actor

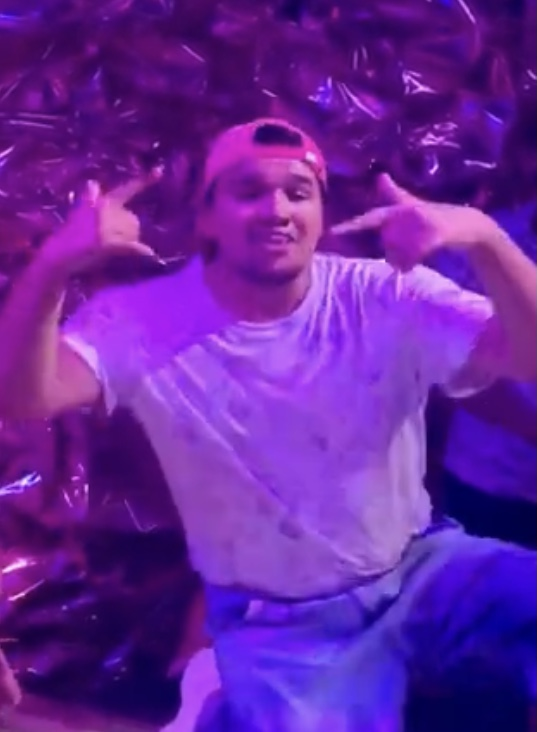
- September performing in Millennials (2022)
- Born: 15 October 1993 (age 32); South Africa
- Education: Mountview Academy of Theatre Arts
- Years active: 2015–present

Cleve September (born 15 October 1993) is a South African-born actor. He originated the role of John Laurens/Philip Hamilton in the West End production of Hamilton. For his performance, he was nominated for Laurence Olivier and WhatsOnStage Awards. He also played Sonny in In the Heights.

== Early life and education ==
September was born in South Africa and moved to London at the age of 8. When he was younger, September was interested in sports, particularly basketball, rugby and sprint.

September attended the BRIT School. He went on to graduate from Mountview Academy of Theatre Arts in 2015 with a Bachelor of Arts in Musical Theatre.

== Career ==
=== Musical theatre ===
September made his professional debut in In the Heights, playing the role of Sonny. The show started its run at the Southwark Playhouse and September joined for its transfer to the Kings Cross Theatre in 2015. Original cast included David Bedella as Kevin Rosario, Eve Polycarpou as Abuela Claudia, Victoria Hamilton-Barritt as Daniela and Sam Mackay as Usnavi.

The cast performed the song "96,000" at the Olivier Awards in 2016, where the show was nominated for Best New Musical.

In 2016 September play the role of Tommy Keeler in the Crucible Theatre production of Annie Get your Gun, with Anna-Jane Casey in the title role.

He was part of the ensemble in the summer production of Jesus Christ Superstar at the Open Air Theatre in 2017. The show opened at the Open Air Theatre in 2016 and returned the following year, after a US tour and a short indoor run at the Barbican Theatre.

In 2018 September joined the cast of the UK premiere of Hamilton in the role of John Laurens/Philip Hamilton. For his performance he was nominated for the Olivier Award for Best Actor in a Supporting Role in a Musical in 2018 and the WhatsOnStage Award for Best Supporting Actor in a Musical in 2019.

September joined the cast of Bonnie & Clyde as Ted Hinton at the Arts Theatre in 2023. The production followed a successful concert run of the show with Jeremy Jordan as Clyde and Frances Mayli McCann as Bonnie in 2022.

In 2023 September will be playing the role of Will in The Little Big Things, playing at Soho Place from September to November. The cast performed a few songs from the show at West End Live in June 2023.

== Theatre credits ==
Year	Title	Role	Theatre
2015–2016	In the Heights	Sonny / us Usnavi	Kings Cross Theatre
2016	Annie Get Your Gun	Tommy Keeler	Crucible Theatre, Sheffield
2017	Jesus Christ Superstar	Ensemble	Regent's Park Open Air Theatre
2017–2019	Hamilton	John Laurens / Philip Hamilton	Victoria Palace
2020	West Side Story	Riff	Royal Exchange Manchester
2020	Dick Whittington	Tom Cat	National Theatre
2022	Millennials	Millennial	The Other Palace
2022–2023	Bonnie & Clyde	Ted Hinton	Arts Theatre and Garrick Theatre
2023	The Little Big Things	Will Fraser	Soho Place
2024	Ushers	Gary	The Other Palace
2024	Cliffs: A New Musical - Workshop	Billy	The Other Palace

== Awards and nominations ==
Year	Work	Award	Category	Result
2016	In the Heights	Olivier Awards	Best New Musical	Nominated
2018	Hamilton	Olivier Awards	Best Actor in a Supporting Role in a Musical	Nominated
2019	Hamilton	WhatsOnStage Awards	Best Supporting Actor in a Musical	Nominated
