= Amy Trigg =

British actress and writer

Amy Trigg (born in 1992) is a British actress and writer. She is best known for the role of Agnes in The Little Big Things, for which she won the Olivier Award as Best Actress in a Supporting Role in a musical in 2024.

== Early life and education ==
Trigg was born with spina bifida and uses a wheelchair. She grew up in Witham, Essex and loved theatre from a very young age.

She trained at Mountview Academy of Theatre Arts, graduating in 2013, and was the first wheelchair user to graduate from a performance course at the academy.

== Acting career ==
Trigg's first role was Laura in The Glass Menagerie at Nottingham Playhouse in 2016. Trigg was cast as Sally in a UK tour of The Who's Tommy in 2017, part of a project called Ramps on the Moon, funded by the Arts Council and aimed at highlighting disabled artists and performers.

She was part of the 2019 Royal Shakespeare Company season in the roles of Juliet in Measure for Measure and Biondella in The Taming of the Shrew. In an interview with the RSC she highlighted the importance of representation for audiences, as "it's still uncommon to have wheelchair-using actors onstage". During her time with the RSC she also wrote a regular blog as part of the Whispers from the Wings series, where she shares her experience, as well as chat with fellow cast members.

In July 2023 full cast for the musical The Little Big Things was announced, with Trigg joining in the role of Agnes. The show is based on the best-selling memoir of Henry Fraser of the same name. Trigg won the Olivier Award for Best Actress in a Supporting Role in a Musical for this role in 2024, becoming the first disabled actor to win in this category (and only second to win an Olivier Award). The musical was added to the streaming platform "National Theatre at home" in April 2024, after its extended run and closure in March of the same year.

=== Theatre ===
Year	Title	Role	Theatre
2016	The Glass Menagerie	Laura	Nottingham Playhouse
2017	The Who's Tommy	Sally Simpson	UK Tour
2016	Goth Weekend	Anna	Stephen Joseph Theatre and Live Theatre
2019	Measure for Measure	Juliet	RSC
2019	The Taming of the Shrew	Biondella	RSC
2020–2022	Reasons You Should(n't) Love Me	Juno	Paines Plough tour, and Kiln Theatre
2023	Medea	Third Woman of Corinth	@sohoplace
2023–2024	The Little Big Things	Agnes	@sohoplace

=== Filmography ===
Year	Title	Role	Notes
2018	Mamma Mia: Here We Go Again	performer	
2019	RSC Measure for Measure	Juliet	
2020	Unprecedented	Eloise	TV series (1 episode)
2020	The Banishing	Agnes Peerless	
2021	Feel Good	Fan	TV series (1 episode)
2022	Casualty	Louise Fletcher	TV series (1 episode)
2022	The Other One	Pension Office Woman	TV series (2 episodes)
2023	Luther: The Fallen Sun	Bullpen Tech	Netflix movie
2023	Unforgotten	Sheila Hussay Brenton	TV series (1 episode)
2023	Everything Now	Miss Lambert	TV series (4 episodes)
2023	The Reckoning	Libby	TV series (1 episode)
2023	Such Brave Girls	Claire	TV series (2 episodes)
2024	Father Brown	Shirley Warner	TV series (1 episode)

== Writing career ==
Trigg started focusing on writing after graduating because of a lack of jobs and accessibility for wheelchair users in theatre, as well as performing comedy shows. She was then approached by writer Scarlett Curtis to contribute to the book Feminists Don't Wear Pink (and Other Lies), to which big names also contributed, such as Keira Knightley and Gemma Arterton.

In 2020 Trigg was the joint recipient of the first Women's Prize for Playwriting for her full-length play Reasons You Should(n't) Love Me. Her play centres on a disabled young woman, Juno, and is meant to be performed by an actor using a wheelchair. The show premiered – with Trigg in the role of Juno – at the Kiln Theatre in 2021, returning to the venue in 2022 alongside a nationwide tour.

Trigg is one of the writers for the British TV series Ralph & Katie (a spin off of the BBC1/ITV Studios show The A Word).

She has been part of various writing programmes from the BBC TV Drama Writers' Programme (2021), 4Screenwriting (2021), BBC Drama Room (2020/21), BBC Writers' Access Group (2020/21), the Royal Court Introduction to Playwriting Group (2020/21) and BBC Children's New Voices (2020).

== Personal life ==
Trigg got engaged to actor Jordan Benjamin in Frinton-on-Sea in 2024. The two met rehearsing for the musical The Little Big Things.. They married on 20th September 2025.

== Awards and nominations ==
Year	Work	Award	Category	Result
2016	The Rebrand	Colchester New Comedian of the Year		Won
2020	Reasons You Should(n't) Love Me	Women's Prize for Playwriting	n/a	Won
2024	The Little Big Things	WhatsOnStage Awards	Best Supporting Performer in a Musical	Nominated
2024	The Little Big Things	Olivier Awards	Best Actress in a Supporting Role in a Musical	Won
