= Joe White (writer) =

English playwright, librettist and audio dramatist

- Education: University of Birmingham
- Years active: 2014–present
- Website: joewhitewriter.com

Joe White is an English playwright, librettist and audio dramatist. His plays include Mayfly (2018) and Blackout Songs (2022). He wrote the book for the musical The Little Big Things (2023). His theatre work has received a number of accolades, including Laurence Olivier Award nominations.

White has also worked in audio drama, including The Nox (2022) and an adaptation of George Orwell's 1984 (2024), which was nominated for an ARIA Award and won an Audie Award respectively.

== Early life ==
White graduated with a Bachelor of Arts (BA) in Drama and Theatre Arts in 2010 and a Master of Arts (MA) in Playwriting Studies, both from the University of Birmingham.

== Career ==
In partnership with Birmingham Repertory Theatre, White was selected for the 2014 BBC Writersroom 10. He was next the 2015 Pentabus Writer in Residence. In 2016, he was selected for the Old Vic 12.

White's debut play Mayfly premiered at the Orange Tree Theatre in 2018. Lyn Gardner of The Guardian described the play as a "tender debut", while Dominic Cavendish of The Daily Telegraph characterised the play as a "warm, wise, sad debut". For Mayfly White received the 2019 Offie for Most Promising New Playwright and a nomination for Best Writer at The Stage Debut Awards.

White's play Blackout Songs premiered at the Hampstead Theatre in 2022. The Guardian's Arifa Akbar described the play as a "drunk and disorderly exploration of love and addiction", highlighting White's focus on relationships and substance dependency. The production was nominated for the Laurence Olivier Award for Outstanding Achievement in an Affiliate Theatre. In 2026, Blackout Songs had its Off Broadway premiere in New York at the MCC Theater.

White wrote the book for the musical The Little Big Things, which premiered in the West End in 2023. The production was nominated for the Laurence Olivier Award for Best New Musical.

In audio drama, White wrote The Nox (2022), which was nominated for the ARIA Award for Best Drama. In 2024, White wrote a seven-part dramatisation of George Orwell's 1984 for Audible starring Andrew Garfield, Cynthia Erivo and Andrew Scott. 1984 won the Audie Award for Audio Drama.

== Select bibliography ==
=== Plays ===
- Mayfly (2018)
- Ursa Major (2021)
- Blackout Songs (2022)

=== Musicals ===
- The Little Big Things (2023)

=== Audio ===
- Doggerland (2019)
- The Nox (2022)
- 1984 (2024)

== Awards and nominations ==
- 2018: The Stage Debut Award nomination, Best Writer for Mayfly (2018)
- 2019: Offie for Most Promising New Playwright for Mayfly
- 2021: JB Priestley Award for Writers of Promise
- 2023: Laurence Olivier Award nomination, Outstanding Achievement in Affiliate Theatre for Blackout Songs
- 2023: ARIA Award nomination, Best Drama
- 2024: Laurence Olivier Award nomination, Best New Musical for The Little Big Things
- 2025: Audie Award, Audio Drama for 1984 (2025)
