= Julianne Pundan =

Filipino actress

- Education: The BRIT School; Sylvia Young Theatre School
- Occupation: Actress
- Years active: 2025-present

Julianne Pundan is a Filipino actress. For her performance as Kim in a UK tour of Miss Saigon she won for Best Performer in a Musical at The Stage Debut Awards in 2026, and won for Best Performance in a Musical at the 2026 UK Theatre Awards.

== Career ==
Pundan was inspired to pursues a career in musical theatre having watched a documentary about Lea Salonga.

Pundan trained at The BRIT School and Sylvia Young Theatre School. Her theatre credits while training included being part of the Ensemble in Fangirls at the Lyric Hammersmith and as a soloist in A Brighter Sound at the Royal Albert Hall.

She made her professional debut in November 2025 as Kim in a touring production of Miss Saigon, produced by Michael Harrison in association with Cameron Mackintosh, and directed by Jean-Pierre van der Spuy. She won for Best Performer in a Musical at The Stage Debut Awards in September 2026. The following month, she won for Best Performance in a Musical at the 2026 UK Theatre Awards.

== Personal life ==
She is Filipino.
