= Stereophonic (play) =

Stage play written by David Adjmi

- Broadway promotional poster
- Original language: English
- Written by: David Adjmi
- Music by: Will Butler
- Lyrics by: Will Butler
- Subject: A rock band attempting to record a monumental album amidst increased tensions over a year
- Setting: California, 1976-77

Premiere
- Date: October 29, 2023
- Place: Playwrights Horizons, New York City
- Directed by: Daniel Aukin
- Official website

Stereophonic is a dramatic stage play with music, written by American playwright David Adjmi. Music written for the play was composed by Will Butler from the indie rock band Arcade Fire. The 4-act play follows a fictional rock band on the cusp of superstardom as they struggle through recording their new album set from 1976 to 1977.

The show received enormous critical acclaim, with critics noting similarities to the real-life band Fleetwood Mac and the creation of their 1977 album Rumours.

The original Broadway production made history when it garnered 13 nominations at the 77th Tony Awards, breaking the record previously held by Slave Play (2020) to receive the most nominations for a play in the history of the ceremony; The play proceeded to win five awards: Best Play (which it also won at the Drama Desk Award, the Drama League Award, the Outer Critics Circle Award, and the New York Drama Critics' Circle Award), Best Direction of a Play, Best Featured Actor in a Play (for Will Brill; Eli Gelb and Tom Pecinka also received nominations for the award), Best Scenic Design of a Play and Best Sound Design of a Play. Juliana Canfield and Sarah Pidgeon both received nominations for Best Featured Actress in a Play.

The production debuted at Playwrights Horizons off-Broadway in 2023 before transferring to Broadway at the John Golden Theatre in 2024 and subsequently to the West End's Duke of York’s Theatre in 2025, with the latter two runs receiving two extensions and the London run earning the joint-most nominations for a new play at the 2026 Laurence Olivier Awards.

== Synopsis ==
In 1976, a famous British-American rock band composed of drummer Simon, married couple bassist Reg and keyboardist/vocalist Holly, and longtime partners guitarist/vocalist Peter and vocalist/tambourinist Diana are in the early stages of recording their next album in a recording studio in Sausalito, California. They are assisted by two sound engineers, Grover and Charlie. Despite the significant - and scarcely precedented - studio support, the members' individual conflicts coupled with mounting tensions among the group, and eventually the engineers, causes the recording process to take around a year.

== Plot ==
=== Act I: July 1976, Sausalito, CA ===
An unnamed British-American rock band gathers at a recording studio in Sausalito to record their second album, assisted by sound engineers Grover and Charlie. Drummer Simon, whose wife and children still live in England, attempts to keep the peace as the marriage between bassist Reg and keyboardist/vocalist Holly crumbles, largely due to Reg's drug and alcohol addiction. The band begins rehearsing new songs; guitarist/vocalist Peter, who is also producing the album, makes frequent changes and vocalist/tambourinist Diana, Peter's girlfriend, struggles with self-confidence while performing. Grover confesses to Charlie that he lied about working with the Eagles in order to get the engineering job. Simon reveals that one of Diana's songs from their debut album has entered the Billboard Top Ten, with the album re-entering the Top Forty, and that Columbia has tripled their budget for the second album. Diana performs the beginnings of her new song, "Bright." Reg laments the state of his marriage and discusses his recent fascination with the Sausalito Houseboat Wars with Simon and Peter. Though Peter attempts to bond with Simon and Reg, his hypercritical nature prevents them from connecting.

Holly tells Diana that she has bought a condo and is moving out of the band's shared home. Reg is upset, but Holly refuses to be responsible for his addiction any longer and chides Simon for enabling Reg. The band argues while recording Holly's song "Drive," with Holly scolding Grover for his apathy toward the creative process.

=== Act II: September 1976 ===
While recording "Seven Roads," Simon is frustrated by a ringing in the snare drums and becomes obsessive about fixing them, to the band and engineers' chagrin. Reg is now sober and taking better care of himself, healing tensions between him and Holly. Diana and Holly discuss the strangeness of the band's new fame, with Diana worrying about her lack of expertise with musical instruments and Holly musing on the compromises necessary within romantic relationships.

The band records different arrangements of "Bright," though Peter publicly pressures Diana to remove verses. The two fight about Peter's critical nature and Diana's need for encouragement, eventually bringing up past arguments, Peter's fraught relationship with his father, and Diana's reluctance to have a child.

Grover frequently corrects issues while recording "Masquerade," and convinces a reluctant Simon to use a click track to stay on tempo. The song's 37th take is perfect, and the band and engineers celebrate.

=== Act III ===
Late December 1976

Diana struggles to hit a climactic high note while recording "East of Eden." Peter coldly criticizes her for her inability to do so, berating her further for growing flustered. Diana insists on speaking with Peter privately, with Grover and Charlie listening in on their fight until Diana ends their relationship. A heartbroken Diana returns to the booth and is able to hit the note.

March 1977

Grover, distraught, reveals to Charlie that Holly and Reg have broken up as well, and laments the all-consuming task that recording the album has become. Simon tells Holly that his wife is leaving him. After Grover records over a take at Peter's request, Peter verbally and physically assaults him until Simon intervenes.

Peter later apologizes, but Grover has grown disillusioned with managing the band members' egos. Reg discusses the group's upcoming move to a recording studio in Los Angeles and his new relationship; Holly overhears and the two argue about rejection. Afterward, Holly and Grover discuss the love scenes in Don't Look Now and Last Tango in Paris, particularly the former film's expression of grief.

=== Act IV: First week of June 1977, Los Angeles, CA ===
Diana, Peter, and Holly record backing vocals for "Drive" at four in the morning, with Diana and Peter viciously arguing with and insulting each other throughout. Later that day, ahead of a band meeting, Reg gets upset after Peter re-records his bass lines; Simon confronts Peter about his controlling nature and gradual alienation of his bandmates. Rattled, Peter begs Diana for reconciliation, which she rebuffs. Reg congratulates Grover on being promoted to a producer on the album, which Grover responds to cynically, unwilling to find joy in such a painful process. Reg admits that while he has relapsed with alcohol, he still ultimately views life as good and worthwhile. The band and the engineers gather to discuss how to trim the runtime of the record; Diana refuses to remove verses from her songs, preferring to cut "Bright" entirely. Diana confesses to Holly that Columbia is giving her a solo album, which Holly reacts to with ambivalence. Grover consoles Diana, but while he views the recording process as "a nightmare," Diana tells him that recording the album, despite its emotional toll, was "the best thing that's ever happened to [her]". She also reveals that the entire band knew Grover had lied about his prior engineering experience, but Peter had pushed to hire him anyway. Grover stays in the studio alone, editing "Drive" at the mixing console.

== Background ==
Adjmi and Butler began working on the piece in 2014, with the project being workshopped in 2018 at the Sundance Institute Theatre Lab. Adjmi wanted to create a piece of theatre that felt like the audience was watching a documentary unfolding on stage, while avoiding the piece becoming a full-blown musical. The set design includes real music recording equipment. As cast member Eli Gelb said, "It’s all recorded live. The entire band, every instrument, every audio signal ... every night. Every audio signal that you hear is routed to a mixer."

== Production history ==
=== Off-Broadway (2023) ===
The play premiered Off-Broadway at Playwrights Horizons on October 7, 2023, with an official opening of October 26, directed by Daniel Aukin. It was named Best Play of the Year by the Washington Post, and "hands-down the best American play since the pandemic" by former New York Times critic Ben Brantley. Stereophonic was named Best of 2023 by numerous publications, including the New Yorker, New York Magazine, The New York Times, The Wrap, and Time Out New York. After multiple extensions, the play closed on December 17, 2023.

=== Broadway (2024–2025) ===
In January 2024, it was announced the play would transfer to Broadway in early 2024 for a limited engagement. The show began previews on April 2, 2024, and officially opened on Broadway on April 19 at the John Golden Theatre. The production was scheduled to run until July 7, 2024 before being extended multiple times due to popular demand. The production received acclaim from critics, earning 5 wins and 13 nominations at the 77th Tony Awards. The show won Best Play, Best Performance by a Featured Actor in a Play (Will Brill), Best Direction of a Play (Daniel Aukin), Best Scenic Design of a Play (David Zinn), and Best Sound Design of a Play (Ryan Rumery). It tied with the jukebox musical Hell's Kitchen as the two most nominated shows at the ceremony. Stereophonic now holds the record for the most Tony nominations by a play, surpassing the record previously held by Slave Play. Sarah Pidgeon, Juliana Canfield, and Tom Pecinka departed the production on September 29 with Amy Forsyth, Rebecca Naomi Jones, and Benjamin Anthony Anderson replacing their respective roles as Diana, Holly, and Peter respectively.

The production closed on January 12, 2025.

=== West End (2025) ===
In January 2025, it was announced that the show would transfer to the West End at the Duke of York’s Theatre, with performances scheduled to begin in May 2025. Eli Gelb, Andrew R. Butler, and Chris Stack are set to reprise their roles from the previous two productions. Joining the cast were Zachary Hart, Lucy Karczewski, Jack Riddiford and Nia Towle.

=== US Tour (2025–2026) ===
A US tour is scheduled to begin in October 2025 at the Paramount Theatre in Seattle. It will also visit the Pantages Theatre in Los Angeles from December 9, 2025 to January 2, 2026, and the CIBC Theatre in Chicago from January 27 to February 8, 2026. Performances in other US cities are scheduled through May 2026.

== Original cast and characters ==
Character	Off-Broadway	Broadway	West End	U.S. Tour
Character	2023	2024	2025	2025
Reg	Will Brill	Will Brill	Zachary Hart	Christopher Mowod
Diana	Sarah Pidgeon	Sarah Pidgeon	Lucy Karczewski	Claire DeJean
Peter	Tom Pecinka	Tom Pecinka	Jack Riddiford	Denver Milord
Holly	Juliana Canfield	Juliana Canfield	Nia Towle	Emilie Kouatchou
Simon	Chris Stack	Chris Stack	Chris Stack	Cornelius McMoyler
Charlie	Andrew R. Butler	Andrew R. Butler	Andrew R. Butler	Steven Lee Johnson
Grover	Eli Gelb	Eli Gelb	Eli Gelb	Jack Barrett

=== Notable replacements ===
==== Broadway (2024–2025) ====
- Diana: Amy Forsyth
- Holly: Rebecca Naomi Jones

== Musical numbers ==
Although the play is not a musical, several 1970s inspired original songs are played live in the set's "studio" as the play depicts the recording of the album. In all productions of the show so far, the actors themselves supply all the vocals and play all the music, though many in the cast had to learn to play their instrument for this production. Original Broadway cast member Will Brill had never even held a bass before being cast as the band's bassist.

An original cast recording of the music from Stereophonic was released digitally on May 10, 2024, and became available on CD on June 14, 2024.

Track listing

- "Seven Roads"
- "Bright v1"
- "Masquerade"
- "Bright (Fast)"
- "Drive"
- "Champagne"
- "East of Eden"
- "Domino"
- "'It's made of teak'"
- "In Your Arms"
- "BVs"
- "Exorcist II"
- "Campfire Masquerade"
- "Bright (Take 22)"

== Copyright lawsuit ==
In October 2024, a lawsuit was filed, alleging that Stereophonic infringes on the memoir Making Rumours by Ken Caillat and Steven Stiefel. In December 2024, the lawsuit was settled out of court.

== Awards and nominations ==
=== 2023 Off-Broadway production ===
Year	Award	Category	Nominee	Result	Ref.
2024	Drama Desk Awards	Outstanding Play	David Adjmi	Won	
2024	Drama Desk Awards	Outstanding Director of a Play	Daniel Aukin	Won	
2024	Drama Desk Awards	Outstanding Music in a Play	Will Butler	Won	
2024	Drama Desk Awards	Outstanding Orchestrations	Will Butler and Justin Craig	Nominated	
2024	Drama Desk Awards	Outstanding Scenic Design of a Play	David Zinn	Won	
2024	Drama Desk Awards	Outstanding Costume Design of a Play	Enver Chakartash	Won	
2024	Drama Desk Awards	Outstanding Sound Design of a Play	Ryan Rumery	Won	
2024	Drama Desk Awards	Outstanding Wig and Hair	Robert Pickens and Katie Gell	Nominated	
2024	Drama Desk Awards	Special Ensemble Award	Will Brill, Andrew R. Butler, Juliana Canfield, Eli Gelb, Tom Pecinka, Sarah Pidgeon, and Chris Stack	Won	
2024	Lucille Lortel Awards	Outstanding Play	David Adjmi	Nominated	
2024	Lucille Lortel Awards	Outstanding Director	Daniel Aukin	Nominated	
2024	Lucille Lortel Awards	Outstanding Featured Performer in a Play	Eli Gelb	Won	
2024	Lucille Lortel Awards	Outstanding Scenic Design	David Zinn	Nominated	
2024	Lucille Lortel Awards	Outstanding Costume Design	Enver Chakartash	Nominated	
2024	Lucille Lortel Awards	Outstanding Lighting Design	Jiyoun Chang	Nominated	
2024	Lucille Lortel Awards	Outstanding Sound Design	Ryan Rumery	Won	

=== 2024 Broadway production ===
Year	Award	Category	Nominee	Result	Ref.
2024	Tony Awards	Best Play		Won	
2024	Tony Awards	Best Featured Actor in a Play	Will Brill	Won	
2024	Tony Awards	Best Featured Actor in a Play	Eli Gelb	Nominated	
2024	Tony Awards	Best Featured Actor in a Play	Tom Pecinka	Nominated	
2024	Tony Awards	Best Featured Actress in a Play	Sarah Pidgeon	Nominated	
2024	Tony Awards	Best Featured Actress in a Play	Juliana Canfield	Nominated	
2024	Tony Awards	Best Direction of a Play	Daniel Aukin	Won	
2024	Tony Awards	Best Original Score	Will Butler	Nominated	
2024	Tony Awards	Best Orchestrations	Will Butler and Justin Craig	Nominated	
2024	Tony Awards	Best Scenic Design	David Zinn	Won	
2024	Tony Awards	Best Costume Design	Enver Chakartash	Nominated	
2024	Tony Awards	Best Lighting Design	Jiyoun Chang	Nominated	
2024	Tony Awards	Best Sound Design	Ryan Rumery	Won	
2024	Drama League Awards	Outstanding Production of a Play	David Adjmi	Won	
2024	Drama League Awards	Outstanding Direction of a Play	Daniel Aukin	Won	
2024	Drama League Awards	Distinguished Performance	Eli Gelb	Nominated	
2024	Drama League Awards	Distinguished Performance	Sarah Pidgeon	Nominated	
2024	Outer Critics Circle Awards	Outstanding New Broadway Play	David Adjmi	Won	
2024	Outer Critics Circle Awards	Outstanding Featured Performer in a Broadway Play	Sarah Pidgeon	Nominated	
2024	Outer Critics Circle Awards	Outstanding Score (Broadway or Off-Broadway)	Will Butler	Nominated	
2024	Outer Critics Circle Awards	Outstanding Direction of a Play (Broadway of Off-Broadway)	Daniel Aukin	Won	
2024	Outer Critics Circle Awards	Outstanding Scenic Design (Broadway or Off-Broadway)	David Zinn	Won	
2024	Outer Critics Circle Awards	Outstanding Costume Design	Enver Chakartash	Nominated	
2024	Outer Critics Circle Awards	Outstanding Sound Design	Ryan Rumery	Won	
2024	New York Drama Critics' Circle Awards	Best Play	David Adjmi	Won	
2024	Theatre World Award		Sarah Pidgeon	Won	
2024	Theatre World Award		Tom Pecinka	Won	
2024	Theatre World Award		Chris Stack	Won	
2024	Dorian Award	Outstanding Broadway Play		Won	
2024	Dorian Award	Outstanding Featured Performance in a Broadway Play	Will Brill	Nominated	
2024	Dorian Award	Outstanding Featured Performance in a Broadway Play	Eli Gelb	Nominated	
2024	Dorian Award	Outstanding Featured Performance in a Broadway Play	Tom Pecinka	Nominated	
2024	Dorian Award	Outstanding Featured Performance in a Broadway Play	Sarah Pidgeon	Won	
2024	Dorian Award	Outstanding Broadway Ensemble	Company	Won	

=== 2025 West End production ===
Year	Award	Category	Nominee	Result
2026	Lawrence Olivier Awards	Best Actress in a Supporting Role	Lucy Karczewski	Nominated
2026	Lawrence Olivier Awards	Best Actor in a Supporting Role	Zachary Hart	Nominated
2026	Lawrence Olivier Awards	Best Costume Design	Enver Chakartash	Nominated
2026	Lawrence Olivier Awards	Best Set Design	David Zinn	Nominated
2026	Lawrence Olivier Awards	Best Sound Design	Ryan Rumery	Nominated
2026	Lawrence Olivier Awards	Outstanding Musical Contribution	Will Butler (Original Songs & Orchestrations) & Justin Craig (Orchestrations)	Nominated
