= Rebecca Frecknall =

British theatre director

- Born: 1986 (age 39–40)
- Education: London Academy of Music and Dramatic Art
- Occupation: Theatre director
- Years active: 2016–present
- Notable work: Cabaret, Summer and Smoke

Rebecca Frecknall is a British theatre director best known for directing the 2021 West End revival of Cabaret starring Eddie Redmayne and Jessie Buckley. The show received the 2022 Olivier Award for Best Revival of a Musical, and Frecknall was named Best Director, taking home both the Olivier Award and Critics' Circle Award. She is also associate director at the Almeida Theatre where she directed Summer & Smoke, Three Sisters, The Duchess of Malfi, A Streetcar Named Desire and Romeo and Juliet. Her direction of Summer & Smoke first brought her critical acclaim and showcased her ability to re-invent old works in new ways. The production won the Laurence Olivier Award for Best Revival of a Play in 2019, with Frecknall also nominated for the Sir Peter Hall Award for Best Director. In 2023 she was listed by The Stage as the 13th most influential person in the theatre.

== Career ==
In 2018, Frecknall directed a revival of the Tennessee Williams play Summer and Smoke at the Almeida Theatre, her first in a major London theatre. The revival received rave reviews and secured a transfer to the West End, at the Duke of York's Theatre. Holly Williams, writing for The Independent, remarked that the staging "announces Frecknall as a director of real vision". Veteran critic Michael Billington wrote in The Guardian that Frecknall's production "restores Williams’s wrongly neglected play to a central place in the canon." Susannah Clapp at The Observer, asserted, "Summer and Smoke must make Rebecca Frecknall’s name as a director." The production received 5 nominations at the 2019 Laurence Olivier Awards and was awarded Best Revival and Best Actress for Patsy Ferran.

In 2019, she directed revivals of The Duchess of Malfi and Three Sisters, both at the Almeida Theatre.

In 2019, Eddie Redmayne saw Frecknall's production of Summer and Smoke on the final night of its West End run at the Duke of York's, and was inspired to ask her to consider directing a revival of Cabaret that he was attached to, in the role of the Emcee. The production, titled Cabaret at the Kit Kat Club, converted the Playhouse Theatre from a proscenium-arch theatre into an in-the-round cabaret space, with prologue performers putting on routines on all levels of the theatre before the start of the show. It opened in 2021 to rapturous reviews, and was described in the New York Times as "a nerve-shredding revival". Dominic Cavendish at The Telegraph called it "the kill-for-a-ticket theatrical triumph of 2021". Renowned critic John Lahr, writing for Air Mail, stated that Frecknall was "the complete dazzling directorial package: a fine critical mind wedded to a confident sense of fun", and "succeeded in making John Kander and Fred Ebb’s 56-year-old fun machine feel like a brand-new musical event". The revival received 11 nominations, and led with seven wins at the 2022 Olivier Awards, including Best Musical Revival and Best Director for Frecknall, setting a record for being the most award-winning revival in Olivier history, as well for being the first production to obtain awards in all 4 eligible acting categories, with awards for Redmayne, Jessie Buckley, Liza Sadovy and Elliot Levey. The production has enjoyed widespread audience acclaim, and is slated to continue at the converted Playhouse Theatre till September 2024.

In 2023, she directed a revival of A Streetcar Named Desire, starring Patsy Ferran, Paul Mescal and Anjana Vasan, which opened at the Almeida and then transferred to the West End, at the Phoenix Theatre. The revival was met with rave reviews, and received 6 nominations at the 2023 Laurence Olivier Awards, winning 3, including Best Revival, Best Actor for Mescal and Best Supporting Actress for Vasan. David Benedict, writing for Variety, stated that Frecknall "proves once again that she is a theatrical force to be reckoned with."

Her 2023 production of Romeo and Juliet, at the Almeida Theatre, starring Toheeb Jimoh and Isis Hainsworth, was met with glowing reviews. Arifa Akbar at the Guardian remarked that Frecknall "is fast becoming the director with a consummate gift for turning old into new", a sentiment echoed in the New York Times by Matt Wolf, who wrote that Frecknall "treats the often overly familiar play as if it were entirely fresh, and the result is astonishing."

In 2024 Frecknall made her Dutch debut at Internationaal Theater Amsterdam with Julie, an adaptation of August Strindberg's Fröken Julie, receiving good reviews. In 2026 her adaptation of Henrik Ibsen's Bygmester Solness, The Architect, will premier at International Theater Amsterdam.

== Background ==
Frecknall grew up in Cambridgeshire, the middle of three sisters. She read Drama and Theatre Arts at Goldsmiths, University of London, before participating in the director's course at LAMDA. Her love of theatre was inspired by her late father, to whom she dedicated her 2022 Laurence Olivier Award.

== Directing credits ==
Year	Title	Venue
TBA	Death of a Salesman	National Theatre, Lyttelton
2026	Cleansed	Almeida Theatre
2026	The Master Builder	Internationaal Theater Amsterdam
2026	A Streetcar Named Desire	Internationaal Theater Amsterdam
2025	A Moon for the Misbegotten	Almeida Theatre
2025	A Streetcar Named Desire	Noël Coward Theatre (later, Brooklyn Academy of Music)
2024	Cat on a Hot Tin Roof	Almeida Theatre
2024	Cabaret	The Kit Kat Club (August Wilson Theatre)
2024	Julie	Internationaal Theater Amsterdam
2023	The House of Bernarda Alba	National Theatre, Lyttelton
2023	Romeo and Juliet	Almeida Theatre
2023	A Streetcar Named Desire	Almeida Theatre (later, Phoenix Theatre, London)
2021	Cabaret	The Kit Kat Club (Playhouse Theatre)
2020	Sanctuary City	New York Theatre Workshop
2019	The Duchess of Malfi	Almeida Theatre
2019	Three Sisters	Almeida Theatre
2018	Steel	Sheffield Theatres, Studio
2018	Summer and Smoke	Almeida Theatre (later, Duke of York's Theatre)

== Awards and nominations ==
Year	Award	Category	Nominee	Result
2024	WhatsOnStage Awards	Best Director	A Streetcar Named Desire	Nominated
2023	Evening Standard Theatre Awards	Best Director	A Streetcar Named Desire	Nominated
2023	Laurence Olivier Awards	Best Director	A Streetcar Named Desire	Nominated
2022	Laurence Olivier Awards	Best Director	Cabaret	Won
2022	Critics' Circle Theatre Award	Best Director	Cabaret	Won
2022	WhatsOnStage Awards	Best Director	Cabaret	Nominated
2022	Drama Desk Awards	Best Director	Sanctuary City	Won
2019	Laurence Olivier Awards	Best Director	Summer and Smoke	Nominated
