= Lucy Karczewski =

British actress (born 1999/2000)

- Born: Lucy Marie Karczewski; 1999 (age 26–27)
- Education: London Academy of Music and Dramatic Art
- Years active: 2023–present

Lucy Marie Karczewski (born 1999/2000) is an English actress. For her performance in the play Stereophonic (2025), she earned a Stage Debut Award and a Laurence Olivier Award nomination.

== Early life ==
Karczewski grew up in Ramsgate, Kent with her twin sister and three older sisters. Karczewski attended Chatham and Clarendon Grammar School, completing her A Levels in 2018. Via the Open Door scheme, she went on to graduate with a Bachelor of Arts (BA) in Acting from the London Academy of Music and Dramatic Art (LAMDA) in 2023.

== Career ==
In 2025, Karczewski made her professional stage debut when she covered for Tanya Reynolds and Emma Corrin in the Barbican Theatre production of The Seagull and her West End debut starring as Diana in the London run of the play Stereophonic at the Duke of York's Theatre. For her performance in the latter, Karczewski won Best Performer in a Play at The Stage Debut Awards and was nominated for the Laurence Olivier Award for Best Actress in a Supporting Role and Emerging Talent at the London Standard Theatre Awards.. Karczewski is currently starring in Hayfever at Wyndham’s theatre on the westend.

Karczewski is set to make her television debut in the Peaky Blinders sequel series.
