= Cowbois (play) =

2023 play

- Original language: English
- Written by: Charlie Josephine
- Genre: Western

Premiere
- Date: 14 October 2023
- Place: Swan Theatre, Stratford-upon-Avon

Cowbois is a play by Charlie Josephine.

== Production history ==
The play was first presented by the Royal Shakespeare Company and made its world premiere at the Swan Theatre, Stratford-upon-Avon beginning previews on 14 October 2023 (with a press night on 24 October 2023) running until 18 November 2023. The play is co-directed by Charlie Josephine and Sean Holmes. Following the success of the play, it was announced that it will transfer to the Royal Court Theatre, London from 11 January running until 10 February 2024.

== Critical reception ==
The Observer's Clare Brennan gave the play 3 out of 5 stars, writing that it was "atmospheric but slow-going". The Guardian's Ryan Gilbey gave the play 4 out of 5 stars, praising the cast and the staging. The Daily Telegraph's Holly Williams gave the play 4 out of 5 stars, writing that "Cowbois is at its best when it's unabashedly cheesy". Williams also praised the cast, particularly Lucy McCormick and LJ Parkinson.
