= The Little Big Things (musical) =

2023 musical

- A New Musical
- West End Promotional Poster
- Music: Nick Butcher
- Lyrics: Nick Butcher; Tom Ling
- Book: Joe White
- Basis: The Little Big Things by Henry Fraser
- Premiere: 2 September 2023: @sohoplace, London
- Productions: 2023 West End; 2026 Amsterdam

The Little Big Things is a musical with music by Nick Butcher, lyrics by Nick Butcher and Tom Ling and a book by Joe White, based on the Sunday Times best selling memoir of the same name by Henry Fraser. The show received three Laurence Olivier Award nominations, including Best New Musical and won Best Actress in a Supporting Role in a Musical for Amy Trigg.

== Production history ==
=== West End (2023) ===
The musical made its world premiere at @sohoplace in London's West End beginning previews on 2 September 2023. Originally scheduled to run until 25 November 2023, it was announced that the production would be extending to 2 March 2024. The production was directed by Luke Sheppard. Full casting was announced on 7 July 2023.

=== Amsterdam (2026) ===
In March 2026, it was announced that The Little Big Things would run at the Royal Theatre Carré as part of Broadway in Carré in Amsterdam in Summer 2026. The Dutch production is directed by Ola Mafaalani and produced by Madeleine van der Zwaan. Ed Larkin reprises his role from the West End production.

== Cast and characters ==
Character	West End	Amsterdam
Character	2023	2026
Henry Fraser (Man)	Ed Larkin	Ed Larkin
Henry Fraser (Boy)	Jonny Amies	Djavan van de Fliert
Fran Fraser	Linzi Hateley	Joy Wielkens
Andrew Fraser	Alasdair Harvey	Edwin Jonker Liam Tobin
Tom Fraser	Jamie Chatterton	Winny Herbert
Will Fraser	Cleve September	Jurriaan Bruinier
Dom Fraser	Jordan Benjamin	Francisco Schuster
Agnes	Amy Trigg	Tessa Jonge Poerink
Dr. Graham	Malinda Parris	Sarah-Jane Wijdenbosch
Katie	Gracie McGonigal	Lucia Zemene
Surgeon	Rebecca Bowden	
Marco	Tom Oliver	Tom Nye

== Musical numbers ==
Act I

- "Prologue" - Man Henry Fraser and Boy Henry Fraser
- "Never Coming Home" - Company
- "Feel Like This" - Boy Henry Fraser and Company
- "One to Seventeen" - Fran Fraser
- "Work of Heart" - Dr Graham and Company
- "Part of the Plan" - Agnes and Fran Fraser
- "Uma Vida" - Company
- "Why?" - Man Henry Fraser
- "Don't Wanna Have To" - Tom Fraser, Will Fraser, Dom Fraser, Fran Fraser, Andrew Fraser
- "The World Is Waiting" - Company

Act 2

- "Entr'acte" - Band
- "What I Need" - Tom Fraser, Will Fraser, Dom Fraser and Company
- "Silence of the Sea" - Boy Henry
- "Things We Shouldn't Do" - Agnes Fraser and Company
- "Sympathy" - Tom Fraser, Will Fraser, Dom Fraser
- "Miles and Miles" - Andrew Fraser and Company
- "Guide You" - Man Henry Fraser, Boy Henry Fraser and Company
- "One to Seventeen (Reprise)" - Andrew Fraser
- "The Little Big Things" - Man Henry Fraser and Company
- "Playout" - Band

== Critical reception ==
The show had its official opening night on 14 September 2023, with critics in attendance giving it positive reviews; Andrew Lloyd Webber tweeted, "I've just had the most exciting night in a theatre for years. @TLBTmusical is an all British musical and it's a total triumph...it will be an international smash."

Alun Hood of WhatsOnStage.com gave it five stars, stating "it's a truly great time in the theatre" and "The thunderous score is a major factor in this: Nick Butcher and Tom Ling's tune-filled, exhilarating work occupies that sweet spot where pop, rock and folk compounds with theatrical bombast." The Observer gave it high praise and called the music "punch-the-air triumph" and the show "Full of the joys of being alive". Arifa Akbar of The Guardian stated: "Nick Butcher's music and lyrics (by Butcher and Tom Ling) are strong and catchy, incorporating pop, jazz and gospel alongside big musical ballads" but that the show felt too "bright eyed". Dominic Cavendish wrote in his review of the year's theatre, in The Telegraph newspaper, that "those worrying where the British musical will go after Andrew Lloyd Webber could take heart from The Little Big Things, an uplifting adaptation by the composer Nick Butcher and others."

== Awards and nominations ==
Year	Award	Category	Nominee	Result
2024	WhatsOnStage Awards	Best New Musical	Nick Butcher, Tom Ling, Joe White	Nominated
2024	WhatsOnStage Awards	Best Performer in a Musical	Ed Larkin	Nominated
2024	WhatsOnStage Awards	Best Supporting Performer in a Musical	Amy Trigg	Nominated
2024	WhatsOnStage Awards	Best Casting Direction	Jill Green	Won
2024	Laurence Olivier Awards	Best New Musical	Nick Butcher, Tom Ling & Joe White	Nominated
2024	Laurence Olivier Awards	Best Actress in a Supporting Role in a Musical	Amy Trigg	Won
2024	Laurence Olivier Awards	Best Theatre Choreographer	Mark Smith	Nominated
2024	The Stage Debut Awards	Best Composer, Lyricist or Book Writer	Nick Butcher & Tom Ling	Nominated

== Synopsis ==
=== Act 1 ===
The show opens with Henry Fraser introducing a story about an accident he experienced at the age of 17. The narrative moves to the summer of 2009, where a younger version of Henry is asked to travel to Portugal with his older brothers, Tom and Will (‘NEVER COMING HOME’). The story introduces the Fraser family, including Henry's younger brother Dom and his parents, Fran and Andrew, who permit Henry to go on the trip if he wins the Schools’ Cup Rugby Final. Henry speaks to Katie, a classmate from art class, and promises to go on a date with her upon his return. After winning the final and resolving an issue with an expired passport, Henry arrives on a Portuguese beach with his brothers (‘FEEL LIKE THIS’).

Suddenly, Fran and Andrew arrive at a Portuguese hospital, frazzled and scared, and they are told that Henry hit his head on a bank of sand whilst diving into the sea, damaging the fourth vertebra in his neck. Henry is paralysed from the top of his shoulders down. In the shock of the news, Fran dissociates and disappears into her memories (‘ONE TO SEVENTEEN’). Man Henry can't remember the accident itself, and though Boy Henry does, he doesn't want to revisit that trauma. They imagine Katie on Henry's date – in a gallery with a perfect boyfriend – staring at a black canvas, ‘a tragic life devoid of colour’. But what does it mean? Henrys wake up in Stoke Mandeville Hospital, meeting the tireless staff, fronted by the no-nonsense Dr Graham (‘WORK OF HEART’). The Fraser family are struggling to cope with their shared trauma, with Dom unable to touch his brother, Andrew wondering if it was all his fault, and Fran nearly rejecting Katie's stacks of cards from his schoolmates – so terrified is she of what Henry's life will be like now. Luckily for her, Henry's ‘brutal but brilliant’ physio, Agnes, is there to help Fran begin to see that there is life after a life-changing accident and that the key lies in accepting change (‘PART OF THE PLAN’).

Henry admits to struggling with acceptance, particularly at night time when he thinks he can hear the sea, so his younger self tries to distract him with joyous memories of their last night on holiday (‘UMA VIDA’). The next day, Henry is told he can go outside for the first time in six weeks, and feels his first ‘little big thing’ in the incredible warmth and colour of the yellow sunlight. But as Andrew pushes his wheelchair back inside, Henry sees his reflection in the hospital doors – the first time he has seen himself since Portugal – and he completely breaks down (‘WHY?’). His younger self tells him to pull it together for the sake of his family, who are also trying to put on brave faces (‘DON’T WANNA HAVE TO’). But Henry is in denial, and doesn't even want to consider Agnes's physiotherapy. Agnes tells him that acceptance and adaptation has to come from his family as much as it does him, and reveals that she can see Boy Henry. She suggests reading Katie's card, which she signed with a bright pink heart. The Henrys read all the messages of support from their loved ones (‘THE WORLD IS WAITING’), helping them find the strength to make their way out of hospital eleven months early.

=== Act 2 ===
Agnes teaches the Fraser family how to ‘adapt for Henry, not the other way around’, and they set about making their home accessible for his return (‘WHAT I NEED’). Henry returns home with a new appreciation: ‘Was the grass always that green?’. However, he finds a different house than the one he left, with his bed in the living room, and even Dom having to take the role as carer. Henry has done so much work, but still hasn't faced the trauma of his accident, and begs Boy Henry to revisit the day on the beach, which he does, painfully (‘SILENCE OF THE SEA’). For the first time, Dom sleeps beside Henry and holds his hand: ‘I felt a warmth I never had before. It’s like the whole room glowed bright orange’.

Trying to find a way forward, Agnes takes Fran and the Henrys on an emancipating night out clubbing (‘THINGS WE SHOULDN’T DO’), which is great fun until they get home, and find a worried Andrew, Tom and Will. The family get into a huge row, and some terrible things are said, leading to Andrew and Fran storming out, and the Fraser brothers fighting it out between them (‘SYMPATHY’). Man Henry breaks it up by telling them they can never go back to how it was and that all of them need to forget Boy. Andrew returns, apologising about the fight, and shows Henry his new invention: an adapted stylus using his ‘purple protector’ gum shield, so that he can make art on his tablet, using his mouth. Henry is grateful but doesn't know what to create, and asks his dad what he would paint. Andrew daydreams about good times with the entire Fraser family on his big red boat (‘MILES AND MILES’), and feels some relief in ‘letting go’ of Boy. Henry finds freedom and joy in painting, and doesn't stop – creating more and more art using his mouth - so many paintings in fact that Fran has secretly arranged a gallery showing, via Agnes, for all his pieces.

Henry goes about inviting all the people from his life to his gallery, including Katie, who he finally gets to take on a date. But before the exhibition itself, he wants the entire Fraser family to go to the beach, and finally look at the bright blue sea. Andrew admits that he sold his boat because they're a team, and him and Fran find some healing in his sacrifice. Henry tells his brothers that they need to let go of the trauma of the accident, and remember Boy how he'd like: nearly as happy as he is now. Agnes drops by to tell the Henrys that the gallery want a big centre-piece for the showing, something ‘personal’, and Henry finally builds up the courage to ask her how he can stop seeing the Boy. She tells him that they never leave, but when you find peace and acceptance, they ‘take a step back’. Henry asks his younger self to help him paint the big centrepiece, where they celebrate their story together and use the pain of their past, to find joy in the present (‘GUIDE YOU’). Boy tells Henry that he would go on the holiday all over again, and that he can't wait to be him, before Henry can finally let him go.

The day of the gallery arrives, and Fran and Andrew take a sneak peek of the centre-piece, which is revealed to be a painting of Andrew's boat. In that moment, Andrew sees a new future for Henry, and is so proud of his son. Henry braces himself to face his audience – mirroring the opening of the show – where he tells us about his story – a story about his life- changing accident at the age of seventeen, and how he wouldn't be who he is without it (‘THE LITTLE BIG THINGS’).

== Original West End Cast Recording ==
The Little Big Things (Original Cast Recording) was released on Friday 12 January 2024 and went straight to #1 on the iTunes album charts.
