= @sohoplace =

West End theatre in London

Coordinates: 51.51569°N 0.13059°W

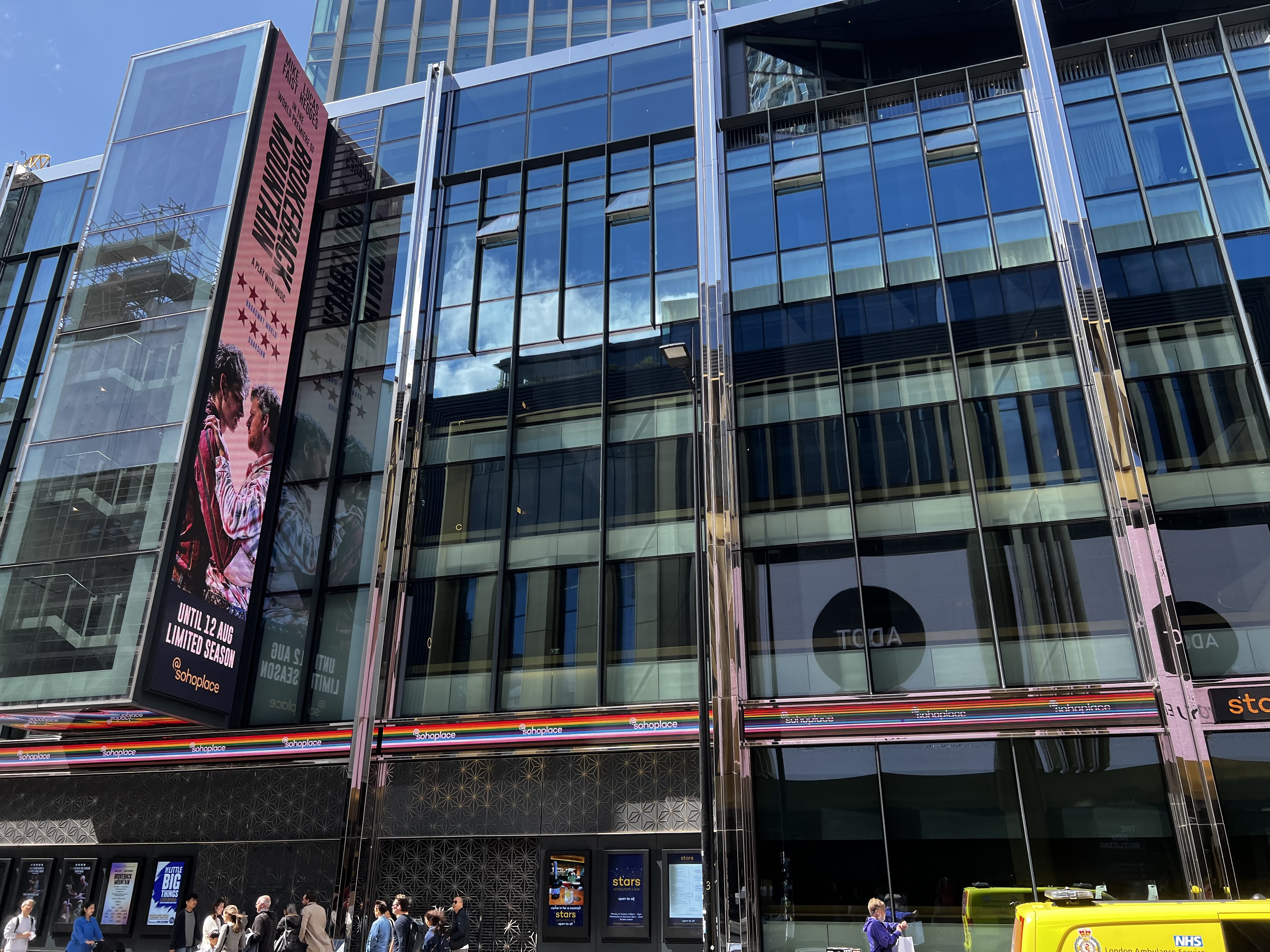
- Facade of the Theatre in July 2023
- Interactive map of @sohoplace
- Address: London; United Kingdom
- Owner: Nimax Theatres
- Capacity: 602
- Type: West End theatre
- Production: Who's Afraid of Virginia Woolf?
- Public transit: Tottenham Court Road

Website
- sohoplace.org

@sohoplace is a West End theatre owned by Nica Burns and operated by Nimax Theatres. It is adjacent to the site of the previous London Astoria, as part of development around the Elizabeth line's Tottenham Court Road station. It is the first purpose-built West End theatre to be opened in 50 years. It opened on 15 October 2022, with a production of the play Marvellous.

== History ==
@sohoplace was built as part of the Crossrail project to redevelop St Giles Circus. This included the demolition of the London Astoria in 2009. Following the opening of the Elizabeth line in May 2022, it was announced that Nimax Theatres would open the new 602-seat theatre in late 2022. The overall development was designed by architects AHMM, whilst Haworth Tompkins designed the auditorium. Derwent London were the developer and Laing O’Rourke constructed the theatre.

== Building ==
In addition to the 602-seat auditorium, the theatre includes a rehearsal room, actors' green room, bar and a terrace, which can also be hired out for rehearsals, conferences, parties and press nights. There is also a large digital front-of-house screen on Charing Cross Road.

The theatre has step-free access to all levels via lift access, and step free seating inside the auditorium.

== Production history ==
- 2022: Marvellous
- 2022: As You Like It
- 2023: Medea
- 2023: Brokeback Mountain
- 2023: The Little Big Things
- 2024: Red Pitch
- 2024: Heathers: The Musical
- 2024: Death of England trilogy
- 2024: White Rabbit Red Rabbit
- 2024: Sensory Cinders
- 2024: A Christmas Carol-ish
- 2025: Kyoto
- 2025: The Fifth Step
- 2025: Every Brilliant Thing
- 2025: The Spy Who Came in from the Cold
- 2026: Marie & Rosetta
- 2026: The Boy Who Harnessed the Wind
- 2026: Tao of Glass
- 2026: Who's Afraid of Virginia Woolf?
