= Emma Kingston =

British stage actress

- Born: Emma Esther Kingston; 19 February 1991 (age 35); Watford, England
- Education: Mountview Academy of Theatre Arts
- Years active: 2013–present

Emma Esther Kingston (born 19 February 1991) is a British stage actress. She is best known for playing Vanessa in the London cast of In the Heights, Eva Perón on the international tour of Evita and Elphaba in Wicked.

== Early life and education ==
Kingston was born at Watford General Hospital to an Argentine mother and a Liverpudlian father, both Jewish. Her maternal grandparents are Argentine and Welsh, with more distant Italian and Turkish roots, while her paternal ancestors had fled to England from Eastern Europe.

Kingston attended Immanuel College. She studied acting at Mountview Academy of Theatre Arts.

== Career ==
=== Musical Theatre ===
Kingston started her acting career playing one of the Divas in the UK tour of Priscilla, Queen of the Desert in 2013.

In 2014 she starred as Vanessa in the London production of In the Heights, with David Bedella as Kevin, Josie Benson as Camilla, Cleve September as Sonny, Victoria Hamilton-Barritt as Daniela, Sam Mackay as Usnavi, Lily Frazer as Nina, Sarah Naudi as Carla, Eve Polycarpou as Abuela and Joe Aaron Reid as Benny. The show was directed by Luke Sheppard and choreographed by Drew McOnie, transferred to the King's Cross Theatre, after a successful run and closed in 2016.

Kingston was due to play the role of Luisa in the Hope Mill Theatre revival of Zorro the Musical in March 2020. The show closed after only two previews due to the COVID-19 pandemic, but transferred to London's Charing Cross Theatre in March–May 2022.

In September 2020 Kingston played Kathy in The Last Five Years alongside Waylon Jacobs at the Minack Theatre in Cornwall.

She was Heather Chandler in the cast of Heathers: The Musical from November 2021 to February 2022, when the show returned to The Other Palace for a limited final run, with Ailsa Davidson as Veronica and Freddie King as J.D.

In 2022 Kingston played the titular role in an online-only revival of BKLYN - The musical, with Jamie Muscato playing Taylor and Marisha Wallace in the role of Paradice.

She joined the cast of the European premiere of The Band's Visit, performing at the Donmar Warehouse from September to December 2022. She played the role of Sammy's Wife and the lead character Dina at certain performances.

Kingston then joined a West End star studded cast in Schwartz at 75, two concert performances in celebration of the famous composer, held in September 2023 at the Lyric Theatre. Also in the cast Kerry Ellis, Louise Dearman, Rachel Tucker, Rob Houchen, Jamie Muscato, Sharon Rose, Hiba Elchikhe and Carl Spencer.

In June 2024 Kingston made her debut in New York at 54 Below with her solo show "My Love Letter to New York". Special guests in the show were Rob Houchen and Courtney Reed.

In January 2025, it was announced that Kingston would play Elphaba in the West End production of Wicked from March 2025, alongside Zizi Strallen as Galinda/Glinda.

== Theatre credits ==
Year	Title	Role	Theatre	Category	Ref.
2013	Priscilla, Queen of the Desert	Diva	UK tour	UK tour	
2014	In the Heights	Vanessa	Southwark Playhouse	Off-West End	
2015	Les Misérables	Ensemble/ u.s. Eponine	Queen's Theatre	West End	
2017	Fiddler on the Roof	Hodel	Chichester Festival Theatre	Regional	
2017-2018	Evita	Eva Perón	International Tour	International Tour	
2020	Zorro The Musical	Luisa	Hope Mill Theatre	Regional	
2020	The Last Five Years	Cathy	Minack Theatre	Regional	
2021-2022	Heathers: The Musical	Heather Chandler	The Other Palace	Off-West End	
2022	The Band's Visit	Sammy's Wife/ Dina at certain performances	Donmar Warehouse	West End	
2025-2027	Wicked	Elphaba	Apollo Victoria Theatre	West End	

== Filmography ==
Year	Title	Role	Notes
2018	Been So Long	BV Trio	
2021	BKLYN the musical	Actor	
