= Broken Wings =

Broken Wings may refer to:

== Music ==
=== Albums ===
- Broken Wings: The Encore Collection, a compilation album by Mr. Mister
- Broken Wings (EP), a 2003 EP by Passerby, now called Flyleaf
- Broken Wings, a 1978 album by Chet Baker

=== Songs ===
- "Broken Wings" (1953 song), a song written by John Jerome and Bernard Grun, which was notably recorded by the Stargazers
- "Broken Wings" (Alter Bridge song) (2004)
- "Broken Wings" (Mr. Mister song) (1985)
- "Broken Wings", a song by Bryan Adams from 11 (2008)
- "Broken Wings", a song by Chris de Burgh from Best Moves (1981)
- "Broken Wings", a song by Tomoko Tane as the ending theme for the anime Trinity Blood

== Other uses ==
- Broken Wings (Gibran novel), a 1912 poetic novel by Kahlil Gibran
  - The Broken Wings, a 1962 film adaptation
- Broken Wings (Thwaites novel), a 1934 novel by F.J. Thwaites
- Broken Wings (1933 film), a French drama film
- Broken Wings (2002 film), an Israeli film
- Broken Wings (ballet), a 2016 ballet about Frida Kahlo

== See also ==
- The Broken Wing (disambiguation)
