= The Broken Wing =

The Broken Wing or Broken Wing may refer to:

- The Broken Wing (1923 film), an American silent film starring Kenneth Harlan and Miriam Cooper
- The Broken Wing (1932 film), an American sound film starring Leo Carillo
- Broken Wing (EP), a 2013 EP by Alkaline Trio
- The Broken Wing (play), a 1920 American play by Paul Dickey and Charles W. Goddard
- The Broken Wing, a collection of Sarojini Naidu's poems
- "Broken Wing", an episode of Cimarron Strip
- "A Broken Wing", a 1997 song by Martina McBride

== See also ==
- The Broken Wings a 1962 film adaptation of the 1912 novel by Khalil Gibran
- Broken Wings (disambiguation)
