= Laurence Olivier Award for Best Actor in a Supporting Role in a Musical =

Annual award for London theatre

- Awarded for: Best Performance by an Actor in a Supporting Role in a Musical
- Location: England
- Presented by: Society of London Theatre
- First award: 2015
- Currently held by: Tom Edden for Paddington: The Musical (2026)
- Website: officiallondontheatre.com/olivier-awards/

The Laurence Olivier Award for Best Actor in a Supporting Role in a Musical is an annual award presented by the Society of London Theatre in recognition of the "world-class status of London theatre." The awards were established as the Society of West End Theatre Awards in 1976, and renamed in 1984 in honour of English actor and director Laurence Olivier.

This award was created in 2015, along with the Best Actress in a Supporting Role in a Musical, to replace the singular award for Laurence Olivier Award for Best Performance in a Supporting Role in a Musical, which existed from 1991 to 2014.

== Winners and nominees ==
=== 2010s ===
Year	Performer	Musical	Character
2015	George Maguire	Sunny Afternoon	Dave Davies
2015	Rolan Bell	Memphis	Delray
2015	Ian Mcintosh	Beautiful	Barry Mann
2015	Jason Pennycooke	Memphis	Bobby
2016
2016	David Bedella	In the Heights	Kevin Rosario
2016	Dan Burton	Gypsy	Tulsa
2016	Peter Davison	Gypsy	Herbie
2016	Gavin Spokes	Guys and Dolls	Nicely Nicely Johnson
2017
2017	Adam J. Bernard	Dreamgirls	James "Thunder" Early
2017	Ian Bartholomew	Half a Sixpence	Chitterlow
2017	Ben Hunter	The Girls	Danny
2017	Andrew Langtree	Groundhog Day	Ned Ryerson
2018
2018	Michael Jibson	Hamilton	King George III
2018	Ross Noble	Young Frankenstein	Igor
2018	Jason Pennycooke	Hamilton	Marquis de Lafayette / Thomas Jefferson
2018	Cleve September	Hamilton	John Laurens / Philip Hamilton
2019
2019	Jonathan Bailey	Company	Jamie
2019	Clive Carter	Come from Away	Various
2019	Richard Fleeshman	Company	Andy
2019	Robert Hands	Come from Away	Various

=== 2020s ===
Year	Performer	Musical	Character
2020
2020	David Bedella	& Juliet	Lance
2020	Stewart Clarke	Fiddler on the Roof	Perchik
2020	Jack Loxton	Dear Evan Hansen	Jared Kleinman
2020	Rupert Young	Dear Evan Hansen	Larry Murphy
2021	Not presented due to extended closing of theatre productions during COVID-19 pandemic (Note: Due to late March 2020 to late July 2021 closing of London theatre productions during the COVID-19 pandemic in England, the 2022 awards recognise productions that launched anytime from February 2020 to February 2022)		
2022
2022	Elliot Levey	Cabaret	Herr Schultz
2022	Clive Carter	Moulin Rouge!	Harold Zidler
2022	Hugh Coles	Back to the Future: The Musical	George McFly
2022	Gary Wilmot	Anything Goes	Elisha J. Whitney
2023
2023	Zubin Varla	Tammy Faye	Jerry Falwell
2023	Sharif Afifi	The Band's Visit	Haled
2023	Peter Polycarpou	The Band's Visit	Avrum
2023	Clive Rowe	Sister Act	Lt Eddie Souther
2024
2024	Jak Malone	Operation Mincemeat	Hester Leggett, Bernard Spilsbury and Others
2024	Cedric Neal	Guys and Dolls	Nicely Nicely Johnson
2024	David Thaxton	Sunset Boulevard	Max von Mayerling
2024	Jack Wolfe	Next to Normal	Gabe Goodman
2025
2025	Layton Williams	Titanique	Iceberg
2025	Andy Nyman	Hello, Dolly!	Horace Vandergelder
2025	Raphael Papo	Fiddler on the Roof	The Fiddler
2025	Tom Xander	Mean Girls	Damian Hubbard
2026
2026	Tom Edden	Paddington: The Musical	Mr. Curry
2026	Trevor Ashley	The Producers	Roger De Bris
2026	Corbin Bleu	The Great Gatsby – A New Musical	Nick Carraway
2026	Jo Foster	Into The Woods	Jack
2026	Oliver Savile	Into The Woods	Cinderella's Prince / Wolf

== Multiple awards and nominations for Best Actor in a Supporting Role in a Musical ==
=== Awards ===
==== Two awards ====
- David Bedella

=== Nominations ===
==== Two nominations ====
- David Bedella
- Clive Carter
- Jason Pennycooke

== See also ==
- Laurence Olivier Award for Best Performance in a Supporting Role in a Musical
- Lists of acting awards
- List of awards for supporting actor
- Tony Award for Best Featured Actor in a Musical
