= Sharif Afifi =

English stage actor

- Years active: 2012–present

Sharif Afifi is an English stage actor. For his performance in The Band's Visit at Donmar Warehouse, he was nominated for a Laurence Olivier Award.

== Early life ==
Afifi grew up in Lytham St Annes, Lancashire. He is of Egyptian descent. He trained in Professional Musical Theatre at the Hammond School in Chester.

== Career ==
Afifi's early work from 2012 to 2017 included a minor role in Rent at Greenwich Theatre, ensemble and understudy roles in The 8th Fold at the Duchess Theatre and on the UK tour of Wonderland, and as Munkustrap in the Royal Caribbean production of Cats. In 2018, he appeared in The Toy Boy Diaries at the Hope Mill Theatre in Manchester and Hadestown at the National Theatre in London. In 2019, he made his U.S. stage debut as Karim in We Live in Cairo at the American Repertory Theater. He also went on the UK tour of On Your Feet! as a cover and in the ensemble.

In 2021, Afifi appeared in the Royal Shakespeare Theatre production of The Magician's Elephant and the Sunset Boulevard concert at Alexandra Palace, and originated the roles of Sultan Valed on the Rumi: The Musical concept album and Osman in You Bury Me at Edinburgh Fringe Festival respectively.

For his performance in The Band's Visit at Donmar Warehouse in 2022, Afifi was nominated for the 2023 Laurence Olivier Award for Best Supporting Actor in a Musical. Also in 2022, he played Freddy Eynsford-Hill in the London Coliseum production of My Fair Lady and starred in Omar Baroud's presentation of After Elijah at The Other Palace. He reunited with Amara Okereke from My Fair Lady for The Light in the Piazza concert at Alexandra Palace.

== Stage ==
| Year | Title | Role | Notes |
|---|---|---|---|
| 2012 | Rent | Junkie | Greenwich Theatre, London |
| 2013 | The 8th Fold | Ensemble | Duchess Theatre, London |
| 2015 | Cats | Munkustrap | Royal Caribbean |
| 2017 | Wonderland | Ensemble / Cheshire Cat understudy | UK tour |
| 2018 | The Toyboy Diaries | Toyboy 2 | Hope Mill Theatre, Manchester |
| 2018 | Hadestown | Worker | National Theatre, London |
| 2019 | We Live in Cairo | Karim | American Repertory Theater, Massachusetts |
| 2019 | On Your Feet! | Ensemble / Emilio Estefan cover | UK tour |
| 2021 | Sunset Boulevard | Artie Green | Concert; Alexandra Palace Theatre, London |
| 2021 | The Magician's Elephant | Milliner / Dance Teacher / Police Officer | Royal Shakespeare Theatre, Stratford-upon-Avon |
| 2021 | You Bury Me | Osman | Edinburgh International Festival |
| 2021 | Rumi: The Musical | Sultan Valed | London Coliseum, London |
| 2022 | My Fair Lady | Freddy Eynsford-Hill | London Coliseum, London |
| 2022 | After Elijah | | The Other Palace, London |
| 2022 | The Band's Visit | Haled | Donmar Warehouse, London |
| 2022 | The Light in the Piazza | Giuseppe Naccarelli | Concert; Alexandra Palace Theatre, London |

== Awards and nominations ==
| Year | Award | Category | Work | Result | Ref. |
|---|---|---|---|---|---|
| 2023 | Laurence Olivier Awards | Best Actor in a Supporting Role in a Musical | The Band's Visit | Nominated | |
