= The Big Gay Jamboree =

- 2025 Off-Broadway production poster
- Music: Marla Mindelle; Jonathan Parks-Ramage
- Lyrics: Marla Mindelle; Philip Drennen
- Book: Marla Mindelle; Jonathan Parks-Ramage
- Premiere: September 14, 2024: Orpheum Theatre (Manhattan)

The Big Gay Jamboree is an off-Broadway comedy musical meta-drama starring Marla Mindelle, who also co-wrote the music, book and lyrics of the show. The book and music were co-written with Jonathan Parks-Ramage, with lyrics by both Mindelle and Philip Drennen. The Big Gay Jamboree began previews on September 14, 2024, and opened officially on October 6, 2024, at the Orpheum Theatre in New York City. It closed on December 15, 2024, after 103 performances.

The musical was produced by LuckyChap Entertainment.

== Synopsis ==
Aspiring actress Stacey, who has a musical theatre degree, finds herself trapped in a Golden Age stage musical in 1945 Bareback, Idaho, after drinking heavily the night before.

As she tries to find a way to escape the seemingly never-ending nightmare of song and dance, Stacey befriends the local townsfolk, most notably the promiscuous Flora, the town music director Clarence, and Bert, the gay lumberjack. Through their time together, Stacey confronts the harmful tropes that bind these characters in the narrative world of musical theatre—namely homophobia, sexism and misogyny, and racism—dispelling the idealized view of Broadway that she once held.

In their mission to discover how Stacey entered the musical world and to return her to the present day—a journey Mindelle has described as a "millennial wizard of oz"— the group of characters learn how to express themselves freely and discover that there is more to the world than life inside a 1940s musical.

== Creative influences and production ==
In an interview with WNYC, Marla Mindelle cited her feelings of frustration and burnout while working as a struggling musical theatre actress as a basis for the musical. The character of Stacey was inspired by Mindelle's experiences prior to her breakthrough in the 2017 jukebox musical Titanique. Reflecting on her childhood immersed in musical theatre, she wanted to evoke the nostalgia of Americana classics such as The Music Man, Singin' in the Rain, Oklahoma!, and Easter Parade. She also aimed to produce a comedy meta-drama that both satirizes classic tropes and addresses problematic stereotypes common throughout the genre of musical theatre, most notably racism, misogyny, and homophobia.

While the musical itself is not strictly parody, the score satirizes classic tropes and sounds in the musical theatre canon with staples like love duets, the "11 o'clock number", and the "I Want" song. The pastiche also draws inspiration from cult classic numbers in musical theatre iconography; The Big Gay Jamboree's number "Not Another Gospel Song" was largely inspired by the 1997 animated film Hercules' number "Zero to Hero". The musical's overarching setting is similar to the 2021 Apple TV+ series Schmigadoon!, which centers around a couple trapped in a golden-age musical.

Australian actress Margot Robbie saw a production of Titanique and contacted Mindelle to express interest in working with her on a new production. In 2019, The Big Gay Jamboree was projected to become a movie musical in which Robbie would star and help produce, alongside director Althea Jones. Instead, the project went on to become a stage production, still backed by Robbie and her production company, LuckyChap Entertainment.

== Productions ==
=== New York City (2024) ===
The musical premiered in previews off-Broadway on September 14, 2024, at the Orpheum Theatre in New York City, ahead of an opening night on October 6, 2024. The production was directed and choreographed by Conor Gallagher, alongside the design team of Sarah Cubbage (costumes), Brian Tovar (lighting), dots (scenery), Justin Stasiw (sound), Aaron Rhyne (projections), and Leah J. Loukas (hair and wigs). David Dabbon provided musical arrangements and supervision.

== Cast ==
Character	New York City (2024)
Stacey	Marla Mindelle
Keith	Alex Moffat
Flora	Natalie Walker
Bert	Constantine Rousouli
Clarence	Paris Nix

== Response ==
The Big Gay Jamboree received mixed reviews; Jackson McHenry of Vulture found it "endearing", despite being "stupid and corny". Zachary Stewart of TheaterMania called the musical a "sparkling example of what intrepid theater makers can achieve off-Broadway", with a humorous satirical presence complemented by a clever and endearing plot. Deb Miller of DC Theatre Arts praised the choreography and "zany humor", and felt the musical had the potential of achieving cult-classic status. Elisabeth Vincentelli of The New York Times wrote that The Big Gay Jamboree was missing the same kind of satirical and vibrant spirit that made Titanique a hit, and further argued that in satirizing the golden age of musical theatre, the work risks lapsing into, and fails to thoughtfully counter, ideas of racism, homophobia, and "witless misogyny".

The Big Gay Jamboree's comedic material and its abundance of pop culture references—such as J-Lo’s career, Renee Rapp concert tickets and niche references to media with large queer fanbases—drew divided responses. Some critics praised the running jokes, which made audiences cheer at their absurdity, while other writers found them forced, preoccupied, and even "gay-obsessed".

=== Awards and nominations ===
Year	Award	Category	Nominee	Result
2025	Drama Desk Award	Outstanding Featured Performance in a Musical	Natalie Walker	Nominated
2025	Drama Desk Award	Outstanding Lyrics	Marla Mindelle and Philip Drennen	Nominated
2025	Drama Desk Award	Outstanding Book of a Musical	Marla Mindelle and Jonathan Parks-Ramage	Nominated
2025	Drama Desk Award	Outstanding Costume Design of a Musical	Sarah Cubbage	Nominated
2025	Outer Critics Circle Awards	Outstanding New Off-Broadway Musical	The Big Gay Jamboree	Nominated
2025	Outer Critics Circle Awards	Outstanding Lead Performer in an Off-Broadway; Musical	Marla Mindelle	Nominated
2025	Outer Critics Circle Awards	Outstanding Featured Performer in an Off-Broadway; Musical	Paris Nix	Nominated
2025	Lucille Lortel Award	Outstanding Musical		Nominated
2025	Lucille Lortel Award	Outstanding Choreographer	Connor Gallagher	Won
2025	Lucille Lortel Award	Outstanding Lead Performer in a Musical	Marla Mindelle	Nominated
2025	Lucille Lortel Award	Outstanding Featured Performer in a Musical	Paris Nix	Won
2025	Lucille Lortel Award	Outstanding Featured Performer in a Musical	Natalie Walker	Nominated
2025	Dorian Award	Outstanding Lead Performance in an Off-Broadway; Production	Marla Mindelle	Nominated
2025	Dorian Award	Outstanding Featured Performance in an Off-Broadway; Production	Paris Nix	Nominated
2025	Dorian Award	Outstanding Featured Performance in an Off-Broadway; Production	Natalie Walker	Nominated
