= Luke Bayer =

English stage actor and singer (born 1992)

- Born: Luke Charles Bayer; 25 August 1992 (age 33); North Yorkshire, England
- Education: Mountview Academy of Theatre Arts
- Occupations: Actor; singer
- Years active: 2005–present

Luke Charles Bayer (born 25 August 1992) is an English actor and singer who is known for his work in musical theatre. He is best known for his work in the Original West End Cast of Everybody's Talking About Jamie at the Apollo Theatre and for appearing on The X Factor in 2007.

== Early life ==
Bayer was born and raised in North Yorkshire, England and attended South Craven School from the age of 11 until he was 18. At the age of 14, Bayer successfully auditioned for The X Factor making it through to Dannii Minogue's judges houses as one of the final six boys where he was eliminated at that stage. In 2012 Bayer started training at Mountview Academy of Theatre Arts in London, graduating 2015.

== Career ==
In 2005, Bayer successfully auditioned for the Les Misérables 20th Anniversary Concert at the Sondheim Theatre, London, in which he performed with 34 other young people who had all appeared in the recently released Schools Edition version of the show.

Upon completing his training at Mountview Academy of Theatre Arts, Bayer toured China with The 12 Tenors.

For his role as Alternate Jamie in the Original West End Cast of Everybody's Talking About Jamie, he won a BroadwayWorld Award for Best Understudy/Alternate in a Show. During his time with the show, Bayer performed as Jamie at Children In Need and West End Live.

Luke played Woof in a Concert Production of Hair, directed by Arlene Phillips, in RENT at the Hope Mill Theatre, playing the role of Mark, and in Millennials at The Other Palace in the summer of 2022. He then did a one-man musical, Diva: Live from Hell! which opened to rave reviews, with The Guardian deeming it 'unmissable'. He also received the 2023 Offie for Best Leading Actor in a Musical, with the show being nominated for a WhatsOnStage Award.

== Theatre ==
Bayer has performed in a number of professional theatre productions. He appeared in the European premiere of Yank! The Musical at the Hope Mill Theatre Manchester in early 2017.

He appeared in the musical Fiver. He won a West End Wilma Award for his role in the show. A cast album of the show has since been recorded and released during the COVID-19 pandemic, featuring Bayer.

At the start of 2023, Luke returned once more to the Hope Mill Theatre in Manchester to perform in the European Premiere of the Broadway Musical Head over Heels (musical) in the lead role of Musidorus.

On 10 June 2025, Bayer joined the West End Cast of Titanique as Jack Dawson.

== Work ==
=== Theatre ===
| Year | Production | Role(s) | Venue | Ref. |
|---|---|---|---|---|
| 2005 | Les Misérables 20th Anniversary Concert | Ensemble | Sondheim Theatre, London | |
| 2017 | Yank! | India | Hope Mill Theatre, Manchester | |
| 2017 | Everybody's Talking About Jamie | Swing/Cover Jamie New | Apollo Theatre, London | |
| 2018 | Everybody's Talking About Jamie | Alternate Jamie New | Apollo Theatre, London | |
| 2019 | Fiver | Man 2 | Southwark Playhouse | |
| 2019 | Soho Cinders | Robbie | Charing Cross Theatre, London | |
| 2021 | I Could Use A Drink (UK premier) | Vocalist | Garrick Theatre, London | |
| 2021 | Hair | Woof | London Palladium | |
| 2021 | Rent | Mark Cohen | Hope Mill Theatre, Manchester | |
| 2022 | Millennials | Performer | The Other Palace Studio | |
| 2022 | Diva: Live from Hell! | Desmond Channing | Turbine Theatre, London | |
| 2023 | Head over Heels (European premier) | Musidorus | Hope Mill Theatre, Manchester | |
| 2024 | Diva: Live from Hell! | Desmond Channing | Kings Head Theatre, London Underbelly Cowgate, Edinburgh | |
| 2024 | Chicago | Mary Sunshine | International Tour, Europe | |
| 2025 | Titanique | Jack | Criterion Theatre | |

=== Television ===
| Year | Production | Role(s) | Broadcasting Channel | Ref. |
|---|---|---|---|---|
| 2007 | The X Factor | Himself | ITV | |
| 2018 | Children in Need | Jamie New | BBC | |
| 2019 | Ackley Bridge | Mathew Barnes | Channel 4 | |

=== Cast recordings ===
| Year | Title | Notes | Ref. |
|---|---|---|---|
| 2018 | Everybody's Talking About Jamie | Featured as part of the Ensemble on the Original West End Cast Recording | |
| 2021 | Fiver - Live Concert Recording | Recorded Live at the Southwark Playhouse | |
| 2024 | Diva: Live From Hell | (New London Studio Cast Recording) | |
