= Broken Wings (musical) =

2018 musical based on Kahlil Gibran's novella

- Music: Nadim Naaman; Dana Al Fardan
- Book: Nadim Naaman; Dana Al Fardan
- Basis: Broken Wings by Kahlil Gibran
- Premiere: 2018: Theatre Royal Haymarket, West End
- Productions: 2018 London; 2019 Beiteddine; 2019 Doha; 2020 Dubai; 2022 London

Broken Wings is a musical based on Kahlil Gibran's 1912 novella of the same title, adapted by Nadim Naaman and Dana Al Fardan. Directed by Bronagh Lagan, the musical premiered at the Theatre Royal Haymarket on the West End in August 2018.

== Production ==
Directed by Bronagh Lagan and orchestrated by Joe Davison, Broken Wings had two workshops and released an original concept album in May 2018 via Auburn Jam Music before premiering at the Theatre Royal Haymarket on London's West End in summer 2018. Naaman himself portrayed Gibran, who serves as a narrator. Hiba Elchikhe, who originated the sole of Selma Karamy on the concept album, withdrew the production a week before opening night for personal reasons and was replaced by Nikita Johal. Other original cast members included Rob Houchen, Soophia Foroughi, Adam Linstead, Nadeem Crowe, Irvine Iqbal and Sami Lamine.

After hosting a pre-tour workshop, Broken Wings was showcased at the 2019 Beiteddine Festival in Lebanon, the Katara Opera House in Doha in November 2019, and the Dubai Opera in January 2020. Benjamin Purkiss, Karl Seth and Bethany Weaver were added to the cast. Johal reprised her role as Selma in Lebanon before it was taken over by Hannah Qureshi for the next two legs. In Dubai, Siubhan Harrison stood in for Foroughi, while Yasmeen Audi and Tim Morgan were added.

In 2022, Broken Wings returned to London with a run at the Charing Cross Theatre. The cast featured Noah Sinigaglia, Lucca Chadwick-Patel, Stephen Rahman-Hughes, Johan Munir, Haroun Al Jeddal, Yasmeen Audi and Ayesha Patel. Naaman and Foroughi reprised their roles. A filmed version of the production was started streaming in December 2022.

== Cast and characters ==
Character	West End	Beiteddine	Doha	Dubai	Off West End
Character	2018	2019		2020	2022
Kahlil Gibran	Nadim Naaman	Nadim Naaman	Nadim Naaman	Nadim Naaman	Nadim Naaman
Selma Karamy	Hiba Elchikhe / Nikita Johal	Nikita Johal	Hannah Qureshi	Hannah Qureshi	Noah Sinigaglia
Young Kahlil Gibran	Rob Houchen	Benjamin Purkiss	Benjamin Purkiss	Benjamin Purkiss	Lucca Chadwick-Patel
Farris Karamy	Adam Linstead	Adam Linstead	Adam Linstead	Karl Seth	Stephen Rahman-Hughes
Mother	Soophia Foroughi	Soophia Foroughi	Soophia Foroughi	Siubhan Harrison	Soophia Foroughi
Karim Bawab	Nadeem Crowe	Nadeem Crowe	Nadeem Crowe	Nadeem Crowe	
Bishop Bulos Galib	Irvine Iqbal	Karl Seth	Karl Seth	Tim Morgan	Johan Munir
Mansour Bey Galib	Sami Lamine	Sami Lamine	Sami Lamine	Sami Lamine	Haroun Al Jeddal
Layla/Leila Bawab	—	Bethany Weaver	Bethany Weaver	Bethany Weaver	Yasmeen Audi
Dima Bawab	—	—	—	Yasmeen Audi	Ayesha Patel

== Reception ==
The 2022 production at Charing Cross Theatre received negative review from Miriam Gillinson in The Guardian, although she praised the performances of Noah Sinigaglia and Soophia Foroughi. Sam Marlowe of The Times wrote that the musical "often looks and sounds pretty, but it too is maddeningly aimless."
