= Broken Wings (Gibran novel) =

1912 literary work by Kahlil Gibran

- Author: Kahlil Gibran
- Original title: الأجنحة المتكسرة
- Language: Arabic
- Genre: Novel/novella
- Publisher: مطبعة جريدة مرآة الغرب
- Publication date: 1912
- Publication place: United States
- Media type: Print

Broken Wings (Arabic: الأجنحة المتكسرة, romanized: al-ajniḥa al-mutakassira) is a poetic novel or novella written in Arabic by Kahlil Gibran and first published in 1912 by the printing house of the periodical Meraat-ul-Gharb in New York. It is a tale of tragic love, set at the turn of the 20th century in Beirut. A young woman, Selma Karamy, is betrothed to a prominent religious man's nephew. The protagonist (a young man that Gibran perhaps modeled after himself) falls in love with this woman. They begin to meet in secret, however they are discovered, and Selma is forbidden to leave her house, breaking their hopes and hearts.

The book highlights many of the social issues of the time in the Eastern Mediterranean, including religious corruption, the rights of women (and lack thereof), and the weighing up of wealth and happiness.

The book was later adapted as the 1962 Lebanese film The Broken Wings.

In 2018, Nadim Naaman and Dana Al Fardan adapted the book as their musical Broken Wings. The world premiere was staged in London's Theatre Royal Haymarket.

== Summary ==
In his novel, Gibran talked about his first love story, and the extent of its impact on his life, so Faris Karama asked him to visit him at his home to tell him more about his past with his father, and to introduce him to his daughter. The writer visited Mr. Karama, and there he met his daughter Salma, and his relationship with Mr. Karama was strong. He loved her from the first sight and became a frequent visitor. He was getting to know more about Salma and increasing his love and attachment to her. Bishop invited Mr. Fares to talk to him about an important matter, which forced him to go on the same night, and this was an opportunity the writer used to confess his love for Salma, who shared the same feeling. When Mr. Fares returned from his meeting with the bishop, he informed Salma about his decision to marry the bishop's nephew, Mansour Bey, who was known for his greed for Salma and her father's property. Mansour Bey married Salma against her will, and months and seasons passed. After this incident, the writer and Salma began to meet once a month in a small temple far from her home, potentially in the Beqaa Valley. In the fifth year of Salma and Mansour Bey's marriage, Salma became pregnant with a child. After giving birth, she and her child died.

== Popular culture ==
- The song "Broken Wings", a US No. 1 and worldwide Top 10 hit for the band Mr. Mister, was inspired by the novel.
