= Rumi: The Musical =

British musical

- Music: Dana Al Fardan, Nadim Naaman
- Lyrics: Dana Al Fardan, Nadim Naaman
- Book: Nadim Naaman
- Setting: 13th-century Konya, Turkey
- Premiere: 23 November 2021: London Coliseum, London

Rumi: The Musical is a musical with music and lyrics by Dana Al Fardan and Nadim Naaman and a book by Naaman. The show is based on a story by Evren Sharma and follows the relationship 13th century poet Rumi and his mentor Shams Tabrizi. The show premiered on 23 and 24 November 2021 as a semi-staged concert at the London Coliseum.

== Production ==
The 2021 London Coliseum production was directed by Bronagh Lagan and choreographed by Anjali Mehra. Music was provided by a 29-piece orchestra, conducted by the show's orchestrator, Joe Davison, with vocal arrangements by Nikki Davison.

In December 2022 the show was staged as part of the 2022 D'reesha Performing Arts Festival in Qatar. This version was cut down to a one hour long concert.

== Plot ==
Despite his loving family in Konya, Rumi yearns to find a spiritual companion ("Find My Guide"). He meets Shams Tabrizi, but their relationship incites jealousy with some of Rumi's followers ("Mad Man"). Meanwhile, Rumi's stepdaughter Kimya has fallen in love with his son, Aladdin, and the two wait for the right time to inform their parents ("When").

Rumi ultimately arranges a marriage between Shams and Kimya, leading Kimya to commit suicide.

== Songs ==
In June 2021 a concept album for the show was released. By November 2021 the album had received over 100,000 streams on Spotify. The show's lyrics are partially derived from Rumi's poetry.

- Overture (Company)
- I Saw The Sun (Rumi and Company)
- Find My Guide (Shams Tabrizi)
- Only Us (Kara and Rumi)
- When (Kimya and Aladdin)
- Say Who Am I (Shams Tabrizi, Rumi, and Company)
- Lightning (Rumi)
- Mad Man (Sayyed, Husam, Sultan Valed, Aladdin and Rumi)
- Changing (Kimya and Kara)
- Shams' Departure (Shams Tabrizi)
- My Light Is Gone/When Reprise (Rumi, Sultan Valed, Kimya and Aladdin)
- Don't (Rumi and Company)
- Rumi's Letter (Sultan Valed, Rumi and Shams Tabrizi)
- Behold The Golden Sun (Rumi and Company)
- Reunited (Rumi and Shams Tabrizi)
- Bless This Marriage (Company)
- Somewhere (Kara and Kimya)
- Mad Man Reprise (Husam, Sayyed, and Aladdin)
- The Moon Of Your Heart (Kimya and Shams Tabrizi)
- Freedom Waits (Kimya and Company)
- I Will Be With You (Kara and Aladdin)
- What Else Is There To Do? (Shams Tabrizi)
- Finale (Rumi, Kara, Sultan Valed, Kimya, Shams Tabrizi, and Company)

== Cast ==
	Concept Album	2021 London Coliseum	2022 Qatar
Rumi	Nadim Naaman		
Shams Tabrizi	Ramin Karimloo		
Kimya	Casey Al-Shaqsy		
Kara	Soophia Foroughi		
Sultan Valed	Sharif Afifi	Yazdan Qafouri	
Aladdin	Ahmed Hamad		
Husam	Irvine Iqbal	Johan Munir	
Sayyed	Alim Jayda	Benjamin Armstrong	

== Reception ==
Broadway World gave the show a positive review, noting that although there were some pacing issues in the first act, the cast was very strong. Theatre Weekly also noted pacing issues, but praised the show's "powerful score".

The New Arab noted how Rumi's poetry had been interwoven with the show's music, but felt that the secondary characters and their relationships were largely underdeveloped, and that some of the acting felt static. TRT World also criticized the show for underdevelopment of its female characters, for basing the work on a story rather than sticking closer to historical accounts, and for a "confusing" plot.
