= Lauren Drew =

Welsh actress and singer

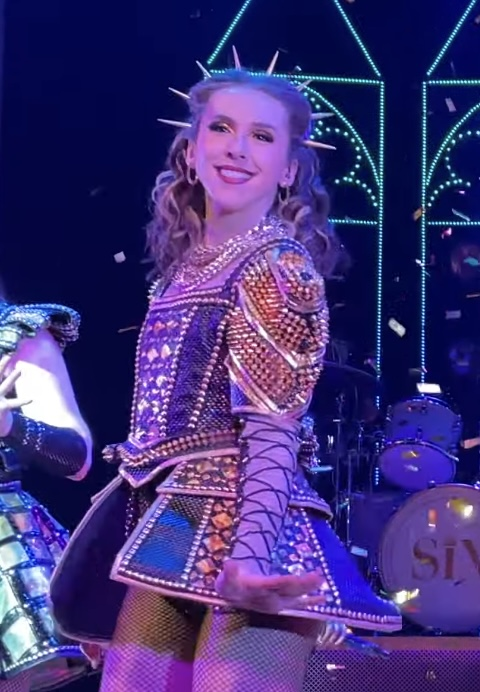
- Drew performing Six in 2022
- Born: 17 February 1993 (age 33); Port Talbot, Wales
- Occupation: Mountview Academy of Theatre Arts
- Years active: 2016–present

Lauren Drew (born 17 February 1993) is a Welsh actress and singer. Known for her work in musical theatre, she won a WhatsOnStage Award and received a Laurence Olivier Award nomination.

== Early life ==
Drew was born in Port Talbot and grew up in a working class family. Drew pursued a BTEC National Diploma in Musical Theatre at Neath Port Talbot College before earning a full scholarship to the Mountview Academy of Theatre Arts, graduating in 2016. That year, Drew was a finalist in the Stephen Sondheim Society Student Performer of the Year competition alongside Courtney Bowman.

== Career ==
Upon graduating from Mountview in 2016, Drew made her professional stage debut in the ensemble of the UK tour of Ghost. This was followed by her West End debut the next year in Kinky Boots at the Adelphi Theatre, and a role in Heathers at The Other Palace in 2018.

Drew played Suzanne in Sweet Charity at the Donmar Warehouse and was the understudy for Eva Perón in Evita at Regent's Park Open Air Theatre in 2019. Drew portrayed Catherine of Aragon on the 2019 UK tour of Six. She would later reprise her role on the 2021 tour of the production as well.

Also in 2021, Drew competed in the tenth series of The Voice UK, auditioning with Jessie J's "Mama Knows Best" to four yeses. She was initially in Anne-Marie's team before being "stolen" by will.i.am. Drew was eliminated in the semi-finals.

Drew returned to Regent's Park Open Air Theatre in 2022 when she played Brooke Wyndham in Legally Blonde. For her performance, Drew was awarded the WhatsOnStage Award for Best Supporting Performer in a Musical. She also played Fantine on the UK tour of Les Misérables. The following year, Drew originated the titular character of the new musical Lizzie, which ran at the Hope Mill Theatre in Manchester, Southwark Playhouse in London, and had a tour. In 2024, Drew portrayed Céline Dion in the jukebox musical Titanique at the Criterion Theatre.

== Theatre ==
Year	Title	Role	Notes
2016	Ghost	Ensemble / Molly Jensen (understudy)	UK tour
2017	Kinky Boots	Ensemble / Nicola Marsden (understudy)	Adelphi Theatre, London
2018	Heathers	New Wave Girl / Heather Chandler (understudy) / Dance Captain	The Other Palace, London
2019	Sweet Charity	Suzanne	Donmar Warehouse, London
2019	Evita	Ensemble / Eva Perón (understudy)	Regent's Park Open Air Theatre, London
2019–2021	Six	Catherine of Aragon	UK tour
2022	Legally Blonde	Brooke Wyndham	Regent's Park Open Air Theatre, London
2022	Les Misérables	Fantine	UK tour
2023	Lizzie	Lizzie Borden	Hope Mill Theatre, Manchester / UK tour / Southwark Playhouse, London
2024	Dirty Rotten Scoundrels	Jolene Oaks	Concert, London Palladium
2024–2025	Titanique	Céline Dion	Criterion Theatre, London

== Awards and nominations ==
Year	Award	Category	Work	Result	Ref.
2023	WhatsOnStage Awards	Best Supporting Performer in a Musical	Legally Blonde	Won	
2023	BWW UK Awards	Best Leading Performer in a New Production of a Musical	Lizzie	Won	
2025	Laurence Olivier Awards	Best Actress in a Musical	Titanique	Nominated	
