= DIVA: Live From Hell =

Dark musical comedy

DIVA: Live from Hell
- Promotional photo for the 2017 production
- Music: Alexander Sage Oyen
- Lyrics: Alexander Sage Oyen
- Book: Nora Brigid Monahan
- Setting: Hell (cabaret act), Ronald Reagan High School (flashbacks)
- Productions: 2013 United Solo Theatre Festival, New York, NY (as Diva); 2017 Theater for the New City, New York, NY (World Premiere of DIVA: Live from Hell); 2018 Pittsburgh Civic Light Opera, Pittsburgh, PA; 2020 Out Front Theatre Company, Atlanta, GA; 2021 Fringe Theatre of Key West, Key West, FL; 2022 The Turbine Theatre, London, UK (London Premiere); 2023 Steel City Arts, Pittsburgh, PA; 2024 King's Head Theatre, London, UK; 2024 Edinburgh Fringe Festival, Edinburgh, UK; 2024 Philadelphia Fringe Festival, Philadelphia, PA; 2025 Teatro Cesgranrio, Rio de Janeiro, BR (Portuguese-language Premiere)

DIVA: Live from Hell is a one-man musical with a score by Alexander Sage Oyen and book and characters by Nora Brigid Monahan. The musical is a dark comedy following Desmond Channing, a deranged high school theatre student, as he retells the events that drove him to murder his drama club rival to an audience at his long-running cabaret act in Hell. The show was originally developed by Less Than Rent Theatre as a short solo comedy under the title Diva and premiered at Theatre Row as part of the 2013 United Solo Theatre Festival.

== Productions ==
The world premiere of DIVA: Live from Hell opened at Theater for the New City in Manhattan on March 23, 2017, and played 16 performances, closing on April 9, 2017. It was directed by Daniel Goldstein and starred Nora Brigid Monahan (then appearing under the name Sean Patrick Monahan) as Desmond Channing and all of the other onstage characters. Broadway veterans Penny Fuller, Charles Busch, and Seth Rudetsky made voiceover cameos in the original production.

In 2018, DIVA: Live from Hell was given a one-night performance by Pittsburgh Civic Light Opera as part of the SPARK festival of small-cast musicals. For this performance, Monahan once again played Desmond Channing and Oyen served as musical director and pianist.

In 2020, a London production was announced to open at the Jack Studio Theatre, directed by Joe McNeice and starring Jak Malone of Operation Mincemeat. The production was slated to begin performances on March 17, 2020, but was canceled due to the COVID-19 pandemic. In 2022, a new production directed by McNeice opened at The Turbine Theatre in London starring Luke Bayer, who received rave reviews, and received a 2023 Offie for Best Leading Actor in a Musical. Bayer returned to the show in 2024 in a remounted production that played London's King's Head Theatre before a critically acclaimed run at the Edinburgh Fringe Festival.

A Portuguese translation of the musical premiered in Rio de Janeiro in 2025 under the title Diva: Ao Vivo do Inferno! The production was directed by Hugo Kerth, who also starred as Desmond Channing.

Other productions include a second Pittsburgh production in 2023 at the Steel City Arts Foundation's Sunken Bus Studios starring comedian Matty Malloy and a Philadelphia production in 2024 starring Jack Taylor as part of the Philadelphia Fringe Festival.

== Recordings ==
A Diva: Live from Hell original cast album was released in 2019, featuring a new studio recording of the score as well as live recordings from the 2017 world premiere production. The double album featured Nora Brigid Monahan as Desmond Channing and the following track list:

1. "The Overture!" – Desmond Channing
2. "Live from Hell!" – Desmond Channing
3. "Highest Heights!" – Desmond Channing, Evan Harris
4. "His Best Friend!" – Allie Hewitt
5. "Strong!" – Evan Harris
6. "The Big Time!" – Desmond Channing, Mr. Dallas
7. "Diva!" – Mr. Dallas, Desmond Channing
8. "How's the Show?!" – Desmond Channing, Allie Hewitt, Mr. Dallas
9. "The Executive Order!" – Desmond Channing
10. "Rock Bottom!" – Desmond Channing
11. "Desmond's Epiphany!" – Desmond Channing
12. "The Bows!" – Desmond Channing
13. "Live From Hell! (Live Version)" – Desmond Channing
14. "Highest Heights! (Live Version)" – Desmond Channing, Evan Harris
15. "His Best Friend! (Live Version)" – Allie Hewitt
16. "Strong! (Live Version)" – Evan Harris
17. "The Big Time! (Live Version)" – Desmond Channing, Mr. Dallas
18. "Diva! (Live Version)" – Mr. Dallas, Desmond Channing
19. "How's the Show?! (Live Version)" – Desmond Channing, Allie Hewitt, Mr. Dallas
20. "The Executive Order! (Live Version) – Desmond Channing
21. "Rock Bottom! (Live Version)" – Desmond Channing
22. "Desmond's Epiphany! (Live Version)" – Desmond Channing

In 2023, a London studio cast recording featuring Luke Bayer was released, which featured a larger band with new orchestrations as well as several additional excerpts from monologues in the show on the following track list:

1. "Overture!" – Desmond Channing
2. "All About Evan!" – Desmond Channing
3. "Live from Hell!" – Desmond Channing
4. "Dear Evan Harris!" – Desmond Channing, Evan Harris, Mr. Dallas
5. "Highest Heights!" – Desmond Channing, Evan Harris
6. "His Best Friend!" – Allie Hewitt
7. "Strong!" – Evan Harris
8. "The Big Time!" – Desmond Channing, Mr. Dallas
9. "The Letter!" – Desmond Channing
10. "Diva!" – Mr. Dallas, Desmond Channing
11. "How's the Show?!" – Desmond Channing, Allie Hewitt, Mr. Dallas
12. "The Executive Order!" – Desmond Channing
13. "Rock Bottom!" – Desmond Channing
14. "Desmond's Epiphany!" – Desmond Channing
15. "He Gets Me!" – Desmond Channing
16. "Finale!" – Desmond Channing
17. "Bows!" – Desmond Channing
