= Hannah Lowther =

English actress (born 1997)

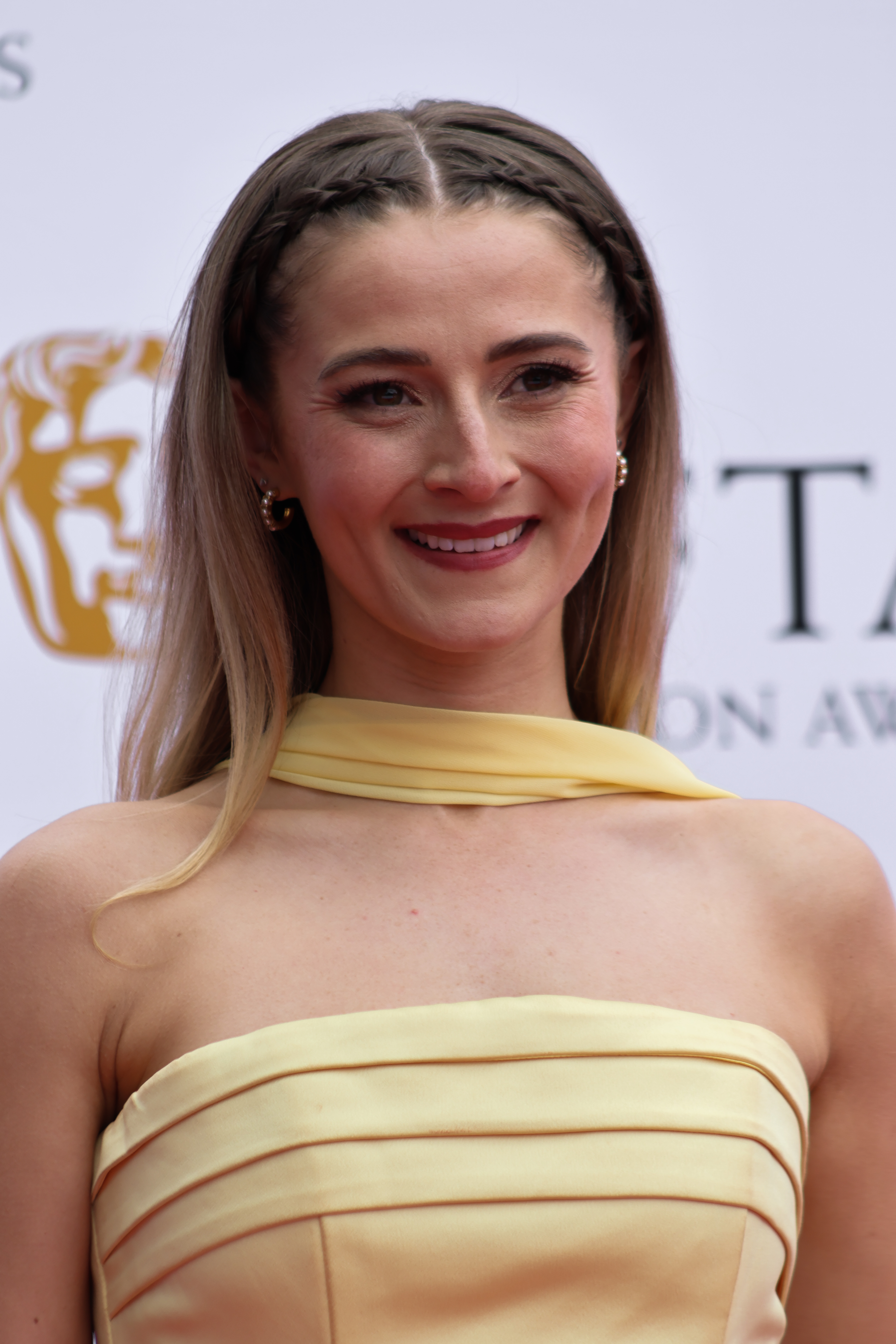
- Lowther in 2026
- Born: Hannah Louise Lowther; 11 September 1997 (age 29); Basingstoke, Hampshire, England
- Occupation: Actress
- Years active: 2008–present

Hannah Louise Lowther (born 11 September 1997) is an English actress and social media personality. She began a musical theatre career as a child, appearing in various productions including The Sound of Music, Oliver! and Chitty Chitty Bang Bang. Then in 2020, she amassed an online following on TikTok after posting videos whilst working at Tesco. Lowther was then cast in more high-profile roles, including appearing in Heathers, SpongeBob SquarePants, the West End theatre production of Six and a UK touring production of Legally Blonde.

== Life and career ==
Hannah Louise Lowther was born on 11 September 1997 in Basingstoke, Hampshire. She grew up in Oakley and attended Testbourne Community School. She began her stage career as a child, appearing in productions including The Sound of Music, Oliver! and Chitty Chitty Bang Bang. Lowther trained at the Italia Conti Academy of Theatre Arts, before going on to study at the London School of Musical Theatre. She graduated in July 2019 and was starting to get stage roles until the COVID-19 pandemic impacted live theatre. She therefore took a job in her local Tesco shop, a job she was grateful for due to the job market becoming competitive in the pandemic.

Whilst working at Tesco, Lowther missed the creativity of being on stage and began creating videos on TikTok. Her first video to go viral was a rendition of Dolly Parton's "9 to 5", with the lyrics altered to Tesco references. She quickly amassed a following after creating singing and dancing videos, and in 2021, she was cast in the Other Palace's production of Heathers: The Musical. She was cast as New Wave Party Girl in the ensemble, as well as the understudy for the lead characters. She later became the only person to have played all three lead roles in one run, most notably filling in for the role of Heather Duke, a role she was not the official understudy for, with four hours' notice.

Also in 2022, she made various theatre appearances, including Babies the Musical, Millennials and Kinky Boots in Concert, as well as a one-off appearance at an Emojiland concert. She also portrayed the titular role of Snow White in a pantomime production of Snow White and the Seven Dwarfs. In 2023, she was cast in the UK premiere of SpongeBob SquarePants, which toured across the country. She was cast as Karen Plankton. She then appeared in No Limits at the Turbine Theatre. Later in 2023, she was cast in the West End theatre production of Six as an alternate. She remained in the show until 2025.

In 2025, Lowther began presenting the podcast How Very Hannah. The premise of the series sees her interviewing notable theatre figures. In mid-2025, Lowther was cast as Margot and as the alternate Elle Woods in the UK and Ireland touring production of Legally Blonde. She will appear in the production from 2026 to 2027 and will portray Elle once a week, as well as in performances where lead Amber Davies is absent.

== Acting credits ==
Year	Title	Role	Venue	Ref.
2008	The Sound of Music	Brigitta Von Trapp	London Palladium	
2009	Oliver!	Ensemble	Theatre Royal	
2010	Chitty Chitty Bang Bang	Jemima Potts	UK tour	
2017	Snow White and the Seven Dwarfs	Snow White	The King's Theatre	
2019	Cinderella	Ensemble	The Arc Theatre	
2022	Heathers: The Musical	New Wave Party Girl /u/s Heather Chandler/Heather MacNamara; e/c Heather Duke	The Other Palace	
2022	Babies the Musical	Becky	Workshop	
2022	Millennials	Millennial	The Other Palace	
2022	Kinky Boots in Concert	Gemma Louise	Theatre Royal	
2022	Emojiland	Kissy Face	Garrick Theatre	
2022	Snow White and the Seven Dwarfs	Snow White	New Wimbledon Theatre	
2023	SpongeBob SquarePant s	Karen Plankton	UK tour	
2023	No Limits	Catfish	Turbine Theatre	
2023–2025	Six	Alternate Catherine Parr/Katherine Howard/Anne Boleyn	Vaudeville Theatre	
2026–2027	Legally Blonde	Margot / Alternate Elle Woods	UK tour	

== Awards and nominations ==
Year	Ceremony	Category	Nominated work	Result	Ref.
2024	bCreator Awards	Entertainment Creator of the Year	Herself	Nominated	
2026	bCreator Awards	Podcast of the year	How Very Hannah	Pending	
