= Millennials (musical) =

Musical by Elliot Clay

- Music: Elliot Clay
- Lyrics: Elliot Clay
- Book: Elliot Clay
- Premiere: May 3, 2019: The Other Palace
- Productions: 2021 Workshop; 2022 Off West-End

Millennials is a musical with book, music and lyrics by Elliot Clay. It is described as a "pop song cycle".

== Productions ==
=== Workshop ===
Millennials was due to hold its first "work in progress" performances in February 2021 as part of MTFestUK. It was initially scheduled to play to an in-person audience, but was then planned to move online with the rest of the festival due to the coronavirus pandemic. The performances were postponed to May 2021, before embarking on a digital tour, with in person performances taking place at the Turbine Theatre. Casting for the work in progress performances featured Luke Bayer, Allie Daniel, Beth Hinton-Lever, Nathan Lorainey-Dineen, Tim Mahendran, Grace Mouat and Jodie Steele.

=== Off-West End ===
An Off-West End run was announced to begin at The Other Palace Studio on 8 July 2022, in a limited run to 7 August, with direction by Hannah Benson. The cast featured Luke Bayer, Hiba Elchikhe, Luke Latchman, Hannah Lowther, Rob Madge, and Georgina Onuorah, with Latchman replacing the previously announced Ivano Turco.

The production extended to 4 September 2022 with a new cast featuring Georgina Castle, Lucca Chadwick-Patel, Jarnéia Richard-Noel, Cleve September, Rhys Taylor and Becca Wickes.

The production was subsequently nominated for ‘Best Off-West End Production’ at the WhatsOnStage awards.
