= Marla Mindelle =

American musical theatre actress

- Born: Marla Danielle Weiner; December 22, 1984 (age 41)
- Education: University of Cincinnati (BFA)
- Occupations: Actress; singer
- Years active: 2006–present

Marla Mindelle (born December 22, 1984 as Marla Danielle Weiner) is an American actress, singer, writer, and producer. Mindelle is most known for being the co-creator, writer, producer, and composer of The Big Gay Jamboree and Titanique.. In April 2025 she received the Laurence Olivier Award for Best Entertainment or Comedy Play for the West End Production of Titanique. In 2026 Mindelle was nominated for three Tony Awards for her work in Titanique including the Tonys for Best Musical, Best Book of a Musical, and Best Actress in a Musical.

== Life and career ==
Mindelle grew up in Yardley, Pennsylvania and graduated from Pennsbury High School in 2002. She is the daughter of Ryta (née Mindelle) and Stephen Weiner. She has two sisters, Lisa and Olivia. Following her graduation from the University of Cincinnati – College-Conservatory of Music at the University of Cincinnati in 2006, Mindelle joined the first national tour of The Drowsy Chaperone in 2007 in the role of Kitty. She next made her Broadway debut as a replacement in the 2008 Broadway revival of South Pacific. In 2011, she originated the role of Sister Mary Robert in Sister Act. In 2013, she originated the role of Gabrielle in the first Broadway production of Rodger and Hammerstein's Cinderella.

Mindelle is the co-creator, writer, producer, and composer of The Big Gay Jamboree and Titanique. As an improvisional comedian, she has performed comedy live and through online content.

On May 5, 2026 Mindelle was nominated for three Tony Awards for Titanique. Mindelle garnered nominations for Best Musical, Best Book of a Musical, and Best Actress in a Musical.

== Personal life ==
Mindelle suffers from severe tinnitus, a condition that causes ringing or buzzing in the ears. Mindelle has stated in interviews she identifies as queer and a lesbian.

== Stage credits ==
Year	Title	Role	Notes	Venue	Ref.
2007	The Drowsy Chaperone	Kitty		U.S. National Tour	
2009	Cole Porter's The Pirate	Mafalda		Regional, Prince Music Theatre	
2010	South Pacific	Ensign Cora MacRae		Broadway, Vivian Beaumont Theatre	
2011	Sister Act	Sister Mary Robert		Broadway, Broadway Theatre	
2013	Cinderella	Gabrielle		Broadway, Broadway Theatre	
2022	Titanique	Céline Dion	co-writer, book	Off-Broadway, Asylum NYC and Daryl Roth Theatre	
2024	The Big Gay Jamboree	Stacey	book, music and lyrics	Off-Broadway, Orpheum Theatre	
2026	Titanique	Céline Dion	co-writer, book	Broadway, St. James Theatre	

== Awards and nominations ==
Year	Award	Category	Work	Result	Ref.
2011	Outer Critics Circle Award	Outstanding Featured Actress in a Musical	Sister Act	Nominated	
2023	Outer Critics Circle Award	Outstanding Book of a Musical	Titanique	Nominated	
2023	Outer Critics Circle Award	Outstanding Lead Performer in an Off-Broadway Musical	Titanique	Nominated	
2023	Drama Desk Award	Outstanding Book of a Musical	Titanique	Nominated	
2023	Drama League Award	Distinguished Performance	Titanique	Nominated	
2023	Lucille Lortel Award	Outstanding Lead Performer in a Musical	Titanique	Won	
2024	Obie Award	Distinguished Performance	Titanique	Won	
2025	Drama Desk Award	Outstanding Book of a Musical	The Big Gay Jamboree	Nominated	
2025	Drama Desk Award	Outstanding Lyrics	The Big Gay Jamboree	Nominated	
2025	Outer Critics Circle Award	Outstanding Lead Performer in an Off-Broadway Musical	The Big Gay Jamboree	Nominated	
2025	Dorian Award	Outstanding Lead Performance in an Off-Broadway Production	The Big Gay Jamboree	Nominated	
2025	Laurence Olivier Awards	Best Entertainment or Comedy Play	Titanique	Won	
2026	Drama League Award	Outstanding Production of a Musical	Titanique	Nominated	
2026	Drama League Award	Distinguished Performance	Titanique	Nominated	
2026	Tony Awards	Best Actress in a Musical	Titanique	Nominated	
2026	Tony Awards	Best Book of a Musical	Titanique	Nominated	
2026	Tony Awards	Best Musical	Titanique	Nominated	
