= Nadim Naaman =

British actor, singer, and composer

- Born: 12 August 1985 (age 41); Westminster, London, England
- Education: University of Warwick; Royal Academy of Music
- Years active: 2007–present
- Children: 2

Nadim Naaman (born 12 August 1985) is a British actor, singer, playwright, and composer. He is known for his work in musical theatre.

== Early life ==
Naaman was born in London to a Lebanese father and a British mother who had met in Dubai. Naaman attended Eton College. He took part in choir, and the school's head of drama Simon Dormandy suggested Naaman pursue the performing arts professionally. His father was supportive but suggested he get a university degree first. Naaman graduated from the University of Warwick in 2006 with a Bachelor of Arts in Theatre and Performance Studies and completed a Postgraduate Diploma in Musical Theatre at the Royal Academy of Music in 2007.

== Career ==
Upon completing his diploma, Naaman made his professional stage debut as Jamie Wallerstein in the 2007 Edinburgh Fringe Festival production of the musical The Last Five Years. The following year, he made his West End debut when he took over as Rolf Gruber in The Sound of Music at the London Palladium. Naaman starred as the titular character of James and the Giant Peach at Watermill Theatre in 2009, appeared in Knight Crew at Glyndebourne in 2010, and was in the ensemble of The Phantom of the Opera at Her Majesty's Theatre on the West End. He was also the understudy in the latter for Raoul.

After leaving The Phantom of the Opera, Naaman appeared in Thirteen Days at the Arcola Theatre and Marguerite at the Tabard Theatre, and played Anatoly in the Union Theatre production of Chess. Naaman released his debut album of 11 songs he had written over the course of a decade titled We All Want The Same in 2013. He subsequently played Charles Clarke in Titanic at Southwark Playhouse and the Princess of Wales Theatre and Anthony in the Tooting Arts Club production of Sweeney Todd: The Demon Barber of Fleet Street. He was also an understudy for Alan and Alfie in One Man, Two Guvnors.

From 2015 to 2017, Naaman returned to the West End production of The Phantom of the Opera, starring as Viscount Raoul de Chagny. Through the independent record label Auburn Jam Music, Naaman released his second album Sides in 2016, containing a combination of original songs and reinvented covers and featuring artists such as Celinde Schoenmaker, Rob Houchen, and Eva Noblezada. In 2017, he starred in Andrew Lloyd Webber's By Jeeves at the Old Laundry Theatre in Cumbria.

With Dana Al Fardan, Naaman co-wrote and co-composed the musical Broken Wings, based on Lebanese-American writer Kahlil Gibran's 1912 novella of the same name, with Naaman portraying Gibran in the original cast. The musical premiered at the Theatre Royal Haymarket in 2018 and was subsequently showcased at the 2019 Beiteddine Festival, Doha's Katara Opera House, and Dubai Opera in early 2020. Naaman once again collaborated with Al Fardan on Rumi: The Musical, which premiered at the London Coliseum in 2021. Naaman starred as the titular character opposite Ramin Karimloo on the concept album and original cast.

Naaman once again returned to The Phantom of the Opera for its 2023 and 2024 international tour in the Middle East, this time starring as the titular Phantom.

== Personal life ==
As of 2015, Naaman lived in Southfields, London. That year, he ran the London Marathon for the Make a Difference (MAD) Trust. Naaman married his wife Gillian in December 2016. They have two daughters.

== Discography ==
- We All Want The Same (2013)
- Sides (2016)

== Stage ==
| Year | Title | Role | Notes |
|---|---|---|---|
| 2007 | The Last Five Years | Jamie Wellerstein | Edinburgh Fringe Festival |
| 2008 | The Sound of Music | Rolf Gruber | London Palladium |
| 2009 | James and the Giant Peach | James | Watermill Theatre, Newbury |
| 2010 | Knight Crew | Lance | Glyndebourne, Sussex |
| 2010 | The Phantom of the Opera | Ensemble / Raoul cover | Her Majesty's Theatre, London |
| 2012 | Thirteen Days | Andrei | Arcola Theatre, London |
| 2012 | Marguerite | Armand | Tabard Theatre, Chiswick |
| 2013 | Chess | Anatoly | Union Theatre, London |
| 2014–2015 | Titanic | Charles Clarke | Southwark Playhouse, London / Princess of Wales Theatre, Toronto |
| 2014 | One Man, Two Guvnors | Alan / Alfie cover | Theatre Royal Haymarket, London |
| 2015 | Sweeney Todd: The Demon Barber of Fleet Street | Anthony | Tooting Arts Club |
| 2015–2017 | The Phantom of the Opera | Raoul de Chagny | Her Majesty's Theatre, London |
| 2017 | By Jeeves | Bertie Wooster | Old Laundry Theatre, Bowness-on-Windermere |
| 2018 | Broken Wings | Kahlil Gibran | Created with Dana Al Fardan; Theatre Royal Haymarket, London |
| 2018 | On the Town | Ozzie | BBC Proms, Royal Albert Hall |
| 2020 | A Little Night Music | Count Carl-Magnus | Opera Holland Park |
| 2021 | Rumi: The Musical | Rumi | Co-wrote and composed with Dana Al Fardan; London Coliseum |
| 2023 | Doctor Zhivago in Concert | Viktor Komarovsky | London Palladium |
| 2023–2024 | The Phantom of the Opera | The Phantom | International tour |
| 2025–2026 | My Fair Lady | Henry Higgins | The Mill at Sonning, Reading |
