= The Magician's Elephant (musical) =

2021 musical

- Production poster
- Music: Marc Teitler
- Lyrics: Nancy Harris; Marc Teitler
- Book: Nancy Harris
- Basis: The Magician's Elephant by Kate DiCamillo
- Premiere: 18 October 2021: Royal Shakespeare Theatre, Stratford-upon-Avon
- Productions: 2021 Stratford-upon-Avon 2024 Sandy, Utah

The Magician's Elephant is a musical with book and lyrics by Nancy Harris and music and lyrics by Marc Teitler, based on the 2009 children's novel of the same name by Kate DiCamillo.

== Production history ==
=== Stratford-upon-Avon (2021) ===
The musical was announced to make its world premiere as part of the Royal Shakespeare Company's winter 2020 season, running in the Royal Shakespeare Theatre in Stratford-upon-Avon. However, due to the ongoing COVID-19 pandemic, the production was postponed to run over the 2021 winter season running from 18 October 2021 to 1 January 2022.

The production is directed by Sarah Tipple, designed by Colin Richmond with lighting design by Oliver Fenwick.

On 9 July 2021, initial casting was announced and a recording of a song from the show "If This Is True" was released on YouTube, followed by another song "A Lot Like Me" released on 26 July 2021.

=== Sandy, Utah (2024) ===
The musical made its United States premiere at Hale Center Theatre in Sandy, Utah during their 2024 season, running from September 16 to October 19 2024. The production was directed by Dave Tinney with scenic design by Jenn Taylor and puppetry design, fabrication and direction by AchesonWalsh Studios, lighting design by Jaron Kent Hermansen.

== Stage licensing ==
In 2025, Music Theatre International (MTI) acquired the licensing rights to The Magician's Elephant. The show is now available for performance by community theaters, schools, and other amateur groups. This release allows broader access to the musical, following its original production by the Royal Shakespeare Company in 2021. The licensing includes materials such as scripts, scores, and director guides, making it accessible for non-professional theater companies to stage their own productions.

== Cast and characters ==
Character	Stratford-upon-Avon	Sandy, Utah
Character	2021	2024
Narrator	Amy Booth-Steel	Mack Malia Morris
Peter Duchene	Jack Wolfe	Joshua Hyrum Smith Weston Wright
Vilna Lutz	Mark Meadows	Ric Starnes Mark Knowles
Adele	Miriam Nyarko	Hailey Burnham Paige Hochalter
Leo Matienne	Marc Antolin	Keith Evans
Gloria Matienne	Melissa James	Jordyn Aspyn Durfey Becky Jeanne Knowles
Countess Quintet	Summer Strallen	Korianne Johnson Michelle Blake
Count Quintet	Sam Harrison	Brett Myers Justin Bills
Madame LaVaughn	Renu Arora	DeLayne Dayton Sharon Lynn Kenison
The Magician	Alastair Parker	Josh Durfey Bryan Dayley
The Elephant	Zoe Halliday	Jordan Dahl Sam Cooper
The Elephant	Wela Mbusi	Benjamin Tate Julia Wihongi
The Elephant	Suzanne Nixon	Miranda Renee Smith Daniel Miskin
The Elephant	—N/a	Jessica Zöe Bird Sarah Neipp
Police Chief	Forbes Masson	Zac Zumbrunnen Jake Ben Suazo
Milliner / Dance Teacher / Police Officer	Sharif Afifi	Aitana Alapa Sara Schmidt
Baker / Police Officer	Alison Arnopp	Ren Cottam Ian Webb
Young Police Officer / Lamplighter	Chrystine Symone	Riley Groves Maxx Teuscher
Sister Marie	Mandi Symonds	Michelle Sundwall Brittany Andam
Lisette	Lauren Jones	Fay Pauline Drysdale Elisabeth Wilkins
Mrs Griswald	Wendy Somerville	Mak Milord Brooke Holladay
Fishmonger	Lucca Chadwick-Patel	Zachary Ballard Ammar Al Saffar
Doctor	Stephen John Davis	Jordon LeBaron Andrew Reeser
Peter's Mum / Swing	Hannah Brown	Jackie Marshall Brittany James
Peter's Dad / Swing	Michael Carolan	Riley Groves Maxx Teuscher
Swing	Rianna Ash	—N/a
Swing	Matt Bateman	—N/a

== Musical Numbers ==
Act I

- "Welcome To the Town of Baltese" – Narrator
- "Discipline, Control, Routine" – Lutz
- "If This Is True" – Peter
- "What If Why Not Could It Be" – Leo Matienne
- "No One Must Know" – Police Chief and Police
- "Your Mind Is Playing Tricks On You" – Police Chief and Police
- "Discipline, Control Routine" (reprise) – Lutz
- "I Intended Only Lilies" – Magician and Madame LaVaughn
- "Secrets" – Company
- "Follow The Elephant" – Company
- "Elephant Messiah" – Company
- "If This Is True" (reprise) – Peter

Act II

- "The Sight Of The Elephant" – Company
- "Adele The Brave" – Adele
- "A Lot Like Me" – Peter
- "Two Of a Kind" – Company
- "Don’t Spoil It Pt. 1" – Company
- "Don’t Spoil It Pt. 2" – Company
- "Real Magic" – Company
- "Count Who Doesn’t Count" – Count and Adele
- "What Good Are Dreams" – Company
- "If This Is True" – Peter
- "A Lot Like Me" – Peter
- "Anything Could Happen" – Company

== Reception ==
The Stratford-upon-Avon production received positive reviews from the critics and audiences receiving mostly four star reviews.
