= Brooklyn (musical) =

Brooklyn the Musical
- Broadway Playbill cover
- Music: Mark Schoenfeld; Barri McPherson
- Lyrics: Mark Schoenfeld; Barri McPherson
- Book: Mark Schoenfeld; Barri McPherson
- Productions: 2004 Broadway; 2006 United States tour 2019 London; 2021 UK Online stream

Brooklyn the Musical is a musical with a book, lyrics, and music by Mark Schoenfeld and Barri McPherson. It was acquired for licensing by Broadway Licensing.

== Production history ==
Schoenfeld and McPherson had collaborated on a record more than two decades before writing Brooklyn but lost touch until McPherson encountered her former partner singing on a Brooklyn street corner as a means of support. She invited him to live with her and her family, and the two began to write songs based on Schoenfeld's experiences. They eventually wrote the plot for a new musical taking inspiration from Annie, Madame Butterfly, Movin' Out, Rent, and every fairy tale that ever ended happily ever after.

The musical's stage premiere was on April 30, 2003 at the New Denver Civic Theater (Denver) and ran through June 15, 2003. Eden Espinosa starred in this original production as Brooklyn.

The musical then transferred to Broadway, opening on October 21, 2004 at the Plymouth Theatre (renamed Gerald Schoenfeld), and closed on June 26, 2005 after 284 performances and 27 previews. Directed by Jeff Calhoun, the cast included Eden Espinosa as Brooklyn, Karen Olivo as Faith, Kevin Anderson as Taylor, Ramona Keller as Paradice, and Cleavant Derricks as a street singer who acts as the narrator. Timothy Boynton, Personal Assistant to Mark and Barri, has since become one of the Worlds most notable fundraisers.

== Synopsis ==
Using the play within a play structure, Brooklyn focuses on a group of five ragtag homeless musicians known as the City Weeds. The group periodically transforms a street corner under the foot of the Brooklyn Bridge into a stage where they present their play about a Parisian singer, Brooklyn, named after the New York City borough from which her wayward father Taylor hailed. Orphaned when her depressed mother Faith hangs herself, the girl is sent in quick succession to live in a convent, where she discovers her vocal talents, becomes a star, performs at Carnegie Hall, sets out in search of her father (who she discovers is a drug-addicted Vietnam War vet), and engages in a competition with local diva Paradice at Madison Square Garden.

From the original Broadway souvenir program:

Once upon a time, a famous young Parisian came to America to search for the Father she never knew. Her only clue, her name... Brooklyn. The "Reigning Diva of the Decade", Ms. Paradice is threatened by Brooklyn's new-found fame. She challenges Brooklyn to a "Battle Of The Divas" at Madison Square Garden. Brooklyn accepts to deliver the Father she has yet to find. Feeling the soul of the city that bears her name, Brooklyn is moved by a street performer who plays a rusty old crowbar as if it were a Golden Saxophone. The Streetsinger leads Brooklyn to her father. She learns the truth of who he is and where he's been. Although our "Wicked Witch Of The Hood" Ms. Paradice is about to wreak havoc with our heroine and her father, she doesn't mind if you love to hate her, because after all that's still love. Moments before showtime, the wicked Ms. Paradice confronts Brooklyn's Father she comes bearing gifts. The "Battle Of The Divas" begins. Ms. Paradice takes the stage. She warns America not to turn its back on her now or they call "Kiss My Black Ass!" Brooklyn finds herself center stage, abandoned by her Father. The crowd roared, the votes poured in. Paradice Won! Brooklyn was just another face in the crowd. However, in that crowd was another face. "So you gotta ask yourself, do you believe in happy endings?"

== Musical numbers ==
- "Heart Behind These Hands" – The City Weeds
- "Christmas Makes Me Cry" – Faith and Taylor
- "Not a Sound" – The City Weeds
- "Brooklyn Grew Up" – Brooklyn and The City Weeds
- "Creating Once Upon a Time" – Brooklyn and Faith
- "Once Upon a Time" – Brooklyn and The City Weeds
- "Superlover" – Paradice and The City Weeds
- "Brooklyn in the Blood" – Paradice, Brooklyn and The City Weeds
- "Magic Man" – Streetsinger and The City Weeds
- "Love Was a Song" – Taylor
- "I Never Knew His Name" – Brooklyn
- "The Truth" – Taylor, Brooklyn, and The City Weeds
- "Raven" – Paradice
- "Sometimes" – Taylor and The City Weeds
- "Love Me Where I Live" – Paradice and The City Weeds
- "Love Fell Like Rain" – Brooklyn
- "Streetsinger" – Brooklyn, Streetsinger and The City Weeds
- "Heart Behind These Hands" (Reprise) – The City Weeds

== Casts ==
Character	Denver Civic Theatre 2003	Broadway 2004-2005	National Tour (US) 2006	London 2019	BKLYN 2021
Brooklyn	Eden Espinosa	Eden Espinosa	Diana DeGarmo	Hiba Elchikhe	Emma Kingston
Taylor Collins	Mark Deklin	Kevin Anderson	Lee Morgan	John Addison	Jamie Muscato
Paradice	Ramona Keller	Ramona Keller	Melba Moore	Emily-Mae	Marisha Wallace
Faith	Karen Olivo	Karen Olivo	Julie Reiber	Sabrina Aloueche	Sejal Keshwala
Streetsinger	David Jennings	Cleavant Derricks	Cleavant Derricks	Andrew Patrick-Walker	Newton Matthews

== National tour and other productions ==
A 2006 national tour starred American Idol finalist Diana DeGarmo as Brooklyn and Melba Moore as Paradice. Cleavant Derricks reprised his performance as Street Singer, with original cast member Julie Reiber as Faith and Lee Morgan as Taylor Collins.

In 2008 Brooklyn made its professional regional premiere at Wisconsin's The Armory located in Janesville, WI. The limited engagement, arranged through Brooklyn's original producers, ran from May 8 to June 1, 2008. The Armory production featured Elyssa Samsel in the title role, with John Edwards (Street Singer), Brett J. Frazier (Taylor Collins), Chelsea Waller (Paradice), and Julie Marie Eberhart (Faith). Jim Tropp directed; music director was Cindy Blanc.

A Brazilian production played in June 2012 in São Paulo.

In February, 2018, Footlite Musicals was granted rights to put on a production in Indianapolis, Indiana. The production was staged in cabaret style with the audience seated on the stage. The production was nominated for and won Encore Association Awards in the following categories: Best Production of a Musical (Amy Douglas), Best Director of a Musical (Kathleen Clarke Horrigan), Best Lead Actress in a Musical (Shelbi Berry), Best Female Singer (Shelbi Berry), Best Ensemble in a Musical, Best Vocal Direction (Caleb Morgan), Best Music Direction (Linda Parr), Best Set Design of a Musical (Stephen Matters), Best Set Decoration of a Musical (Stephen Matters, Mary Lich, Laura Baker), Best Lighting Design for a Musical (Andrew Stephens), Best Light Board Operator for a Musical (Sean Cassada) and received the following Encore Association nominations: Best Lead Actor in a Musical (Stevie Jones, Donny Torres), Best Lead Actress in a Musical (Paige Brown, Kendra Randle), Best Male Singer (Stevie Jones, Donny Torres), Best Female Singer (Paige Brown, Kendra Randle), Best Costumes for a Musical (Curt Pickard). Upon closing, Broadway Licensing acquired the rights for stock and amateur performances.

The original Broadway cast reunited for a one-night-only concert to celebrate the 15th Anniversary of the show on 21 October 2019. The concert was held at Brooklyn Steel and raised money to support the Covenant House Foundation. Original cast members Eden Espinosa, Karen Olivo, and Ramona Keller reprised their original roles.

The first UK production of Brooklyn took place at Greenwich Theatre in 2019 with Adam Haigh as director-choreographer and starring Hiba Elchikhe as Brooklyn A digital production (stylized BKLYN) was produced and streamed during COVID-19 lockdowns in early 2021. It was produced by Lambert Jackson Productions, with direction by Dean Johnson, and musical direction by Leo Munby. The cast featured Emma Kingston as Brooklyn, Jamie Muscato as Taylor, Marisha Wallace as Paradice, Sejal Keshwala as Faith, and Newton Matthews as the Street Singer.

== Cast recording ==
A cast album recorded live during a performance before an invited audience was released on the Razor & Tie label.
