= Hiba Elchikhe =

Actress

- Born: 12 November 1992 (age 34); Hammersmith, London, England
- Education: Mountview Academy of Theatre Arts
- Years active: 2015–present

Hiba Amina A. Elchikhe (born 12 November 1992) is an English actress. She is known for her work in theatre.

== Early life ==
Elchikhe was born in Hammersmith, West London and is of Moroccan and Egyptian descent. She speaks four languages. She attended the BRIT School at age 16 and went on to graduate from the Mountview Academy of Theatre Arts with a Bachelor of Arts (BA) in Musical Theatre.

== Career ==
Elchikhe made her professional stage debut with an understudy role on the 2015 Asia tour of Ghost and gained prominence through her lead role as Jasmine on the 2017 Australia tour of Aladdin. In 2018, she made her London stage debut in Antony and Cleopatra at the National Theatre and originated the role of Selma Karamy in Broken Wings for its concept album and at the Theatre Royal Haymarket.

In 2019, Elchikhe starred in the titular role of Brooklyn for its UK premiere at Greenwich Theatre. She also appeared in Fiver at Southwark Playhouse.

Having originally been cast in 2020, Elchikhe assumed the role of Pritti Pasha in Everybody's Talking About Jamie at the Apollo Theatre on the West End and the Ahmanson Theatre in Los Angeles. In the meantime during lockdown, Elchikhe created an online theatre-themed web series titled Out of the Darkness, Into the Spotlight in collaboration with Nimax and the Theatre Café. She also appeared in Well-Behaved Women at Cadogan Hall.

In 2022, Elchikhe returned to Southwark Playhouse for Lift, appeared in the Off West End run off Millennials at the Other Palace, and originated the role of Charisse in The Time Traveller's Wife at Storyhouse, a role she would reprise on the West End at the Apollo in 2023. Elchikhe and fellow The Time Traveller's Wife star Tim Mahendran announced the 24th WhatsOnStage Award nominations.

In 2025, Elchikhe assumed the role of Rose DeWitt Bukater in Titanique at the Criterion Theatre on the West End.

== Stage ==
| Year | Title | Role | Notes |
|---|---|---|---|
| 2015 | Ghost | Mrs Santiago / Molly (cover) | Asia tour |
| 2017 | Aladdin | Jasmine | Australia tour |
| 2018 | Broken Wings | Selma Karamy | Concept album / Theatre Royal Haymarket, London |
| 2018 | Antony and Cleopatra | Soothsayer | National Theatre, London |
| 2019 | Fiver | Woman | Southwark Playhouse, London |
| 2019 | Brooklyn | Brooklyn | Greenwich Theatre, London |
| 2020, 2021–2022 | Everybody's Talking About Jamie | Pritti Pasha | Apollo Theatre, London / Ahmanson Theatre, Los Angeles |
| 2021 | Well-Behaved Women | Cleopatra / Malala Yousafzai | Cadogan Hall, London |
| 2022 | Lift | Secretary | Southwark Playhouse, London |
| 2022 | Millennials | | The Other Palace, London |
| 2022–2023 | The Time Traveller's Wife | Charisse | Storyhouse, Chester / Apollo Theatre, London |
| 2024 | Here & Now | Neeta | The Alexandra, Birmingham |
| 2025 | Titanique | Rose DeWitt Bukater | Criterion Theatre, London |
