= Dana Al Fardan =

- Genres: Contemporary classical; pop; musical theatre
- Occupations: Composer; songwriter
- Website: https://www.danaalfardan.com/

Dana Al Fardan (born 29 July 1985) is a Qatari composer and songwriter. She is known for being the first female Qatari contemporary composer, singer and songwriter, for being the first Qatari woman to sing in English, and for being the cultural ambassador for the Qatari Philharmonic Orchestra. Al Fardan's style is a mixture of classical and contemporary music with strong Arabic influences. Her debut album, Paint, was released in 2013, with which Dana achieved nationwide recognition.

== Early life and education ==
Al Fardan was born on July 29, 1985, in Doha, Qatar. She is the daughter of Ali Al Fardan and Shafiqa Habib. She is the eldest of 6 sisters: Noor, Jawaher, Hind, Najla, and Zuhoor. Al Fardan began to demonstrate musical talent at an early age. She spent hours playing the keyboard and performing musicals at home with her sisters.

However, Al Fardan did not initially pursue music as a career. She studied international relations at the American University of Sharjah (UAE). After graduating, Al Fardan moved to London, England, where she obtained a second degree, this time in gemology from the Gemological Institute of America in London (GIA). After finishing her gemology degree, she came back to Qatar to work in the family business — the Alfardan Group — created in 1954 by her grandfather Ibrahim Alfardan.

== Career ==
In 2012 Al Fardan decided to change career. In the third trimester of her pregnancy, she returned to London and recorded her first album, which was completed after she gave birth to her daughter. According to Al Fardan, Layla’s birth in London was the turning point in her life, as she was inspired by her daughter to radically transform her life and pursue her true calling to be a musician.

Al Fardan’s first album, Paint, was released in November 2013. This album was produced by Tim Baxter in collaboration with twelve string players from the London Metropolitan Orchestra and mastered at Abbey Road Studios.

In 2017, Al Fardan released her orchestral album, Sandstorm, which blended strings, soloists and choral vocals with traditional Middle Eastern rhythms. Sandstorm was recorded at Katara Studios in Doha. On November 20, 2016, Sandstorm was performed in concert by the Qatar Philharmonic Orchestra at Katara Opera House, and also for the UN Day Concert on 24 October, 2019. After a visit to Moscow in 2017, Al Fardan's music was chosen to be performed in the city to celebrate the launch of the Qatar-Russia Year of Culture 2018 both by visiting members of the Qatar Philharmonic and Russian musicians.

One year later, in 2018, Al Fardan presented her sold out West End musical Broken Wings in the Theatre Royal Haymarket in London. Broken Wings was a musical adaptation of Khalil Gibran’s poetic novel, originally published in 1912. The play, co-written and co-composed with Nadim Naaman, aimed to showcase the rich Arab philosophy and literature of Khalil Gibran. It was directed by Bronagh Lagan, produced by Ali Matar with orchestrations by Joe Davison. Broken Wings was also showcased in 2019 in Lebanon at the Beiteddine Festival, as both Khalil Gibran and Nadim Naaman are Lebanese. Broken Wings was also presented in the Dubai Opera House in January 2020, and in Doha at Katara Opera House in November 2019. Both presentations were sold-out shows.

In March 2019, Al Fardan held the ‘Sounds for Qatar’ concert, hosted by Qatar National Library in Doha. The concert included previous work such as ‘The Sounds of the Library’ and ‘Dialogues’, respectively commissioned by the Qatar National Library, Qatar Museums and Qassim Al Thani Museum. During this concert, she also performed live for the first time the song ‘Raise our Flag’, composed by Al Fardan and dedicated to the Qatari national football team for their performance during the 2019 Asian Cup.

Al Fardan began 2021 with a series of collaborative projects. One of these projects was the musical Rumi, which is based on a story about the 13th century philosopher and poet Rumi by Evren Sharma. Rumi was created in collaboration with Nadim Naaman and featured West End and Broadway star Ramin Karimloo. An album for the show was recorded in London and Doha during the COVID-19 pandemic. Additionally, Al Fardan presented her composition ‘Rising’ in collaboration with the AFCENT Band (U.S. Air Force Central Band) to celebrate the Qatar-USA 2021 Year of Culture that was officially inaugurated at the Katara Cultural Village Opera House on January 15, 2021.

== Activism ==
Al Fardan is also known for her philanthropic endeavours. In 2019, she volunteered for humanitarian work in Gaza along with the Qatar Red Crescent Society (QRCS), United Nations Secretary General’s Humanitarian Envoy and United Nations Relief and Works Agency (UNRWA) for Palestine Refugees in the Near East. They launched the "Bring Hope for Gaza" campaign to provide families with food for Ramadan. Al Fardan visited some UNRWA schools, hospitals, and community centres in the Palestinian refugee camps in Amman to shed light on the situation in Gaza, with an aim to encourage others to support the Palestinian community in Gaza. Al Fardan composed a song for the campaign that went live during Ramadan, accompanied by a video of her visit to the UNRWA schools in Jordan. The song was aired on the UNRWA website and some TV channels during Ramadan.

== Awards ==
The impact of her work is of essential importance in the MENA region, as she is the first female English artist to emerge from Qatar. Her work was recognised in 2017, when she was named the "Woman Of The Year" at the Grazia Style Awards 2017.

== Notable performances ==
- Sandstorm, London (2017)
- Qatar Russia Year of Culture, Russia (2017)
- Qatar National Day, New York (2018)
- UNESCO Majlis Exhibition, Paris (2018)
- United Nations 74th Anniversary, New York (2019)
