= Titanique =

2017 jukebox musical

- 2022 Off-Broadway poster
- Music: Various
- Lyrics: Various
- Book: Tye Blue; Marla Mindelle; Constantine Rousouli
- Basis: Titanic by James Cameron
- Premiere: 14 December 2017: Sorting Room Theatre
- Productions: 2022 Off-Broadway; 2024 West End; 2026 Broadway
- Awards: Laurence Olivier Award for Best Entertainment or Comedy Play

Titanique (sometimes stylized as Titaníque) is a jukebox musical featuring music of Celine Dion, with a book by Tye Blue, Marla Mindelle, and Constantine Rousouli, with music supervision, arrangements, and orchestration by Nicholas James Connell. The musical is a parody of the 1997 film Titanic, and the story is a retelling of the movie's events from Dion's perspective.

Following its Los Angeles premiere in 2017, the show opened off-Broadway at the Asylum Theatre in June 2022, before later transferring to the Daryl Roth Theatre. The production won three Lucille Lortel Awards in 2023, including Outstanding Musical. The show opened in the West End in 2025, winning two Olivier Awards including Best Entertainment or Comedy Play. A 2026 Broadway transfer was nominated for four Tony Awards, including Best Musical.

== Premise ==
In the present-day, Celine Dion hijacks a Titanic museum tour, where she claims to have survived the Titanic's sinking. Celine begins to narrate her version of what really happened to Jack and Rose, and the other characters from the movie on the night the Titanic sank.

The musical is partially improvised, and uses several pop culture references, including references to RuPaul's Drag Race and Unbreakable Kimmy Schmidt.

== Productions ==
=== Los Angeles (2017) and New York (2018) concerts ===
The first version of the show played at Los Angeles' Sorting Room Theater as a one-night-only experience titled Titanique: In Concert on 14 December 2017. Book writer Tye Blue directed, with co-writers Marla Mindelle and Constantine Rousouli starring as Céline Dion and Jack, respectively, with Alex Ellis as Rose and music direction by Nicholas Connell who also arranged and orchestrated the music. Other cast members included Peter Porte, Tom Lenk, Drew Droege, Sebastian La Cause, Katherine Tokarz, Tom Detrinis, and Adam Zelasko.

Another concert staging was given at New York City's Green Room 42 inside the Yotel hotel on 25–27 August 2018 with Mindelle, Rousouli, Ellis, La Cause, and Zelasko returning. Joining the cast were Stephen Guarino, Kathy Deitch, Mikhail Thompson, and Mykal Kilgore. It returned to the Green Room for six more performances from 30 November to 3 December 2018.

=== Off-Broadway (2022–2025) ===
A fully-staged off-Broadway production began previews at The Asylum Theatre in New York City on 14 June 2022, with an official opening on 23 June 2022. It was once again directed by Blue, music directed by Connell, and choreographed by Ellenore Scott. It starred Mindelle as Dion, Rousouli as Jack, Ellis as Rose, Frankie Grande as Victor Garber, Deitch as Margaret "Molly" Brown, Ryan Duncan as Ruth, John Riddle as Cal, and Jaye Alexander as The Iceberg. The creative team was rounded out with scenic design by Gabriel Hainer Evansohn, costumes by Alejo Vietti, sound design by Lawrence Schober, lighting by Paige Seber, and hair/makeup/wigs by Tommy Kurzman. The production was seen by several people associated with the film, such as Garber, as well as Dion's manager and publicist. The production won Lucille Lortel Awards for Outstanding Musical, lead performer in a musical (Mindelle) and costume design (Vietti). Also nominated were Scott for choreography and Riddle as featured performer.

In November 2022, the production transferred to the Daryl Roth Theatre with the same creative team. Several members of the company remained, except for Ellis, Deitch, Duncan, and Alexander, who were replaced by Carrie St. Louis, Desireé Rodriguez, Russell Daniels, and Avionce Hoyles, respectively. Mark Evans took over the role of Cal, and Wulf Clark was a replacement as Garber, on 24 December 2022. Rosé assumed the role of Garber on 26 January 2023, followed by Willam Belli who took over the role on 5 September 2023. The show closed at the Daryl Roth Theatre on 29 June 2025.

=== Australia and Canada ===
An Australian production opened at The Grand Electric in Sydney. The musical began performances on 12 September 2024, and starred Marney McQueen as Dion. It closed on 22 June 2025.

A Canadian production of Titanique played at the Segal Centre for Performing Arts in Montreal from 27 October to 24 November 2024, starring Véronique Claveau. The production then transferred to the CAA Theatre in Toronto, running from 5 December 2024 through 19 January 2025. After this, the production returned to the Segal Centre between 2 and 16 February 2025. The musical's first French language production opened in Montreal at the Studio de l'Espace St-Denis in June 2026, again starring Claveau. It is expected to tour to Quebec City later in the year.

=== West End (2024–present) ===
Titanique opened in the West End at the Criterion Theatre in previews on 9 December 2024, with an official opening on 9 January 2025. It is set to run until at least 3 January 2027. It starred Lauren Drew as Celine Dion, Rob Houchen as Jack, Kat Ronney as Rose, Darren Bennett as Victor Garber, Charlotte Wakefield as Margaret "Molly" Brown, Stephen Guarino as Ruth, Jordan Luke Gage as Cal, and Layton Williams as The Iceberg. In June 2025 Houchen, Ronney, Guarino, Gage and Williams left the production and were replaced by Luke Bayer, Hiba Elchikhe, Carl Mullaney, Richard Carson and Tosh Wanogho-Maud respectively. Astrid Harris took over the role of Dion on 15 July 2025. Jenny O'Leary took over the role of Brown on 22 July 2025. Tim Walton took on the role of Garber on 2 September 2025. Ryan Carter took over the role of The Iceberg on 7 October 2025. It adopts British cultural references such as Gemma Collins, EastEnders and Jonathan Bailey's musical dance number "Dancing Through Life" in the film Wicked. It was nominated for three Olivier Awards, winning Best Entertainment or Comedy Play and Best Actor in a Supporting Role for Layton Williams.

=== Chicago, Paris and Brazil (2025) ===
Titanique was produced in Chicago by Porchlight Music Theatre and Broadway in Chicago, directed by Tye Blue. It opened at the Broadway Playhouse on 25 March 2025, starring Clare Kennedy McLaughlin as Céline Dion, and closed on 13 July 2025.

The musical opened in Paris, France, on 24 April 2025 at the Théâtre du Lido on the Champs-Élysées. It played in São Paulo, Brazil, in 2025 at the Teatro Frei Caneca, starring Alessandra Maestrini, Giulia Nadruz and Marcos Veras.

=== Broadway (2026) ===
The musical began performances at Broadway's St. James Theatre on March 26, 2026, with an opening night on April 12. Mindelle, Grande, Riddle and Rousouli reprised their roles, joined by Melissa Barrera as Rose, Deborah Cox as Molly Brown, and Jim Parsons as Ruth. Layton Williams reprised his role as the Seaman/Iceberg from the West End production. The production was nominated for Best Musical, Best Book, Leading Actress (for Mindelle), and Featured Actor (for Williams) at the 79th Tony Awards.

=== North American tour (2027) ===
A North American tour is expected to begin in 2027.

== Musical numbers ==
Act I

- Overture – Company
- "I'm Alive" – Celine Dion and Company
- "Taking Chances" – Company
- "Taking Chances (reprise)" – Rose
- "Seduces Me" – Cal
- "If You Asked Me To" – Rose, Celine, and Jack
- "Beauty and the Beast" – Celine, Peabo Bryson, and Company (Note: The actor playing Seaman / Iceberg performs this song as Peabo Bryson)
- "I'm Alive (reprise)" – Irish Lady (Note: The actress playing Molly Brown performs this song as the "Irish Lady" character)
- "You and I" – Jack and Company
- "Tell Him" – Molly Brown, Rose, and Celine
- "To Love You More" – Jack, Rose, and Company

Act II

- "Who Let the Dogs Out" – Celine
- "I Drove All Night" – Victor Garber
- "Because You Loved Me" – Celine, Rose, and Jack
- "Where Does My Heart Beat Now" – Jack, Cal, Rose, and Company
- "I Drove All Night (reprise)" – Victor Garber and Seaman
- "River Deep, Mountain High" – Iceberg and Company
- "I Surrender" / "Seduces Me (reprise)" – Rose and Cal
- "I Surrender (reprise)" – Victor Garber, Celine, and Company
- "All By Myself" – Molly Brown
- "The Prayer" – Rose and Company
- "All by Myself (reprise)" – Molly Brown
- "My Heart Will Go On" – Celine and Company
- "A New Day Has Come" – Company
- "My Heart Will Go On (reprise)" – Company

== Cast and characters ==
| Character | Off-Broadway | West End | Broadway |
| Character | 2022 | 2024 | 2026 |
|---|---|---|---|
| Céline Dion | Marla Mindelle | Lauren Drew | Marla Mindelle |
| Jack Dawson | Constantine Rousouli | Rob Houchen | Constantine Rousouli |
| Rose DeWitt Bukater | Alex Ellis | Kat Ronney | Melissa Barrera |
| Victor Garber / Luigi | Frankie Grande | Darren Bennett | Frankie Grande |
| Molly Brown | Kathy Deitch | Charlotte Wakefield | Deborah Cox |
| Ruth DeWitt Bukater | Ryan Duncan | Stephen Guarino | Jim Parsons |
| Cal Hockley | John Riddle | Jordan Luke Gage | John Riddle |
| The Seaman / Iceberg (Note: The actor playing Seaman / Iceberg performs Beauty and the Beast as Peabo Bryson) | Jaye Alexander | Layton Williams | Layton Williams |

=== Notable replacements ===
==== Off-Broadway ====
- Rose: Cassadee Pope

==== West End ====
- Jack: Luke Bayer
- Rose: Hiba Elchikhe, Ailsa Davidson
- Ruth: William Hanson, Myra DuBois

== Reception ==
Titanique developed an audience off Broadway through word-of-mouth referrals. The original off-Broadway production moved to the larger Daryl Roth Theatre. GLAAD attributed the musical's extended run to its celebration of queer culture, campy humor and pop culture references that appealed to theater fans and the LGBTQ community.

Elisabeth Vincentelli of The New York Times praised the show's absurdity and campy nature, mentioning that it embraces the over-the-top elements of both Titanic and Céline Dion. Johnny Oleksinski, in the New York Post, also praised the show's campy humor, describing it as "outrageously funny", and Mindelle's performance as Dion. Robert Hofler of The Wrap said the show was "really funny" and offers a refreshing take on familiar material.

Charles Isherwood of The Wall Street Journal found the music to be "blandly adult contemporary", although he thought the show entertaining and praised the infectious joy of the cast. James Kleinmann of The Queer Review highlighted the show's appeal to queer audiences, praising the wit of its book and array of pop culture references. He stated that the production's campy and festive atmosphere sets the tone for a show that is "both beautifully crafted and joyfully irreverent".

== Awards and nominations ==
=== 2022 Off-Broadway production ===
| Year | Award | Category | Nominee | Result |
|---|---|---|---|---|
| 2023 | Lucille Lortel Awards | Outstanding Musical | | Won |
| 2023 | Lucille Lortel Awards | Outstanding Lead Performer in a Musical | Marla Mindelle | Won |
| 2023 | Lucille Lortel Awards | Outstanding Featured Performer in a Musical | John Riddle | Nominated |
| 2023 | Lucille Lortel Awards | Outstanding Choreographer | Ellenore Scott | Nominated |
| 2023 | Lucille Lortel Awards | Outstanding Costume Design | Alejo Vietti | Won |
| 2023 | Drama League Award | Outstanding Production of a Musical | | Nominated |
| 2023 | Drama League Award | Distinguished Performance Award | Marla Mindelle | Nominated |
| 2023 | Drama Desk Award | Outstanding Book of a Musical | Marla Mindelle, Constantine Rousouli, Tye Blue | Nominated |
| 2023 | Outer Critics Circle Award | Outstanding Book of a Musical | Marla Mindelle, Constantine Rousouli, Tye Blue | Nominated |
| 2023 | Outer Critics Circle Award | Outstanding Lead Performer in an Off-Broadway Musical | Marla Mindelle | Nominated |
| 2024 | Obie Award | Distinguished Performance | Marla Mindelle | Won |

=== Original West End Production ===
| Year | Award | Category | Nominee | Result |
|---|---|---|---|---|
| 2025 | Laurence Olivier Awards | Best Entertainment or Comedy Play | | Won |
| 2025 | Laurence Olivier Awards | Best Actress in a Musical | Lauren Drew | Nominated |
| 2025 | Laurence Olivier Awards | Best Actor in a Supporting Role in a Musical | Layton Williams | Won |

=== 2026 Broadway production ===
| Year | Award | Category | Nominee | Result | Ref. |
|---|---|---|---|---|---|
| 2026 | Drama League Awards | Outstanding Production of a Musical | | Nominated | |
| 2026 | Drama League Awards | Distinguished Performance | Marla Mindelle | Nominated | |
| 2026 | Drama League Awards | Distinguished Performance | Constantine Rousouli | Nominated | |
| 2026 | Drama Desk Awards | Outstanding Featured Performance in a Musical | Layton Williams | Nominated | |
| 2026 | Tony Awards | Best Musical | | Nominated | |
| 2026 | Tony Awards | Best Performance by a Leading Actress in a Musical | Marla Mindelle | Nominated | |
| 2026 | Tony Awards | Best Performance by a Featured Actor in a Musical | Layton Williams | Nominated | |
| 2026 | Tony Awards | Best Book of a Musical | Tye Blue, Marla Mindelle, Constantine Rousouli | Nominated | |
| 2026 | Dorian Award | Outstanding Featured Performance in a Broadway Musical | Layton Williams | Won | |
| 2026 | Dorian Award | Outstanding Featured Performance in a Broadway Musical | Melissa Barrera | Nominated | |
| 2026 | Dorian Award | Broadway Showstopper Award | "River Deep, Mountain High", Layton Williams | Nominated | |
