= Rob Houchen =

British stage actor

- Born: 10 February 1991 (age 35); United Kingdom
- Education: Guildford School of Acting
- Occupations: Actor, Producer
- Years active: 2013–present

Rob Houchen (born 10 February 1991) is a British stage actor and producer. He is best known for playing Marius in Les Misérables in both its 30th Anniversary international production as well as at the Queen's Theatre and Fabrizio in The Light in the Piazza at the Royal Festival Hall.

== Early life and education ==
Houchen is from Lowestoft, Suffolk. He attended Pakefield Primary and Middle schools, Kirkley High School and East Norfolk Sixth Form College. He trained at the Guildford School of Acting in London, graduating with a BA hons in musical theatre.

== Career ==
=== Stage ===
Houchen started his career onstage in 2013 in the musical Les Misérables as Marius Pontmercy.

In 2019 Houchen was part of the London premiere of the musical The Light in the Piazza in the role of Fabrizio. The show starred Dove Cameron as Clara and Renée Fleming as Margaret. The show transferred to the LA Opera in October of the same year with the same principal cast, including Houchen.

He then reprised the role of Marius in the staged concert version of Les Misérables at the Gielgud Theatre in August 2019.

In 2020 Houchen joined the cast of the Donmar Warehouse production of City of Angels, after its transfer to the Garrick Theatre. The show, starring Vanessa Williams, opened in early March 2020 and closed shortly after due to the COVID-19 pandemic.

In May 2022 Houchen was part of the cast of Stephen Sondheim's Old Friends: A Celebration. The gala concert was a celebration of the famous composer, who passed the year before, and was staged by Matthew Bourne and Maria Friedman. The show was recorded live on 3 May 2022 and included stage stars like Michael Ball, Judi Dench, Bernadette Peters and Jenna Russell.

Houchen played Lieutenant Joseph Cable in the 2022 Chichester Festival Theatre production of South Pacific, at the Manchester Opera House, Sadler's Wells and UK tour. The cast also included Julian Ovenden as Emile de Becque, Gina Beck as Ensign Nellie Forbush and Joanna Ampil as Bloody Mary.

Houchen joined the cast of the musical Titanique in December 2024 for its West End premiere as Jack. The show played at the Criterion Theatre with a cast including Lauren Drew as Celine Dion, Darren Bennett as Victor Garber/Luigi, Jordan Luke Gage as Cal, Stephen Guarino as Ruth and Kat Ronney as Rose.

In 2025, Houchen joined the studio recording cast of Jo, the Little Women Musical as Laurie. The album is due to be released in 2025 and a semi-staged version of the show is also due to be announced.

Year	Title	Role	Theatre	Category
2013–2016	Les Misérables	Marius Pontmercy	Queen's Theatre	West End
2016	Titanic	Frederick Fleet	Charing Cross Theatre	Off-West End
2017	Les Misérables	Performer	Imperial Theatre	Japan 30th Anniversary Gala
2018	Eugenius!	Eugene	The Other Palace	Off-West End
2019	The Light in the Piazza	Fabrizio Naccarelli	Royal Festival Hall Los Angeles Opera	Regional
2019	Les Misérables in Concert	Marius Pontmercy	Gielgud Theatre	West End
2020	City of Angels	Jimmy Powers/Dr. Mandril	Garrick Theatre	West End
2022	Stephen Sondheim's Old Friends: A Celebration	Performer	Sondheim Theatre	West End
2022	South Pacific	Lieutenant Joseph Cable	Manchester Opera House Sadler's Wells	Regional & UK tour
2024–2025	Titanique	Jack Dawson	Criterion Theatre	West End

=== Producer ===
Houchen is also known as a theatre producer and is the founder of Chorus Productions. In October 2024 he supported a charity concert of the musical I Am Harvey Milk at Cadogan Hall, based on the life of the queer politician, with profits going to Stonewall.
