= The Broken Wings =

1962 film

The Broken Wings is a 1962 film adaptation of the 1912 novel by Khalil Gibran. The film, directed by Youssef Maalouf, faithfully follows its source material in the bittersweet story of a young man's doomed love for a beautiful girl, who is forced by her parents to wed another man.

The Broken Wings was the first film produced in Lebanon to receive an international commercial release. Prints of the film were believed to have been destroyed when Beirut was caught up in the destructive chaos of the Lebanese civil war. However, a print was located after the war in an abandoned church outside of Beirut, and the film can still be seen in film festivals and on DVD.
