= The Band's Visit (musical) =

Musical

The Band’s Visit
- Broadway Promotional Poster
- Music: David Yazbek
- Lyrics: David Yazbek
- Book: Itamar Moses
- Setting: Negev, 1996
- Basis: The Band's Visit by Eran Kolirin
- Premiere: November 11, 2016: Linda Gross Theater
- Productions: 2016 Off-Broadway; 2017 Broadway; 2019 North American Tour; 2022 London
- Awards: Tony Award for Best Musical; Tony Award for Best Book of a Musical; Tony Award for Best Original Score; Grammy Award for Best Musical Theater Album

The Band's Visit is a stage musical with music and lyrics by David Yazbek and a book by Itamar Moses, based on the 2007 Israeli film of the same name. The musical opened on Broadway at the Ethel Barrymore Theatre in November 2017, after its off-Broadway premiere at the Atlantic Theater Company in December 2016.

The Band's Visit has received critical acclaim. Its off-Broadway production won several major awards, including the 2017 Obie Award for Musical Theatre, as well the year's New York Drama Critics' Circle Award for Best Musical. At the 72nd Tony Awards, it was nominated for 11 awards and won 10, including Best Musical. The Band's Visit is one of four musicals in Broadway history to win the unofficial "Big Six" Tony Awards, which include Best Musical, Best Book, Best Score, Best Actor in a Musical, Best Actress in a Musical, and Best Direction of a Musical. It won the 2019 Grammy Award for Best Musical Theater Album.

== Production History ==
=== Off-Broadway (2016-2017) ===
The original production premiered in Off-Broadway previews at the Atlantic Theater Company on November 11, 2016, had its official opening on December 8, 2016, and closed on January 8, 2017. The musical was developed and produced with support from the National Endowment for the Arts, the Laurents/Hatcher Foundation, and the National Alliance for Musical Theatre's National Fund for New Musicals. Harold Prince was slated to direct but withdrew due to scheduling conflicts. He was replaced by David Cromer, with choreography by Patrick McCollum, movement by Lee Sher, and starring Tony Shalhoub, Katrina Lenk, and John Cariani.

=== Broadway (2017-2019) ===
The musical began previews on Broadway on October 7, 2017, at the Ethel Barrymore Theatre prior to an official opening on November 9, 2017. On September 10, 2018, the producers announced that it had recouped its $8.75 million capitalization cost. The Broadway production closed on April 7, 2019 after 589 regular and 36 preview performances.

=== US National Tour (2019-2023) ===
The musical began its first national tour at the Providence Performing Arts Center in Providence, Rhode Island on June 25, 2019. The tour had 27 stops across North America. The tour concluded in June 2023.

=== London (2022) ===
The musical had its European premiere at the Donmar Warehouse in London directed by artistic director Michael Longhurst from 28 September to 3 December 2022.

=== Winnipeg (2025) ===
In 2025, *The Band’s Visit* was produced in Winnipeg by Winnipeg Jewish Theatre, marking the first Canadian production of the musical. Directed by Dan Petrenko, the artistic director of Winnipeg Jewish Theatre, the production featured the first Canadian cast of the show. Israeli actor Anat Kriger starred as Dina, with Omar Alex Khan appearing as Tewfiq.

=== Tel Aviv (2026) ===
On September 1, 2025, it was announced that the original Cromer-directed production would play a limited run in Tel Aviv, performances scheduled to begin on January 8, 2026. It was also announced that actors Sasson Gabai and Miri Mesika are scheduled to reprise their roles as Tewfiq and Dina which they've previously played on Broadway and in London (respectively). The show is set to perform at Shlomo Arena in Tel Aviv.

== Synopsis ==
The Band’s Visit opens with a message on a projector screen that displays during the overture, reading: "Once, not long ago, a group of musicians came to Israel from Egypt. You probably didn’t hear about it. It wasn’t very important."

In 1996, the Alexandria Ceremonial Police Orchestra, just arrived in Israel, are waiting in Tel Aviv's central bus station. They expect to be welcomed by a representative from a local Arab cultural organization, but no one shows up. The group's leader and conductor, the reserved and dignified Colonel Tewfiq Zakaria, gets annoyed with the behavior of Haled (the young trumpet player and ladies’ man of the band). He explains to the band that they will act with professionalism and avoid any embarrassments, lest they give their critics and sponsors ammunition against them. Tewfiq decides that the group will take the bus and instructs Haled to purchase the group's bus tickets. At the ticket office, Haled asks the clerk for a ticket to the city of Petah Tikvah, but due to his Egyptian accent, she misunderstands him and sells him tickets to the isolated desert town of "Bet Hatikvah".

The scene shifts to Bet Hatikvah, where the residents bemoan the boring and monotonous lives they lead in the desert ("Waiting"). When the band arrives in Bet Hatikvah to blank stares, they approach two café workers, Papi and Itzik, to ask for directions to the Arab Culture Center for their performance the next day. Unsure who these men are and what they're asking about, they call for the café's owner, a charismatic woman named Dina. Tewfiq again asks for directions to the Culture Center before Dina realizes that they think this is Petah Tikvah, and explains that this is the wrong place, and they must have taken the wrong bus ("Welcome to Nowhere"). Tewfiq gives Haled an earful for the humiliation he has caused them, then asks Dina if the band can dine at the café on what little Israeli money they have left. As the rest of the band eats, the band’s assistant conductor and clarinetist, Simon, plays his original concerto (which he never finished). Dina returns and tells the group that the next bus does not arrive until the following day. After Camal, the band’s violinist, suggests contacting the Egyptian embassy, Dina begins to understand how much of a tight spot the band is in. She offers to have her, Papi, and Itzik house them for the night; Tewfiq is hesitant, but seeing no other option, he agrees.

Dina brings Tewfiq and Haled back to her apartment for a place to sleep. In her kitchen, Dina inquires about Alexandria and muses that the big city must make you feel like you’re alive. Haled asks her why she stays in Bet Hatikvah if she wants more out of life, and Dina tells how she was once married and naïve, but nothing panned out the way she ideally hoped ("It Is What It Is"). She asks Tewfiq if he has a wife back in Egypt, and he responds that he did at one time but not anymore, leading Dina to believe that they are in the same boat. Dina then draws their attention to the only pay phone in town, which is guarded over every night by a man (known only as the "Telephone Guy") who obsessively waits for his girlfriend to call him, even though it has been a month. Dina convinces Tewfiq to let her show him around the town and buy him dinner, and Haled chooses to stay behind and let them enjoy each other’s company.

Meanwhile, Itzik allows Simon and Camal to stay with him and his family, consisting of his wife Iris and their baby, as well as his father-in-law, Avrum, who is visiting for the night. Itzik and Iris sit in awkward silence at the dinner table; Itzik tells the officers that it is his wife’s birthday today, while Iris silently fumes. When asked about his café job, Itzik responds that he is in between jobs, and Iris bluntly states that her job is to "care for invalids". Avrum tells his guests that he is a musician as well, and despite Iris’s protests brings up how he met her mother that way. Camal asks what happened to Avrum's wife, and Avrum replies that she died last year. Simon rebukes Camal for his prying, but Avrum insists that it is healthy for him to talk about it. He tells the story of how he met his wife many years ago at a club, and remembers how music had been the foundation for their entire relationship ("The Beat of Your Heart"). Itzik, Simon, and Camal are touched by the story, but Iris continues to eat silently, avoiding all interaction as her father reminisces.

As Dina and Tewfiq prepare to head out, Camal uses the pay phone to call the Egyptian embassy as the Telephone Guy watches him aggressively. Papi lets the rest of the band sleep in the café while he goes out; he has been invited by his friend Zelger and Zelger’s girlfriend Anna on a double date with Anna’s cousin Julia, but has anxiety about going out with her. Against Papi’s wishes, Haled tags along. (Note: The unnamed band members on stage play “Soraya” during the interlude between scenes.) Dina and Tewfiq sit down for dinner at a nearby cafeteria and quickly become the center of attention among the locals. Dina tells Tewfiq to ignore them and asks him what style of music his band plays; he claims that they are a traditional orchestra that sticks to classical Arab music. Dina recalls her childhood, and how every week she would listen to music on Egyptian radio stations from the likes of Umm Kulthum and watch Egyptian movies starring Omar Sharif. Tewfiq quotes one of the movies in question and they bond over the shared memories ("Omar Sharif"). Just then, Dina’s ex-lover Sammy enters with his family; it is implied that Dina is still having an affair with him. After an awkward greeting where Dina introduces Tewfiq, Sammy leaves with his family in a huff. Tewfiq suggests that it might be a good time for them to leave as well, but Dina decides to lighten the mood by putting on an Umm Kulthum song and having Tewfiq repeat his Omar Sharif quote. (Note: The unnamed band members on stage play “Haj-Butrus” during the interlude between scenes.)

Back at Itzik and Iris’s apartment, Simon plays his concerto at Avrum and Itzik’s request. Itzik asks Simon why it was never completed, to which Simon replies that his life got too busy after he started it. Itzik relates to Simon’s writer’s block with a story about how as a child he missed his own birthday because he had climbed a tree, staying there all day because it was too relaxing to leave. Iris retorts that in actuality Itzik is afraid of growing up and is still hiding in his tree, and she grabs her coat and heads for the door. When Itzik tries to calm her down, Iris declares that she has fallen out of love with him, and storms outside.

At the roller skating rink, Haled watches from afar as Papi ignores Julia and clumsily skates on his own. Papi stops a security guard from harassing Haled outside the rink, and as Julia passes him again, Papi remarks that he could never get girls the way Haled can. Upon hearing this, Haled reveals to Papi his impending arranged marriage back at home; the reason behind his Casanova attitude. Papi in turn explains his romantic anxieties to Haled, specifically that he can’t stop hearing the sea when his nerves kick in ("Papi Hears the Ocean"). After accidentally causing Julia to slip on her skates and fall down, as well as subsequently getting chewed out by Anna, Papi is petrified yet again. Haled helps to boost Papi's confidence and encourages him to "walk into the sea", which leads to Papi and Julia finally embracing each other ("Haled's Song About Love").

After their dinner, Dina takes Tewfiq to "The Park", which is just a bench in the middle of Bet Hatikvah. She asks him what it is like to have an orchestra and play music for an audience. He initially has trouble describing it, but soon he begins to show her what it's like to be a conductor by allowing her to mimic his arm motions. The topic shifts and Tewfiq opens up about his late wife, who he mentions died three years ago. Dina persuades Tewfiq to sing her the song that he sang before his wife many years ago while she conducts ("Itgara’a"). Despite not being able to understand his Arabic lyrics, she remains mesmerized by him for reasons she cannot fully explain, and wonders if his visit to Bet Hatikvah was meant for her by fate ("Something Different"). Dina asks Tewfiq if he had any children with his wife, and Tewfiq tells her that they had a son together. Their conversation is interrupted when Sammy returns to chastise Dina for their interaction at dinner, causing his current wife to ask questions. Tewfiq breaks up their argument and defiantly implores Dina to forgive Sammy for his mistakes. Sammy warns Dina before exiting, and a fatigued Tewfiq demands to leave the park; Dina reluctantly agrees.

As Camal accompanies outside the scene, Itzik sings his son to sleep, lamenting that he never follows through with his plans but his patience is what gets him through life ("Itzik's Lullaby"). Simon is still concerned about Iris leaving, but Itzik tells him that this happens often and she always returns. Soon, she does, and their son begins to cry. Simon is able to soothe the infant by playing his incomplete concerto again, this time finally finishing it. Iris has a tearful reconciliation with Itzik; Avrum takes this as his cue to leave, and Simon says goodbye to him before going to bed.

The Egyptian embassy calls back about sending a bus and Camal responds, afterwards letting the Telephone Guy return to his post. Dina and Tewfiq approach her apartment, and Dina makes a romantic advance toward Tewfiq, telling him that she wants to live the love that their Arab songs and movies portray despite her fears and doubts. Tewfiq refuses, informing Dina that his wife died because of him. He goes on to clarify that he never understood his son and was unnecessarily harsh with him, leading his son to take his own life, breaking his wife’s heart beyond repair. Haled returns, and they all enter the apartment in silence. Tewfiq and Haled share an uncharacteristic moment of bonding before Tewfiq heads off to bed without another word. Dina looks after him as he goes and solemnly contemplates the meaning of their relationship as Haled watches on ("Something Different (Reprise)"). Haled suavely compliments her eyes, and out of impulse Dina kisses him passionately.

Distraught, the Telephone Guy questions his devotion to his loved one as he continues to wait by the pay phone. He and the citizens of Bet Hatikvah long for the presence of a meaning to their lives as they anticipate the return to normalcy ("Answer Me"). Suddenly, just as the Telephone Guy gives up hope, the phone rings and he speaks to his girlfriend for the first time in weeks as Camal observes in contentment. The following morning, the band gathers by Dina's café as they prepare to board their bus. Dina hands Tewfiq a piece of paper with "Petah Tikvah" written on it to ensure he doesn't forget where he’s headed. Once they are gone and Dina is alone, she reiterates the message from the beginning to the audience: "Once, not long ago, a group of musicians came to Israel from Egypt. You probably didn’t hear about it. It wasn’t very important."

Later that day, the band makes it to Petah Tikvah's Arab Culture Center. Once they are in their places, Tewfiq begins to conduct, and the stage goes black. (Note: The band returns after the curtain call to play “The Concert”.)

== Off-Broadway versus Broadway productions ==
In addition to numerous script tweaks, the musical arrangements for several songs were updated for the Broadway production. "Itzik's Lullaby", for example, was changed from a solo piece to a partial duet with Camal singing in Arabic.

== Musical numbers ==
Based on the tracklist from the cast recording released on December 15, 2017

- "Overture" – The Band
- "Waiting" – The Residents of Bet Hatikva
- "Welcome to Nowhere" – Dina, Itzik, Papi
- "It Is What It Is" – Dina
- "Beat Of Your Heart" – Avrum, Itzik, Simon, Camal
- "Soraya" – The Band (added for Broadway, replacing "Aziza")
- "Omar Sharif" – Dina
- "Haj-Butrus" – The Band
- "Papi Hears the Ocean" – Papi
- "Haled's Song About Love" – Haled, Papi
- "The Park" (Dialogue Track) – Dina, Tewfiq
- "Itgara'a" – Tewfiq
- "Something Different" – Dina, Tewfiq
- "Itzik's Lullaby" – Itzik and Camal (Camal added for Broadway)
- "Something Different" (Reprise) – Dina
- "Answer Me" – Telephone Guy and Ensemble
- "The Concert" – The Band

In addition, Boney M.'s cover of "Sunny" is heard in the roller rink, and Rodgers and Hart's "My Funny Valentine" is performed by Haled on the trumpet in the style of Chet Baker.

== Characters and original casts ==
Character	Off-Broadway	Broadway	U.S. National Tour	London	Winnipeg	Tel Aviv
Character	2016	2017	2019	2022	2025	2026
Dina	Katrina Lenk	Katrina Lenk	Chilina Kennedy	Miri Mesika	Anat Kriger	Miri Mesika
Tewfiq	Tony Shalhoub	Tony Shalhoub	Sasson Gabai	Alon Aboutboul	Omar Alex Khan	Sasson Gabai
Haled	Ari'el Stachel	Ari'el Stachel	Joe Joseph	Sharif Afifi	Ryan Abd’u’lla Hooper	Amir Khoury
Simon	Alok Tewari	Alok Tewari	James Rana	Sargon Yelda	Majd Sukar	Khalifa Natour
Camal	George Abud	George Abud	Ronnie Malley	Carlos Mendoza de Hevia	Kamal Chioua	Samir Shukry
Itzik	John Cariani	John Cariani	Pomme Koch	Marc Antolin	Josh Bellan	Eviatar Bar-David
Papi	Daniel David Stewart	Etai Benson	Adam Gabai	Harel Glazer	Elliot Lazar	Adam Gabai
Telephone Guy	Erik Liberman	Adam Kantor	Mike Cefalo	Ashley Margolis	Seth Zosky	Shir Sayag
Iris	Kristen Sieh	Kristen Sieh	Kendal Hartse	Michal Horowicz	Shaina Silver-Baird	Dorin Kario
Avrum	Andrew Polk	Andrew Polk	David Studwell	Peter Polycarpou	Kevin McIntyre	Saar Badishi
Zelger	Bill Army	Bill Army	Or Schraiber	Levi Goldmeier	Duncan Cox	Ohad Lalo
Anna	Sharone Sayegh	Sharone Sayegh	Jennifer Apple	Yali Topol Margalith	Julia Kroft	Seymour Daniel
Julia	Rachel Prather	Rachel Prather	Sarah Kapner	Maya Kristal Tenenbaum	Grace Budoloski	Ligal Kaduri
Sammy	Jonathan Raviv	Jonathan Raviv	Marc Ginsburg	Ido Gonen	David Sklar	Gil Ari Cohen

== Critical response ==
In the review of the Off-Broadway production, the Huffington Post called the musical "exquisite", noting that Itamar Moses and David Yazbek have "created a small, touching show... [with] character depth and strong sense of place." The New York Times praised the cast, noting, "There’s not a performance, or a sung note, that feels out of key here... When the ensemble, led by Mr. Liberman, delivers the show’s final number, 'Answer Me,' the music takes on a transcendent harmonic shimmer that stops the heart."

According to Forbes, by October 2017, the Broadway show was "making a great impression" with critics with its first seven performances. The Broadway production, which featured a revised script and score, was praised by the Twin Cities Arts Reader as "one of the best new musicals of the year, gifted with a beautiful score and touching performances." The New York Times said it was "one of the most ravishing musicals you will ever be seduced by," and also "a Broadway rarity seldom found these days outside of the canon of Stephen Sondheim: an honest-to-God musical for grown-ups." It also praised the adaptation for the bigger stage, due to an "impeccably coordinated creative team." Deadline also gave the musical a positive review. The review's only criticism was that seating at a far distance in the new theater made the sound somewhat muddled and sight lines limited.

The Chicago Tribune gave the "weird new Broadway musical" a very positive review and said it was a "remarkable and boundlessly compassionate and humanistic piece of theater." Tablet Magazine thought it was "terrific." Entertainment Weekly also reviewed The Band's Visit positively, praising Katrina Lenk's portrayal of the cafe owner Dina as "dazzling." It gave the production an A−, and said it is "understated, probably better described as charming than life-altering, but its scale reinforces the moral themes of the musical itself." The Washington Post observed that "producers unaffiliated with the show say they are heartened by its run," as the "almost minimalist" production was doing well despite not having what seemed to be "a lot of overt commercial potential."

== Representation ==
The show has had a positive impact on Middle-Eastern actors and audiences, as many feel represented by the authentic characters that are not negative stereotypes. Ari’el Stachel, who plays Haled, acknowledges this in his speech after winning the Tony Award for Best Featured Actor in a Musical: "For so many years of my life I pretended I was not a Middle Eastern person. […] I am part of a cast of actors who never believed that they'd be able to portray their own races and we are doing that. And not only that but we're getting messages from kids all over the Middle East thanking us and telling us how transformative our representation is for them. […] I want any kid that's watching to know that your biggest obstacle may turn into your purpose."

== Awards and honors ==
=== Original Off-Broadway production ===
Year	Award Ceremony	Category	Nominee	Result
2017
2017	Drama Desk Awards	Outstanding Book of a Musical	Itamar Moses	Nominated
2017	Drama Desk Awards	Outstanding Director of a Musical	David Cromer	Won
2017	Drama Desk Awards	Outstanding Featured Actor in a Musical	Ari'el Stachel	Nominated
2017	Drama Desk Awards	Outstanding Lyrics	David Yazbek	Won
2017	Drama Desk Awards	Outstanding Music	David Yazbek	Won
2017	Drama Desk Awards	Outstanding Musical		Nominated
2017	Drama Desk Awards	Outstanding Orchestrations	Jamshied Sharifi	Nominated
2017	Lucille Lortel Awards	Outstanding Lead Actress in a Musical	Katrina Lenk	Won
2017	Lucille Lortel Awards	Outstanding Costume Design	Sarah Laux	Nominated
2017	Lucille Lortel Awards	Outstanding Featured Actor in a Musical	Ari’el Stachel	Nominated
2017	Lucille Lortel Awards	Outstanding Musical		Won
2017	New York Drama Critics' Circle Award	Best Musical	Itamar Moses and David Yazbek	Won
2017	Outer Critics Circle Awards	Outstanding Actor in a Musical	Tony Shalhoub	Nominated
2017	Outer Critics Circle Awards	Outstanding Actress in a Musical	Katrina Lenk	Nominated
2017	Outer Critics Circle Awards	Outstanding Book of a Musical (Broadway or Off-Broadway)	Itamar Moses	Nominated
2017	Outer Critics Circle Awards	Outstanding Director of a Musical	David Cromer	Nominated
2017	Outer Critics Circle Awards	Outstanding New Off-Broadway Musical		Won
2017	Outer Critics Circle Awards	Outstanding New Score (Broadway or Off-Broadway)	David Yazbek	Won
2017	Outer Critics Circle Awards	Outstanding Orchestrations (Broadway or Off-Broadway)	Jamshied Sharifi	Nominated
2017	Theatre World Award	Dorothy Loudon Award for Excellence in the Theater	Katrina Lenk	Won
2017	Off-Broadway Alliance Awards	Outstanding Musical		Nominated
2017	Obie Award	Obie Award for Musical Theatre	Itamar Moses (book) and David Yazbek (music & lyrics)	Won
2017	Obie Award	Obie Award for Directing	David Cromer	Won

=== Original Broadway production ===
Year	Award	Category	Nominee	Result
2018	Tony Award	Best Musical		Won
2018	Tony Award	Best Book of a Musical	Itamar Moses	Won
2018	Tony Award	Best Original Score	David Yazbek	Won
2018	Tony Award	Best Actor in a Musical	Tony Shalhoub	Won
2018	Tony Award	Best Actress in a Musical	Katrina Lenk	Won
2018	Tony Award	Best Featured Actor in a Musical	Ari'el Stachel	Won
2018	Tony Award	Best Scenic Design in a Musical	Scott Pask	Nominated
2018	Tony Award	Best Lighting Design in a Musical	Tyler Micoleau	Won
2018	Tony Award	Best Sound Design in a Musical	Kai Harada	Won
2018	Tony Award	Best Direction of a Musical	David Cromer	Won
2018	Tony Award	Best Orchestrations	Jamshied Sharifi	Won
2018	Drama League Award	Outstanding Production of a Broadway or Off-Broadway Musical		Won
2018	Drama League Award	Distinguished Performance Award	Katrina Lenk	Nominated
2018	Drama League Award	Distinguished Performance Award	Tony Shalhoub	Nominated
2018	Drama Desk Award	Outstanding Sound Design in a Musical	Kai Harada	Won
2019	Grammy Award	Best Musical Theater Album		Won
2019	Daytime Emmy Award	Outstanding Musical Performance in a Daytime Program	The Cast of The Band's Visit on Today	Won

=== Original London production ===
Year	Award	Category	Nominee	Result
2023	Laurence Olivier Awards	Best New Musical		Nominated
2023	Laurence Olivier Awards	Best Actor in a Musical	Alon Moni Aboutboul	Nominated
2023	Laurence Olivier Awards	Best Actress in a Musical	Miri Mesika	Nominated
2023	Laurence Olivier Awards	Best Actor in a Supporting Role in a Musical	Sharif Afifi	Nominated
2023	Laurence Olivier Awards	Best Actor in a Supporting Role in a Musical	Peter Polycarpou	Nominated
2023	Laurence Olivier Awards	Best Original Score or New Orchestrations	Andrea Grody, Jamshied Sharifi and David Yazbek	Nominated

== Recording ==
An original Broadway cast recording was released on December 15, 2017 through Sh-K-Boom Records. It peaked at number 62 on the Top Current Album Sales chart and number three on the Cast Albums chart.
