= Hope Mill Theatre =

Theatre in Manchester, England

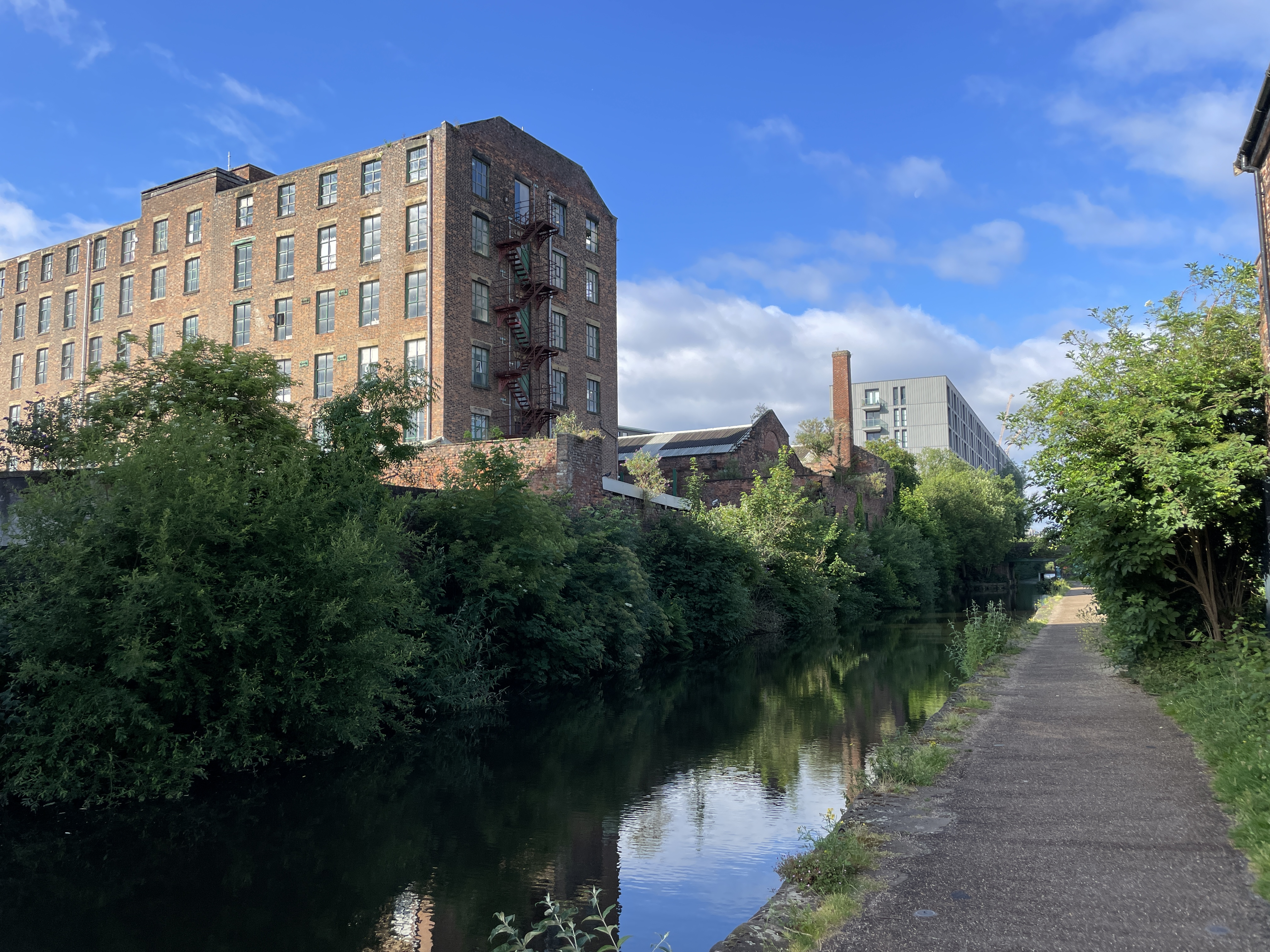
- Interactive map of Hope Mill Theatre
- Address: 113 Pollard St, M4 7JA; Manchester; England
- Coordinates: 53.483275°N 2.216334°W
- Operator: The Factory of Creativity

Construction
- Opened: November 2015

Website
- hopemilltheatre.co.uk

The Hope Mill Theatre is an independent theatre in Ancoats, Manchester, England that performs original and revival plays, musicals and other events. The theatre is located in the Hope Mill building, a Grade II* listed converted textile mill. It won Fringe Venue of The Year at The Stage awards in 2018. Hope Mill Theatre is the main work of the registered charity A Factory of Creativity.

== History ==
Joseph Houston and William Whelton built on their training in London theatre to create a theatre modelled on the Off West End Theatres which dominate the London theatre scene. They created a small producing venue in Manchester and opened Hope Mill Theatre in November, 2015.

Whelton and Houston serve as respectively Executive and Artistic director of the theatre. In 2016 they won the Hospital Club Award for their contribution in Theatre and Performance and in 2017 they were also awarded a Special Achievement Award at the Manchester Theatre Awards.

Katy Lipson, founder of Aria Entertainment, was the artistic director at the Hope Mill for several years, also producing many of the show staged at the venue, from Rags to Mame.

The Hope Mill Theatre is now a registered charity, under the name "A Factory of Creativity", but continues being called with its original name. Whelton and Houston remain in their directors' roles and a board of trustees has also been appointed, to help support and guide the charity.

Since 2020 the venue also hosts the "Turn on Fest", a LGBTQIA+ theatre festival, every year for two weeks, with live performances. The festival is usually run in collaboration with Superbia, Manchester Pride’s year-round programme of arts and culture. Every year the festival showcases different work and local queer theatre companies (in 2021 the full programme was held online).

- In 2020 - Qweerdog Theatre presented ‘Absolute Certainty?’, revived for the festival after performing at the Great Manchester Fringe.
- In 2021 - the festival was held online and events were mostly discussions with various artists, including Divina De Campo.
- 2022 - "The Regulars", a musical produced and developed by Hope Mill Theatre in collaboration with Trans Creative
- 2023 - headline event was "A Conversation with Jill Nalder: Actor, Activist, Author and inspiration behind Russell t Davies’ critically acclaimed drama It’s a Sin".

== Values ==
The mission of the Hope Mill Theatre is to "enrich, educate and entertain the community by providing a uniquely superior theatre experience; allowing both audiences and artists alike to be inspired, ambitious and to share stories and enlighten lives through the power of theatre."

== Hope Mill team ==
The Hope Mill Theatre is supported by volunteers who cover both front of house and back of house roles in the venue. Front of house volunteers welcome guests, check tickets and show ticket holders to their seats.

The venue also hosts yearly work experience high school and university students who are looking to pursue a career in the arts.

== Production history ==
Notable productions at the theater
Opening year	Name	Refs.
2016	Parade	
2016	Hair, 50th Anniversary	
2017	YANK!	
2017	Pippin	
2017	Little Women	
2018	The ToyBoy Diaries	
2018	Spring Awakening	
2018	Closets	
2018	Aspects of Love	
2018	Putting It Together	
2018	The Return of the Soldier	
2019	Club Mex	
2019	Rags	
2019	Mame	
2019	Mame	
2019	The Astonishing Times of Timothy Cratchit	
2020	Zorro: The Musical	
2020	Godspell: 50th Anniversary Concert (online)	
2020	RENT (2020, closed due to COVID-19, August 2021)	
2021	The Wiz	
2022	Passion	
2022	Rodgers and Hammerstein's Cinderella	
2023	Head over Heels	
2023	To Wong Foo: The Musical	
2023	LIZZIE	
2024	Gypsy: In Concert (at the Opera House)	
2024	The Gap	
2024	A Christmas Carol (at The Quays Theatre)	
2025	Glorius!	
2025	Young Frankenstein	
2026	Little Shop of Horrors	

== Awards ==
Year	Award	Category	Result	Ref
2016	The Hospital Club Awards	Theatre and Performance	Won	
2017	Manchester Theatre Awards	Special Achievement	Won	
2017	Manchester Theatre Awards	Best Fringe Production (for Moth)	Won	
2017	Peter Brook Award	Empty Space Peter Brook Award	Nominated	
2017	The Stage Awards	Fringe Theatre of the Year	Nominated	
2018	The Stage Awards	Fringe Theatre of the Year	Won	
2023	Whatsonstage Awards	Best Regional Production, for To Wong Foo The Musical	Nominated	
