= Bruce Sabath =

American actor

Bruce Sabath is an American actor, known for his work in live-performance theater. He made his Broadway debut playing Larry in the 2006 Tony Award-winning revival of Stephen Sondheim's hit musical Company.

His transition from a career on Wall Street to working on Broadway was cited by The Wall Street Journal as an example of Sequential Multiple Careers.

== Early life and education ==
Bruce Sabath was born and raised in Rochester, New York, the son of Martin Cherkas Sabath, a career engineer at Eastman Kodak Company, and Margie Guggenheim Sabath.

He attended Brighton High School in Rochester, where he was active as a musician, singer and actor. He graduated as class valedictorian in 1980. He was also a songleader in the National Federation of Temple Youth.

While an undergraduate at Harvard University, Sabath was an early member of the a cappella group the Harvard Din & Tonics. In his senior year, he played Tevye in a college production of Fiddler on the Roof. Later on, while enrolled in an MBA program at the Wharton School, he was featured in the Wharton Follies.

== Business career ==
Beginning in the mid-1980s, Sabath worked for Arthur Andersen, First Boston, the Boston Consulting Group, and American Express.

== Acting career ==
In 1997, Sabath decided to leave his career on Wall Street and pursue acting. For the next two years, he studied acting at the Esper Studio, movement at Actors' Movement Studio, and voice with Joyce Hall. In 1999, he received his first professional acting job in the second national tour of Victor/Victoria.

=== Stage ===
In 2006, Sabath played Larry in the Broadway Revival of Company which won the Tony Award for Best Revival of a Musical. Other shows in which he has appeared are Frost/Nixon (playing Richard Nixon in the play's southeast premiere at the Caldwell Theatre in Florida); Moliere's The Imaginary Invalid at the Schoolhouse Theatre in New York; and Fiddler on the Roof at Stages St. Louis, for which, in the role of Tevye, he won the 2014 BroadwayWorld Award for best Actor in a Musical. He played movie mogul Jack L. Warner in the New York premiere of Cagney, first at the York Theatre (2015), then for over 500 performances at the Westside Theatre (2016–17). In 2018, he played Lazer Wolf in Fiddler on the Roof in Yiddish at the National Yiddish Theatre Folksbiene.

=== Television ===
Sabath's screen credits include appearances on The Blacklist (NBC), Elementary (CBS), Madam Secretary (CBS), FBI: Most Wanted (CBS), Limitless (CBS), Ramy (Hulu) and The Marvelous Mrs. Maisel (Prime).

== Activities ==
Sabath is active with Broadway Cares/Equity Fights AIDS (BCEFA). He co-chaired fundraising efforts of Fiddler on the Roof in Yiddish in their fall 2018 and spring 2019 fundraising campaigns, and in both cases, the show raised more than any other off-Broadway show.

== Personal life ==
Sabath and his wife Karen, a former managing director at BlackRock, live in Westchester County, New York. Their son Mike Sabath is a record producer and songwriter.
