= Harvard Din & Tonics =

Harvard University a cappella group

The Harvard Din & Tonics (informally The Dins) are a five-part jazz a cappella group from Harvard University, founded in 1979.

== History ==
The group was founded in April 1979 as a public service project of the Phillips Brooks House Association at Harvard College in Cambridge, Massachusetts, performing for the university community and local charitable organizations. Their repertoire was derived in part from the Dunster Dunces, an earlier Harvard a cappella group that was active from 1946 until 1968. Their first public concert was at Yale University in November 1979, amidst the pageantry of the Harvard-Yale football game.

The group performed in their first film in 1982, entitled First Affair and starring Melissa Sue Anderson and Loretta Swit. They also appeared in the movie Mona Lisa Smile, a 2003 film starring Julia Roberts that was set at Wellesley College.

Previously an all-male ensemble, the group admitted its first female member in 2018, and a second in 2019.

== Name origin ==
The name Din & Tonics is a pun on the popular drink the gin and tonic, and the words din, meaning a loud noise, and tonic, a musical term meaning the first note of a musical scale. The lime green socks worn by the group's members are said to represent the lime that is traditionally served with the gin and tonic, hence the group's slogan, "A cappella with a twist."

== Repertoire and performances ==
The Dins, generally comprising 12 to 15 undergraduate students, are an entirely self-directed group. Most of their arrangements are written by current or former members. Their repertoire consists primarily of jazz standards from the Great American Songbook, as well as humor songs drawn from various periods and styles. Their repertoire also extends at times to numerous other genres, including folk, rock, calypso, spiritual, and pop. They regularly perform in white tie, tails, and their signature lime green socks.

The Din and Tonics began performing their own arrangement of "Sh-Boom" (generally regarded as the first popular doo-wop song after it became a #1 hit on the Billboard charts in 1954) in 1979. It has served as the Dins' signature song, and they have performed it at almost every concert since. "Sh-Boom" is featured on fourteen of the group's fifteen albums. Due to the frequency of the song, the Din and Tonics will often invite Din and Tonic alumni to get on stage and perform along with the current members when performing at Harvard.

The Dins have appeared on television shows, including The Price Is Right and Good Morning America, and have performed the "Star Spangled Banner" for the San Francisco Giants, the Tampa Bay Lightning, the Los Angeles Lakers, the PGA's Ryder Cup, the Boston Red Sox and the New York Yankees, the Boston Celtics, the Boston Bruins, and the Boston Breakers.

== Traveling and tours ==
The Dins have performed overseas since the founding of the group, and began touring Asia regularly in the late 1980s. Since 1990, the Dins have gone on world tours biennially. Each tour is between 2 and 3 months long and includes performances in roughly 15 countries in Europe, Africa, Asia, Australia, North America and South America. Additionally, they travel regularly to Vail, Colorado, Washington, D.C., New York City and spend spring break performing in Bermuda or Whistler, BC.

The Dins have toured in Australia, Austria, Belgium, Brazil, Canada, China, Cyprus, the Czech Republic, Denmark, Egypt, Fiji, France, Germany, Greece, Hong Kong, Hungary, Iceland, India, Indonesia, Ireland, Italy, Japan, Jordan, Kenya, Luxembourg, Malaysia, Mexico, Morocco, Nepal, the Netherlands, Norway, the Philippines, Serbia, Singapore, Slovenia, South Korea, Sweden, Switzerland, Thailand, the United Kingdom, and the Vatican City.

While on tour in 2010, the Dins performed at the closing ceremonies for the Shanghai Expo music festival.

In January 2017, the Dins performed the National Anthem for the Los Angeles Lakers at the Staples Center in Los Angeles, following a performance with the Harvard Krokodiloes for the Harvard Club of Southern California.

== Notable collaborations and performances ==
The Dins have performed for jazz vocalists Ella Fitzgerald and Bobby McFerrin, for members of the New York Voices, singer Lionel Richie, jazz pianist Herbie Hancock, jazz trumpeter Wynton Marsalis, former governor and professional wrestler Jesse Ventura, actresses Julia Roberts, Kristin Chenoweth, Sharon Stone, Jessica Lange, Kathie Lee Gifford, and Kathleen Turner, television host Conan O'Brien, actor Andy Garcia, comedian Jackie Mason, Maestro Keith Lockhart of the Boston Pops, cellist Yo-Yo Ma, Caroline Kennedy, former U.S. President Bill Clinton, as well as the Governor of Bermuda and the U.S. ambassadors to Australia, Germany, Greece, Nepal, Ireland, Morocco, Norway, Italy and Belgium.

During their world tour, the Dins have recently performed with the award-winning German vocal quintet Vocaldente and Icelandic vocalist Andrea Gylfadóttir.

More recently, the Dins performed for John Williams and the assembled graduates at Harvard's 366th Commencement to celebrate his career. The group performed an original medley of his most notable songs, ranging from Jaws to Star Wars and Indiana Jones.

They have appeared in the films Mona Lisa Smile and First Affair.

== Notable alumni ==
- Jonathan Aibel, writer of Kung Fu Panda, Kung Fu Panda 2, and Kung Fu Panda 3
- Tom Campbell, executive vice president of development at World of Wonder Productions
- John Duda, film actor
- Peter Feaver, American professor of political science and public policy at Duke University, special advisor for strategic planning and institutional reform on the National Security Council during the George W. Bush administration and director for defense policy and arms control at the National Security Council during the Clinton administration
- Dan Koh, former deputy director of the White House Office of Intergovernmental Affairs
- Hoon Lee, stage and screen actor
- Robert S. Rivkin, senior vice president for regulatory and international affairs and deputy general counsel of Delta Air Lines
- Bruce Sabath, Broadway actor (Company, Cagney, The Girlfriend)
- Patrick Whelan, first music director of the Dins, lecturer in pediatrics at Harvard Medical School, pediatric rheumatologist at UCLA, president of the Los Angeles Pediatric Society, founder of Catholic Democrats
- Samuel Wong, acting conductor of the New York Philharmonic, and later music director of the Ann Arbor Symphony Orchestra, the Hawaii Symphony, and the Hong Kong Philharmonic Orchestra

== Discography ==
The Din and Tonics have produced 19 albums thus far:

- In the Beginning (1983)
- With a Twist (1985)
- Dins at 10 (1988)
- In the Limelight (1990)
- Tonic Boom (1992)
- Sublime (1994)
- Toast of the Town (1996)
- Platonic (1998)
- Freshly Squeezed (2000)
- The Green Album (2002)
- Dinbound (2004)
- Hint of Lime (2008)
- The Pursuit of Snappiness (2010) — This album features an original song for the Dins written by composer Nathaniel Stookey and lyricist Daniel Handler (author of A Series of Unfortunate Events under the pen name Lemony Snicket)
- Rhapsody in Green (2012)
- Easy Being Green (2014)
- The Dark Side of the Lime (2016)
- Citric (2018)
- It’s About Lime (2022)
- Zest (2024)

== Current members ==
The group currently has 14 members:

- Khang Nguyen '27 (President)
- Kieran Chung '27 (Music Director)
- Alex Gayle '27 (Business Manager)
- Ria Cuéllar-Koh '26 (Producer)
- Shannon Harrington '26
- Christopher Schwarting '28
- Allegra Isdar GSE '26
- Cassidy Crabb '28 (Co-Tour Manager)
- Soren Cowell-Shah '27
- Will Cottiss '28 (Co-Tour Manager)
- Kalashree Vyas '29 (Assistant Music Director)
- Mark Snekvik '29 (Assistant Music Director)
- Kiesse Nanor ‘26
- Ben Arthurs ‘27
