= Jason Forbach =

American actor and singer

- Born: Jason Thomas Forbach; 1978 or 1979 (age 47–48)
- Education: University of Missouri (BM); New England Conservatory (MA)
- Occupations: Actor, singer, playwright, filmmaker
- Years active: 2006–present
- Known for: Into the Woods; Les Misérables; The Phantom of the Opera
- Spouse: Joseph Spieldenner (m. 2016)

Jason Thomas Forbach (born c. 1978/1979) is an American actor, singer, playwright and filmmaker. He is known for his Broadway portrayals of Rapunzel's Prince and the Baker in Into the Woods, Enjolras in Les Misérables, and Raoul in The Phantom of the Opera.

== Early life ==
Forbach graduated with his Bachelor of Music in 2000 from University of Missouri where he was the recipient of the Chancellor's Emerging Artist Award that year. He went on to complete his Masters with academic distinction at New England Conservatory in Boston.

== Career ==
In 2006, Forbach joined the Las Vegas cast of The Phantom of the Opera understudying the roles of Raoul and Monsieur Reyer.

In 2009, Forbach played the dual role of Rapunzel's Prince and The Wolf in Into the Woods at the Wells Fargo Pavilion.

In 2012, Forbach joined the 25th Anniversary national tour cast of Les Misérables as Feuilly and an understudy for Enjolras. He later took over the role of Enjolras playing opposite his real-life husband Joseph Spieldenner as Grantaire until the tour closed. In 2013, he received acclaim for his performance as Chris Scott in the North Shore Music Theatre production of Miss Saigon.

In March 2014, Forbach returned to Les Misérables in the second Broadway revival. Once again playing Feuilly and understudying Enjolras. He briefly took over the role of Enjolras again in October 2014 and left the role in November of that same year. He continued with the production playing Feuilly and the Factory Foreman.

Forbach appeared as Captain Albert Lennox in the 2016 and 2017 Shakespeare Theatre Company and 5th Avenue Theatre productions of The Secret Garden.

Forbach is also an award-winning playwright having placed in the 2019 New Works of Merit Playwriting Competition with his play Heathen Hill, which received an industry reading directed by Kevin Newbury with Dan Amboyer starring. In 2020, his one-hour period drama TV pilot Brooklyn Pansy was named a Grand Prize Winner in the WeScreenplay Spring 2020 Diverse Voices Screenwriting Lab.

In 2022, Forbach joined the New York City Center Encores! production of Into the Woods as the male swing. He would end up going on for Rapunzel's Prince for a majority of the run when Jordan Donica was sick. He moved with the production to the St. James Theatre for the second Broadway revival understudying the roles of the Baker, the Wolf/Cinderella's Prince, Rapunzel's Prince, and the Narrator/Mysterious Man. He opened the production as the Baker when Brian d'Arcy James was sick, and also went on for the Wolf/Cinderella's Prince many times including when Gavin Creel and Cheyenne Jackson were both unavailable for 3 days in August. He also played Rapunzel's Prince many times during the production's run on Broadway.

On November 21, 2022, Forbach returned to The Phantom of the Opera at the Majestic Theatre on Broadway for a limited run through December 5 playing the role of Raoul, Vicomte de Chagny. He had been a vacation swing in Phantom at the Majestic Theatre for several years, primarily understudying the roles of Raoul, Reyer, Marksman, and Hairdresser.

In 2023, Forbach went on tour across the United States to ten cities with the Broadway production of Into the Woods playing Rapunzel's Prince and understudying the Baker. He starred opposite Gavin Creel, Stephanie J. Block, Montego Glover, and Sebastian Arcelus all reprising their Broadway roles. On February 23, he went on for the Baker last second for the second act of the production's preview performance at the Kennedy Center in Washington D.C., he would then proceed to open the show's engagement as the Baker that weekend and play the role for the majority of the performances at the Kennedy Center while Arcelus was recovering from an injury. Andy Karl and understudies Sam Simahk and Eddie Lopez played Rapunzel's Prince in his place. On February 28, Forbach announced on his Instagram stories he'd be playing the Baker during the 6-day absence of Arcelus at the Emerson Colonial Theatre in Boston, Massachusetts. Simahk played Rapunzel's Prince in his place. He also played the Baker during the production's closing weekend at the Tennessee Performing Arts Center in Nashville, Tennessee with Lopez playing Rapunzel's Prince in his place.

In 2024, it was announced that Forbach will make his film directorial debut with the short thriller film The Delicate Medium from a screenplay he wrote. Production was originally set to begin in the summer of 2025, but was postponed to 2026.

Since Into the Woods, Forbach has joined the Broadway casts of A Wonderful World which opened in October 2024, and Ragtime opened in October 2025.

== Personal life ==
On February 9, 2016, he married actor Joseph Spieldenner.

== Filmography ==
=== Film ===
As a filmmaker
Year	Title	Role	Notes
TBA	The Delicate Medium	writer and director	Short film

=== Television ===
As an actor
Year(s)	Production	Role	Notes
2011	America's Got Talent	Feuilly	1 episode
2024	Law & Order: Special Victims Unit	Sam McKenzie	1 episode
2024	FBI: Most Wanted	Governor of Missouri	1 episode

=== Stage ===
Year(s)	Production	Role	Location	Notes
2006	The Music Teacher	Jim / Chronilos	Minetta Lane Theatre	Off-Broadway
2006–2009	The Phantom of the Opera	Ensemble; u/s Raoul, Vicomte de Chagny u/s Monsieur Reyer	The Venetian Las Vegas	The Las Vegas Spectacular
2006	A Christmas Carol	Dick Wilkins; u/s Narrator u/s The Ghost of Christmas Yet to Come / Young Scrooge	North Shore Music Theatre	Regional
2009	Into the Woods	The Wolf / Rapunzel's Prince	Wells Fargo Pavilion	Regional
2010–2012	Les Misérables	Feuilly; u/s Enjolras	U.S. National Tour	25th Anniversary
2012–2013	Les Misérables	Enjolras	U.S. National Tour; April 6, 2012 - June 9, 2013	25th Anniversary
2013	Miss Saigon	Chris Scott	North Shore Music Theatre	Regional
2014	Les Misérables	Enjolras	Saroyan Theater	Fresno Grand Opera
2014	Les Misérables	Enjolras	Imperial Theatre; October 28 – November 30	Broadway
2014–2015	Les Misérables	Feuilly; u/s Enjolras	Imperial Theatre; March 23 – October 26, 2014; December 9, 2014 – May 24, 2015; June 23–29, 2015; September 7 – December 21, 2015	Broadway
2015	My Fair Lady	Freddy Eynsford-Hill	Wells Fargo Pavilion	Regional
2015–2016	Les Misérables	Feuilly / Factory Foreman; u/s Enjolras	Imperial Theatre; June 30 – September 6, 2015; December 22, 2015 – September 4, 2016	Broadway
2016–2017	The Secret Garden	Captain Albert Lennox	Sidney Harman Hall	Shakespeare Theatre Company
2016–2017	The Secret Garden	Captain Albert Lennox	5th Avenue Theatre	Shakespeare Theatre Company
2017	Evita	Agustin Magaldi	Pennsylvania Shakespeare Festival	Regional
2017	The Secret Garden	Captain Albert Lennox	Sarofim Hall	Presented by Shakespeare Theatre Company / 5th Avenue Theatre
2018-2019	The Phantom of the Opera	Raoul, Vicomte de Chagny (Alternate)	Majestic Theatre; December 6–8, 2018; January 9–12, 2019; May 31 – June 1, 2019; June 15, 2019; July 6–7, 2019	Broadway
2018–2022	The Phantom of the Opera	Monsieur Reyer, Marksman, Hairdresser, Jeweler, Fireman, Porter, Passarino (Swing) u/s Raoul, Vicomte de Chagny	Majestic Theatre; February 5 – November 11, 2018; November 18 – December 5, 2018; December 9, 2018 – January 8, 2019; January 13 – May 30, 2019; June 2–14, 2019; June 16 – July 5, 2019; July 8 – August 4, 2019; August 11, 2019 – March 12, 2020; October 22, 2021 – May 3, 2022; May 16 – June 12, 2022	Broadway
2018–2022	The Phantom of the Opera	Raoul, Vicomte de Chagny	Majestic Theatre; November 12–17, 2018; August 5–10, 2019; November 21 – December 5, 2022	Broadway
2022	Into the Woods	The Baker, The Wolf / Cinderella's Prince, Jack, Rapunzel's Prince, The Narrator / The Mysterious Man (Swing)	New York City Center; May 4–15	Encores! Played Rapunzel's Prince for a majority of the run when Jordan Donica was sick
2022	Into the Woods	The Wolf / Cinderella's Prince	St. James Theatre; August 3–5	Broadway
2022–2023	Into the Woods	u/s The Baker u/s The Wolf / Cinderella's Prince u/s Rapunzel's Prince u/s The Narrator / The Mysterious Man	St. James Theatre; June 28 – August 2, 2022; August 6 – November 20, 2022; December 6, 2022 – January 8, 2023	Broadway
2023	Into the Woods	Rapunzel's Prince; u/s The Baker	U.S. National Tour; February 18–23; March 11–26; April 4 – May 25; June 6 – July 30	Ten city engagement
2023	Into the Woods	The Baker	U.S. National Tour; February 23 – March 11; March 28 – April 2 May 26–28	Ten city engagement
2023	The Rocky Horror Show	Brad Majors	Bucks County Playhouse	Regional
2024-2025	A Wonderful World	Crooner / White Gangster / Larry The Reporter u/s Joe Glaser	Studio 54	Broadway
2025	Cabaret	Clifford Bradshaw	Guthrie Theater	Regional
2025-2026	Ragtime	Henry Ford / Ensemble u/s The Father u/s The Mother's Younger Brother	Vivian Beaumont Theatre	Broadway

== See also ==
- LGBTQ culture in New York City
- List of LGBTQ people from New York City
