= Into the Woods =

1986 musical by Stephen Sondheim and James Lapine

- Original Broadway windowcard
- Music: Stephen Sondheim
- Lyrics: Stephen Sondheim
- Book: James Lapine
- Productions: 1986 San Diego; 1987 Broadway; 1988 US Tour; 1990 West End; 2002 Broadway revival; 2022 Broadway revival; 2023 US Tour; 2026 West End revival
- Awards: Tony Award for Best Original Score; Tony Award for Best Book of a Musical; Drama Desk Outstanding Musical; 2002 Tony Award for Best Revival; 2011 Olivier Award for Best Revival; 2026 Olivier Award for Best Revival

Into the Woods is a 1986 musical with music and lyrics by Stephen Sondheim and book by James Lapine. The musical intertwines the plots of several Brothers Grimm fairy tales, exploring the consequences of the characters' wishes and quests. The main characters are taken from "Little Red Riding Hood" (spelled "Ridinghood" in the published vocal score), "Jack and the Beanstalk", "Rapunzel", "Cinderella", and several others. The musical is tied together by a story involving a childless baker and his wife and their quest to begin a family (the original beginning of the Grimm Brothers' "Rapunzel"), their interaction with a witch who has placed a curse on them and encounters with other storybook characters during their journey.

The second collaboration between Sondheim and Lapine after Sunday in the Park with George (1984), Into the Woods debuted in San Diego at the Old Globe Theatre in 1986 and premiered on Broadway on November 5, 1987, where it won three major Tony Awards (Best Score, Best Book, and Best Actress in a Musical for Joanna Gleason), in a year dominated by The Phantom of the Opera. The musical has since been produced many times, including a 1988 U.S. national tour, a 1990 West End production, a 2002 Broadway revival, a 2010 outdoor Regent's Park Open Air Theatre production in London, which transferred to Shakespeare in the Park in New York City, a 2022 Broadway revival, and a 2026 West End revival.

A Disney film adaptation, directed by Rob Marshall, was released in 2014. The film grossed $213 million worldwide, and received three nominations at both the Academy Awards and the Golden Globe Awards.

== Synopsis ==
=== Act I ===
The Narrator introduces the main characters in the story. Cinderella wishes to attend a festival held by the king, but her Stepmother refuses. Jack wishes his cow, Milky White, would give milk, and his Mother wishes that Jack would sell Milky White. A Baker and his Wife wish to have a child, and Little Red Riding Hood wishes for bread to bring to her ill Grandmother. Little Red obtains bread from the Baker, who then is visited by a neighbor, an ugly old Witch. She reveals that the Baker and his Wife cannot have children because, when the Baker's father stole vegetables from her garden, she cursed his family tree to "be a barren one" and took the couple's other child, Rapunzel. If the Witch is brought four items – "the cow as white as milk, the cape as red as blood, the hair as yellow as corn, and the slipper as pure as gold" – in three days time, she will lift the curse. All begin their journey into the woods: Jack to sell Milky White, Cinderella to visit her mother's grave after her family left for the festival without her, Little Red to visit her Grandmother, and the Baker – refusing his wife's help – to find the ingredients ("Into the Woods").

Cinderella receives a gown and golden slippers from her mother's spirit ("Cinderella at the Grave"). A Mysterious Man mocks Jack for valuing his cow more than a "sack of beans". Little Red meets a hungry Wolf who intends to eat her ("Hello, Little Girl"), which The Baker sees, and notices her cape. His Wife follows him; they meet Jack and convince him to trade Milky White for beans found in the Baker's jacket after lying and saying they're magic. Jack bids a tearful goodbye to Milky White ("I Guess This Is Goodbye"). The Baker regrets lying, but his Wife reassures him ("Maybe They're Magic").

The Witch has raised Rapunzel in a tall tower accessible only by climbing Rapunzel's long, golden hair ("Our Little World"), and a Prince spies Rapunzel, falling in love. Little Red and her Grandmother are eaten by the Wolf, but the Baker, in pursuit of the cape, saves them and kills the wolf. To thank the Baker, Little Red gifts him the cape ("I Know Things Now"). Jack returns to his Mother with the beans, which she angrily throws on the ground. After attending the festival, Cinderella flees from a Prince who has fallen in love with her. She meets the Baker's Wife who helps her hide ("A Very Nice Prince"). The Baker's Wife tries to grab one of Cinderella's slippers, but loses Milky White. As the day ends, the characters recall their morals from the day ("First Midnight").

Jack describes his adventure climbing a beanstalk the beans sprouted and meeting a giant couple ("Giants in The Sky"). Having stolen money from the giants, he tries to buy Milky White back, though the Baker refuses. After Jack returns up the beanstalk to get more treasure, the Mysterious Man takes the money from the Baker. Cinderella and Rapunzel's Princes, who are brothers, compare their maidens ("Agony"). The Baker's Wife, hearing of a girl with golden hair, finds Rapunzel, fools her into letting down her hair, and plucks some strands. The Mysterious Man finds Milky White and returns her to the Baker, and the Baker's Wife again fails to take Cinderella's slippers. The Baker admits they must work together ("It Takes Two"). Jack arrives with a hen that lays golden eggs, but Milky White keels over dead as midnight chimes ("Second Midnight").

The Witch discovers the Prince's visits to Rapunzel and demands she stay sheltered from the world. Rapunzel refuses, and the Witch cuts off her hair and banishes her to a remote desert ("Stay with Me"). The Mysterious Man gives the Baker money to buy another cow. Jack meets Little Red, now sporting a cape made from the wolf skin, and she goads him into stealing more from the giants. Torn between staying with her Prince or escaping, Cinderella leaves him a slipper as a clue ("On the Steps of the Palace") and trades shoes with the Baker's Wife. The Baker buys a new cow, and the two find the Witch.

With a loud crash, Jack's Mother runs in crying over a dead giant in her backyard, but is brushed off by the group. The Witch discovers that the cow is not Milky White, but an ordinary cow covered with flour, but is able to resurrect Milky White. When no milk is produced, she is angered when discovering the hair is Rapunzel's. The Mysterious Man suggests using corn silk instead, which works. The Witch reveals the Mysterious Man is the Baker's father, and drinks the potion. The curse is broken, the Mysterious Man falls dead, and the Witch regains her youth and beauty.

Cinderella's Prince looks for Cinderella. Her Stepmother forces her stepsisters to mutilate their feet to fit in the shoe, then hesitantly brings Cinderella to put on the shoe. It fits perfectly, and the two are reunited ("Careful My Toe"). Rapunzel bears twins and finds her Prince in the desert. When Rapunzel refuses to return to her, the Witch finds her powers were lost when the curse was broken. At Cinderella's wedding to her Prince, the Baker's Wife thanks Cinderella for her help. As the cast celebrates living "happily ever after", nobody notices another beanstalk growing ("Ever After").

=== Act II ===
The narrator returns, reintroducing the cast, who have new wishes. The Baker's Wife wishes their house was bigger, but the Baker refuses to move out of his father's home. Jack misses the kingdom in the sky, and Cinderella is bored with her new life. With a loud crash, the Baker's house and the Witch's garden are destroyed ("So Happy"). The Baker goes to the castle to warn Cinderella, but is escorted out by the Steward. Little Red's house is also destroyed, and the Baker and his Wife offer to escort her to her Grandmother's home. Jack, hearing of the destruction from the Baker, goes to the woods to slay the giant, and Cinderella disguises herself to investigate the destruction of her mother's grave ("Into the Woods" (reprise)).

Rapunzel, driven mad by her long confinement, also flees to the woods. Her Prince follows her and meets his brother, and the two confess their lust for new women, Snow White and Sleeping Beauty ("Agony" (reprise)). The group meet an angry Giantess, who demands Jack's whereabouts, saying he killed her husband (the giant who landed in Jack's yard). The characters acknowledge the narrator, and the Witch offers him up to the Giantess, but she drops and kills him. Jack's Mother arrives and defends her son, but the Steward kills her in a panic to protect the group. Rapunzel flees from the Witch, but is trampled by the Giantess. The Witch mourns Rapunzel ("Witch's Lament").

The Royal Family and Steward flee. The Witch vows to find Jack and offer him to the Giantess, so the Baker and his Wife split up to find him first, leaving Little Red with their son. Cinderella's Prince, searching for Cinderella, meets the Baker's Wife and seduces her ("Any Moment"). Meanwhile, the Baker finds Cinderella and convinces her to join him. The Baker's Wife is conflicted over her affair ("Moments In The Woods"), but before she can return to the Baker, she is trampled by the Giantess. The Witch finds Jack crying over the Baker's Wife's corpse and brings him to Cinderella, Little Red, and the Baker, informing them of her death. The group all blame each other for her death, before turning on the Witch ("Your Fault"). The Witch laments the group's impending doom and mocks them for not taking responsibility, then throws away the remaining beans and vanishes ("Last Midnight").

Stricken by grief, the Baker decides to abandon his son and leave. The Mysterious Man returns in spirit, pleading that the Baker not make the same mistakes he made; the Baker stays ("No More"). Cinderella discovers her Prince's infidelity and asks him to leave her alone. Little Red mourns her Grandmother after discovering she was killed by the Giantess, and is comforted by Cinderella. Meanwhile, the Baker informs Jack of his mother's death ("No One Is Alone").

After slaying the Giantess, Jack, Little Red, Cinderella, and the Baker begin their journey back to the village. The Princes return with their new princesses, as do the spirits of the Royal Family, who starved to death. The Baker doubts his abilities to be a parent on his own, and his Wife's spirit returns to comfort him. She asks him to tell their story, and the Baker does so (reciting the same line the narrator says at the beginning of Act I). The Witch returns and warns the audience to be careful of their wishes or stories told to children, and the group leaves the woods ("Children Will Listen").

== Musical numbers ==
Act I

- Prologue: "Into the Woods" – Narrator, Cinderella, Jack, Baker, Baker's Wife, Cinderella's Stepmother, Florinda, Lucinda, Jack's Mother, Little Red Ridinghood, Witch, Cinderella's Father
- "Cinderella at the Grave" – Narrator, Cinderella, Cinderella's Mother
- "Hello, Little Girl" – Wolf, Little Red
- "I Guess This Is Goodbye" – Jack
- "Maybe They're Magic" – Baker's Wife, Baker
- "Our Little World" – Rapunzel, Witch**
- "Maybe They're Magic" (reprise) – Baker*
- "I Know Things Now" – Little Red
- "A Very Nice Prince" – Cinderella, Baker's Wife
- "First Midnight" – company
- "Giants in the Sky" – Jack
- "Agony" – Cinderella's Prince, Rapunzel's Prince
- "A Very Nice Prince" (reprise) – Cinderella, Baker's Wife*
- "It Takes Two" – Baker's Wife, Baker
- "Second Midnight" – Witch, Cinderella, Cinderella's Prince, Rapunzel's Prince, Cinderella's Stepmother, Florinda, Lucinda, Granny, Narrator*
- "Stay with Me" – Witch, Rapunzel
- "On the Steps of the Palace" – Cinderella
- "Careful My Toe" – Narrator, Florinda, Cinderella's Stepmother, Lucinda, Cinderella's Mother, Cinderella's Prince, Cinderella's father*
- "So Happy" (prelude) – Cinderella, Cinderella's Prince, Baker, Baker's Wife*
- "Ever After" – Narrator, Florinda, Lucinda, Witch, company

Act II

- Prologue: "So Happy" – Narrator, Cinderella, Jack, Baker, Baker's Wife, Baker's child, Cinderella's Prince, Jack's Mother, Cinderella's Stepmother, Florinda, Lucinda, Witch
- Prologue: "Into the Woods" (reprise) – Baker, Baker's Wife, Jack, Little Red, Cinderella, Rapunzel
- "Agony" (reprise) – Cinderella's Prince, Rapunzel's Prince
- "Lament" – Witch
- "Any Moment" – Cinderella's Prince, Baker's Wife
- "Moments in the Woods" – Baker's Wife
- "Your Fault" – Jack, Baker, Witch, Cinderella, Little Red
- "Last Midnight" – Witch, Cinderella, Little Red, Baker
- "No More" – Baker, Mysterious Man
- "No One Is Alone" – Cinderella, Little Red, Baker, Jack
- "Finale: Children Will Listen" – company

*Not included in the original Broadway cast recording
**Added for the 1990 West End production

== Development ==
The development of Into the Woods first started when James Lapine and Stephen Sondheim came together for their second collaborative project after Sunday in the Park with George. Lapine and Sondheim wanted a fairy tale–themed musical; they tried writing their own quest fairy tale, but this was scrapped. Lapine suggested combining several folktales into one musical. They discussed incorporating One Thousand and One Nights stories, or styling the production as a fantasy computer game.

"Into the Woods" first appeared as a workshop performance at the Old Globe Theatre in San Diego, California, on December 4, 1986, which ran for 50 performances under the direction of Lapine. Many of the performers from that production were in the Broadway cast. Kay McClelland, who played Rapunzel and Florinda in San Diego, played Florinda on Broadway.

Throughout the run, dialogue, plot details, and songs were being rewritten or even cut entirely. For example, the Baker's Wife in the Old Globe production was not crushed by the Giantess. Instead, she ate a poisoned apple, in the manner of "Snow White". A reference to "The Three Little Pigs" in San Diego later returned for the 2002 Broadway revival. The song "Giants in the Sky" had different lyrics, and "So Happy", "Lament", and "Second Midnight" had extra lyrics. Many longer versions of the songs were cut for Broadway, but the longer version of "Lament" was preserved in the Broadway cast recording and was used in later productions.

== Productions ==
=== Original Broadway (1987) ===
Into the Woods opened on Broadway at the Martin Beck Theatre on November 5, 1987, and closed on September 3, 1989, after 765 performances. It starred Bernadette Peters as the Witch, Joanna Gleason as the Baker's Wife, Chip Zien as the Baker, Robert Westenberg as the Wolf/Cinderella's Prince, Tom Aldredge as the Narrator/Mysterious Man, Kim Crosby as Cinderella, Danielle Ferland as Little Red Ridinghood, Ben Wright as Jack, Chuck Wagner as Rapunzel's Prince, Barbara Bryne as Jack's Mother, Pamela Winslow as Rapunzel, Merle Louise as Cinderella's Mother/Granny/Giantess, Edmund Lyndeck as Cinderella's father, Joy Franz as Cinderella's Stepmother, Philip Hoffman as the Steward, Lauren Mitchell as Lucinda, Kay McClelland as Florinda, Jean Kelly as Snow White, and Maureen Davis as Sleeping Beauty. It was directed by Lapine, with musical staging by Lar Lubovitch, sets by Tony Straiges, lighting by Richard Nelson, and costumes by Ann Hould-Ward (based on original concepts by Patricia Zipprodt and Ann Hould-Ward). The production won the 1988 New York Drama Critics' Circle Award and the Drama Desk Award for Outstanding Musical, and the original cast recording won a Grammy Award for Best Musical Cast Show Album at the 31st Annual Grammy Awards. The show was nominated for ten Tony Awards at the 42nd Tony Awards, and won three: Best Original Score (Sondheim), Best Book (Lapine) and Best Actress in a Musical (Gleason).

Peters left the show after almost five months, and replacements for the Witch were Betsy Joslyn; Phylicia Rashad, Nancy Dussault and Ellen Foley. Other notable cast replacements included Dick Cavett as the Narrator, Edmund Lyndeck as the Mysterious Man, Patricia Ben Peterson as Cinderella, LuAnne Ponce returning as Little Red, Jeff Blumenkrantz as Jack, Marin Mazzie as Rapunzel, Dean Butler as Rapunzel's Prince, Cindy Robinson as Snow White, and Cynthia Sikes and Mary Gordon Murray as the Baker's Wife. From May 23 to 25, 1989, the original cast (except with Cindy Robinson as Snow White) reunited for three performances to tape the show for the Season 10 premiere episode of PBS's American Playhouse, which first aired on March 15, 1991. The show was filmed on the set of the Martin Beck Theatre in front of audiences, with certain elements slightly changed for the recording to better fit the screen, and with lighting and minor costume differences. There were also pick-up shots not filmed in front of an audience. The video was later released on VHS and DVD and, on occasion, remastered and rereleased.

Tenth Anniversary benefit performances were held on November 9, 1997, at the Broadway Theatre in New York, with most of the original cast. Wagner played the Wolf/Cinderella's Prince, Jonathan Dokuchitz played Rapunzel's Prince, and Blumenkrantz played the Steward. This concert included the duet "Our Little World". On November 9, 2014, most of the original cast reunited for a reunion concert and discussion in Costa Mesa, California. Mo Rocca hosted and interviewed Sondheim, Lapine, and each cast member. Appearing were Peters, Gleason, Zien, Ferland, Wright and husband and wife Westenberg and Crosby. The same group presented another discussion/concert on June 21, 2015, at the Brooklyn Academy of Music, New York City.

=== US tour (1988) ===
A U.S. tour started performances on November 22, 1988. The cast included Cleo Laine as the Witch, Rex Robbins as the Narrator and Mysterious Man, Ray Gill and Mary Gordon Murray as the Baker and his wife, Kathleen Rowe McAllen as Cinderella, Chuck Wagner as the Wolf/Cinderella's Prince, Douglas Sills as Rapunzel's Prince, Robert Duncan McNeill and Charlotte Rae as Jack and his mother, Marcus Olson as the Steward, and Susan Gordon Clark reprising her role as Florinda from the Broadway production. The set was almost completely reconstructed, and there were certain changes to the script, changing certain story elements. Notable cast replacements included Joslyn as the Witch, Peter Walker as the Narrator/Mysterious Man, Olson as the Baker, Stuart Zagnit as the Steward, and Patricia Ben Peterson as Cinderella. The tour ran at the John F. Kennedy Center for the Performing Arts from June to July 1989, where The Washington Post review called the "lovely score – poised between melody and dissonance ... the perfect measure of our tenuous condition. The songs invariably follow the characters' thinking patterns, as they weigh their options and digest their experience. Needless to say, that doesn't make for traditional show-stoppers. But it does make for vivacity of another kind. And Sondheim's lyrics ... are brilliant. ... I think you'll find these cast members alert and engaging."

=== Original West End (1990) ===
The album cover of the London cast recording

The original West End production opened on September 25, 1990, at the Phoenix Theatre and closed on February 23, 1991, after 197 performances. It was directed by Richard Jones and produced by David Mirvish, with set design by Richard Hudson, choreography by Anthony Van Laast, costumes by Sue Blane, and orchestrations by Jonathan Tunick. The cast featured Julia McKenzie as the Witch, Ian Bartholomew as the Baker, Imelda Staunton as the Baker's Wife and Clive Carter as the Wolf/Cinderella's prince. The show was nominated for seven Olivier Awards in 1991, winning Best Actress in a Musical (Staunton) and Best Director of a Musical (Jones).

The song "Our Little World" was added. A duet for the Witch and Rapunzel, it gives further insight into the Witch's care for her self-proclaimed daughter and the desire Rapunzel has to see the world outside her tower. The show's overall feel was darker than that of the original Broadway production. Critic Michael Billington wrote: "But the evening's triumph belongs also to director Richard Jones, set designer Richard Hudson and costume designer Sue Blane]who evoke exactly the right mood of haunted theatricality. Old-fashioned footlights give the faces a sinister glow. The woods themselves are a semi-circular, black-and-silver screen punctuated with nine doors and a crazy clock: they achieve exactly the 'agreeable terror' of Gustave Doré's children's illustrations. And the effects are terrific: doors open to reveal the rotating magnified eyeball or the admonitory finger of the predatory giant."

=== Off West End London revivals (1998, 2007, 2010 and 2025) ===
An intimate production of the show opened at the Donmar Warehouse on November 16, 1998, closing on February 13, 1999. It was directed by John Crowley and designed by his brother, Bob Crowley. The cast included Clare Burt as the Witch, Nick Holder as the Baker, Sophie Thompson as the Baker's Wife, Jenna Russell as Cinderella, Sheridan Smith as Little Red, Damian Lewis as the Wolf/Cinderella's Prince, and Frank Middlemass as the Narrator. Thompson won the 1999 Laurence Olivier Award for Best Actress in a Musical; the production was nominated for Outstanding Musical Production.

A revival at the Royal Opera House's Linbury Studio in Covent Garden ran from June 14 to 30, 2007, followed by a short stint at The Lowry theatre, Salford Quays, Manchester on July 4–7. The production mixed opera singers, musical theatre actors, and film and television actors, including Anne Reid (Jack's mother) and Gary Waldhorn (the narrator), Suzie Toase (Little Red), Peter Caulfield (Jack), Beverley Klein (Witch), Anna Francolini (Baker's Wife), Clive Rowe (Baker), Nicholas Garrett (Wolf/Cinderella's Prince), and Lara Pulver (Lucinda). This was the second Sondheim musical to be staged by the Opera House, following 2003's Sweeney Todd: The Demon Barber of Fleet Street.. Directed by Will Tuckett, it received mixed reviews, although there were clear standout performances.

A production at Regent's Park Open Air Theatre in London, directed by Timothy Sheader and choreographed by Liam Steel, ran from 6 August to 11 September 2010. The cast included Hannah Waddingham as the Witch, Mark Hadfield as the Baker, Jenna Russell as the Baker's Wife, Helen Dallimore as Cinderella, Michael Xavier as the Wolf/Cinderella's prince, and Judi Dench as the recorded voice of the Giantess. Gareth Valentine was the musical director. While the book remained mostly unchanged, the subtext of the story was altered by casting the role of the Narrator as a young school boy lost in the woods following a family argument, which further illustrated the musical's themes of parenting and adolescence. The production opened to positive reviews, with much of the press commenting on the effectiveness of the open-air setting. The Daily Telegraph reviewer, for example, wrote: "It is an inspired idea to stage this show in the magical, sylvan surroundings of Regent's Park, and designer Soutra Gilmour has come up with a marvellously rickety, adventure playground of a set, all ladders, stairs and elevated walkways, with Rapunzel discovered high up in a tree." The New York Times reviewer commented: "The natural environment makes for something genuinely haunting and mysterious as night falls on the audience". The production won the Laurence Olivier Award for Best Musical Revival at the 2011 Laurence Olivier Awards. It was captured by live by Digital Theatre+.

A production directed by Jordan Fein, with set and costume designs by Tom Scutt and lighting design by Aideen Malone, played at London's Bridge Theatre; previews began on December 2, 2025, with an official opening on December 11. The production closed on May 30, 2026. The production starred Jamie Parker as the Baker, Katie Brayben as the Baker's Wife, Kate Fleetwood as the Witch, Michael Gould as the Narrator/Mysterious Man, Gracie McGonigal as Little Red Ridinghood, Chumisa Dornford-May as Cinderella, Oliver Savile as the Wolf/Cinderella's Prince and Jo Foster as Jack. Critical reaction was favorable. It received nominations for eleven Laurence Olivier Awards at the 2026 ceremony, winning two, including for Best Musical Revival. Melanie La Barrie, Rachel Tucker, and John Owen-Jones joined the cast in April 2026 as the Witch, the Baker's Wife, and the Narrator/Mysterious Man.

=== Broadway revival (2002) ===
A poster for the 2002 Broadway revival

A revival opened at the Ahmanson Theatre in Los Angeles, running from February 1 to March 24, 2002. It had the same director, choreographer, and principal cast that began performances on Broadway a month later.

The 2002 Broadway revival, directed by Lapine and choreographed by John Carrafa, began previews on April 13, 2002, and opened on April 30 at the Broadhurst Theatre, closing on December 29 after a run of 18 previews and 279 regular performances. It starred Vanessa Williams as the Witch, John McMartin as the Narrator/Mysterious Man, Stephen DeRosa as the Baker, Kerry O'Malley as the Baker's Wife, Gregg Edelman as the Wolf/Cinderella's prince, Christopher Sieber as the Wolf/Rapunzel's prince, Molly Ephraim as Little Red, Adam Wylie as Jack, and Laura Benanti as Cinderella. Judi Dench provided the Giantess's pre-recorded voice. The production featured designs by Douglas W. Schmidt (sets), Susan Hilferty (costumes), Brian MacDevitt (lighting), Dan Moses Schreier (sound) and Elaine J. McCarthy (projection). The revival won Tonys for the best revival and lighting design at the 56th Tony Awards.

Lapine revised the script slightly for this production, with a cameo appearance of the Three Little Pigs restored from the earlier San Diego production. There were also various small dialogue changes; a new song "Our Little World"; a second wolf who ogles the Three Little Pigs (portrayed by the same actor as Rapunzel's prince); Milky White was played by a live performer (Chad Kimball) in an intricate costume; new lyrics for "Last Midnight", now a menacing lullaby sung by the Witch to the Baker's baby; and the ending also got new lyrics. The Witch starts aging again due to her losing the beans, and she sinks into the stage crying out: "Mother, here I come!", as opposed to the traditional "and the boom–crunch!"

=== Other U.S. productions (2012–2022) ===
The 2007 Regent's Park London production transferred to the Public Theater's 2012 free summer series, Shakespeare in the Park, at the Delacorte Theater in Central Park, New York City, with an American cast and new designers. The cast included Amy Adams as the Baker's Wife, Donna Murphy as the Witch, Denis O'Hare as the Baker, Chip Zien (the Baker in the 1987 Broadway cast) as the Mysterious Man/Cinderella's father, Ivan Hernandez as the Wolf/Cinderella's prince, Jessie Mueller as Cinderella, Jack Broderick as the young Narrator, Gideon Glick as Jack, Cooper Grodin as Rapunzel's Prince, Sarah Stiles as Little Red, Josh Lamon as the Steward, and Glenn Close as the voice of the Giantess. Sheader again directed, and Steel served as co-director and choreographer. Performances ran from July 24 until September 1. The set was a collaboration between Gilmour and John Lee Beatty and rose "over 50 feet in the air, with a series of tree-covered catwalks and pathways". There were reports of a possible Broadway transfer, but scheduling conflicts prevented this.

A Roundabout Theatre Company production directed by Noah Brody and Ben Steinfeld first played in May 2013 at the McCarter Theatre in Princeton, New Jersey in association with the Fiasco Theater. It transferred to the Laura Pels Theatre in New York with previews beginning December 18, 2014, an opening on January 22, 2015, and closed on March 22, 2015. The cast included Jennifer Mudge as the Witch, Steinfeld as the Baker and Jessie Austrian as the Baker's Wife. For its annual fully staged musical, the Hollywood Bowl produced Into the Woods from July 26–28, 2019, directed and choreographed by Robert Longbottom. The cast included Skylar Astin as the Baker, Sutton Foster as the Baker's Wife, Patina Miller as the Witch, Sierra Boggess as Cinderella, Cheyenne Jackson as the Wolf/Cinderella's Prince, Chris Carmack as Rapunzel's Prince, Gaten Matarazzo as Jack, Anthony Crivello as the Mysterious Man, Edward Hibbert as the Narrator, Shanice Williams as Little Red, Hailey Kilgore as Rapunzel, Rebecca Spencer as Jack's Mother, original Broadway cast member Gregory North as Cinderella's father, and Whoopi Goldberg as the voice of the Giantess

New York City Center staged Into the Woods as part of its Encores! series from May 4–15, 2022, directed by Encores! artistic director Lear deBessonet. The cast starred Heather Headley as the Witch, Neil Patrick Harris as The Baker and Sara Bareilles as the Baker's Wife, with Denée Benton as Cinderella, Cole Thompson as Jack, Ann Harada as Jack's Mother, Julia Lester as Little Red, Shereen Pimentel as Rapunzel, Gavin Creel as Cinderella's Prince/Wolf, Jordan Donica as Rapunzel's Prince, Annie Golden as Grandmother/Cinderella's Mother/Giant's Wife, David Patrick Kelly as Narrator/Mysterious Man, Ta'nika Gibson as Lucinda, Lauren Mitchell (who played Lucinda in the 1987 Broadway production) as Cinderella's Stepmother, Albert Guerzon as Cinderella's Father, Brooke Ishibashi as Florinda, Kennedy Kanagawa as Milky White, Lauren Mitchell as Cinderella's Stepmother and David Turner as Steward Donica tested positive for COVID-19, and so Jason Forbach played Rapunzel's Prince for the first week of performances.

Poster, 2022 Broadway revival

=== Broadway revival (2022) ===
The Encores! production transferred to Broadway at the St. James Theatre, with previews beginning June 28, opening on July 10, 2022, to universally positive reviews. While many of the Encores! cast transferred, changes included Brian d'Arcy James as the Baker, Patina Miller as the Witch, Phillipa Soo as Cinderella, Joshua Henry as Rapunzel's Prince, Nancy Opel as Cinderella's Stepmother, Aymee Garcia as Jack's Mother, and Alysia Velez as Rapunzel. A cast recording was released on September 30, 2022, which won Grammy Award for Best Musical Theater Album in 2023. The production was nominated for six Tony Awards.

Replacements included married couple Stephanie J. Block and Sebastian Arcelus as the Baker's Wife and the Baker, Krysta Rodriguez as Cinderella, and Jim Stanek as the Steward, Montego Glover shared the role of the Witch, Andy Karl was the Wolf/Cinderella's Prince and later Rapunzel's Prince, Harada as Jack's mother. Others were Cheyenne Jackson as the Wolf and Cinderella's Prince, Benton as Cinderella, Joaquina Kalukango as the Witch, and Arcelus as the Baker. The production closed on January 8, 2023.

=== US tour (2023) ===
The 2022 Broadway revival production toured the U.S. in 2023, starting on February 18. Glover, Arcelus, Block, Creel, Thompson, Geraghty, Kelly, Opel, Garcia (from Boston onward), Gibson, Ishibashi, Stanek, Velez, Kanagawa and Phelan all reprised their Broadway roles. Jason Forbach and Felicia Curry played Rapunzel's Prince and the Giantess/Cinderella's Mother/Granny, respectively. Rayanne Gonzales was Jack's Mother (in Buffalo and Washington, D.C. only), Josh Breckenridge was Cinderella's father/puppeteer. Replacements included Karl as Rapunzel's Prince, Forbach as the Baker, and Rodriguez as Cinderella. The tour visited ten cities.

=== West End revival (2026) ===
The 2025 Bridge Theatre production transferred to the Noël Coward Theatre on 22 September 2026 with an opening night on 7 October. It is scheduled to play until 9 January 2027, with Fleetwood again as The Witch and McGonigal again as Little Red. Others include Simbi Akande as Cinderella, John Dagleish as the Baker, Fiona Finsbury as Rapunzel, Lucas Koch as Rapunzel's Prince, Laura Pitt-Pulford as the Baker's Wife, Jack Quarton as Steward, Keith Ramsay as Jack, Matthew Seadon-Young as Cinderella's Prince/Wolf, Michael S. Siegel as Narrator, Valda Aviks as Grandmother/Giant, Geoffrey Aymer as Cinderella's Father, Jennifer Hepburn as Cinderella's Stepmother and Alternate Witch, Hana Ichijo as Lucinda, Julie Jupp as Jack's Mother and Gabrielle Lewis-Dodson as Florinda.

=== Other productions ===
An Australian production played in Sydney from March 19 to June 5, 1993, at the Drama Theatre, Sydney Opera House. It starred Judi Connelli as the Witch, Geraldine Turner as the Baker's Wife, Tony Sheldon as the Baker, Philip Quast as the Wolf/Cinderella's Prince, Pippa Grandison as Cinderella, Sharon Millerchip as Little Red, and D. J. Foster as Rapunzel's Prince. Melbourne Theatre Company played the musical from January 17 to February 21, 1998, at the Playhouse, Victorian Arts Centre. It starred Rhonda Burchmore as the Witch, John McTernan as the Baker, Gina Riley as the Baker's Wife, Lisa McCune as Cinderella, Robert Grubb as the Wolf/Cinderella's Prince, Peter Carroll as the Narrator/Mysterious Man, and Tamsin Carroll as Little Red.

In 2000, a U.S. regional production starred Pat Harrington, Jr. as the Narrator, Brian d'Arcy James as the Baker, Leah Hocking as the Baker's Wife, Tracy Katz as Little Red, Liz McCartney as the Witch, and Patricia Ben Peterson as Cinderella at the Ordway Center for the Performing Arts in Saint Paul, Minnesota. A 2005 Stratford Festival, production in Canada, directed by Peter Hinton-Davis, starred Peter Donaldson as the Narrator, Bruce Dow as the Baker, and Thom Allison as the Wolf. In 2009, a production was staged in Sacramento, California, by the Wells Fargo Pavilion. It starred Yvette Cason as the Witch, Jeffry Denman as the Baker, Vicki Lewis as his wife, Tracy Katz reprising her role as Little Red from the first national tour, Jason Forbach as the Wolf/Rapunzel's Prince, Gordon Goodman as Cinderella's Prince, Kim Huber as Cinderella, Matthew Wolpe as Jack, and Michael G. Hawkins as the Narrator/Mysterious Man. A 25th-anniversary co-production in 2012 between Baltimore, Maryland's Center Stage and Westport Country Playhouse, directed by Mark Lamos, cast the original Little Red, Danielle Ferland, as the Baker's Wife. The cast also included Erik Liberman as the Baker, Lauren Kennedy as the Witch, Jeffry Denman as the Narrator, Nik Walker as the Wolf/Cinderella's Prince, Dana Steingold as Little Red, Justin Scott Brown as Jack, Jenny Latimer as Cinderella, Cheryl Stern as Jack's Mother, Robert Lenzi as Rapunzel's Prince/Cinderella's father, Alma Cuervo as Cinderella's Stepmother/Granny/Giantess, Britney Coleman as Rapunzel/Cinderella's Mother, Nikka Lanzarone as Florinda, Eleni Delopoulos as Lucinda, and Jeremy Lawrence as the Mysterious Man.

The first professional Spanish language production, Dentro del Bosque, was produced by University of Puerto Rico Repertory Theatre and premiered in San Juan at Teatro de la Universidad (University Theatre) on March 14, 2013. The cast included Víctor Santiago as the baker, Ana Isabelle as the Baker's Wife and Lourdes Robles as the Witch. In 2014, a production premiered in Paris, France, at the Théâtre du Châtelet from April 1–12. It starred Nicholas Garrett as the Baker, Francesca Jackson as Little Red, Kimy McLaren as Cinderella, Christine Buffle as the Baker's Wife, Beverley Klein as the Witch, Pascal Charbonneau and Rebecca de Pont Davies as Jack and his mother, Damian Thantrey as the Wolf/Cinderella's Prince, David Curry as the Wolf/Rapunzel's Prince, Louise Alder as Rapunzel, and Fanny Ardant as the voice of the Giantess. A production by the Oregon Shakespeare Festival, directed by Amanda Dehnert, ran in the festival's outdoor Elizabethan Theatre from June 4 through October 11, 2014. The cast included Anthony Heald as Narrator and Mysterious Man, and Catherine E. Coulson as Stepmother, Milky White and the Giant. In the festival's 2025 revival of the production, Heald reprised his roles and Coulson, who died in 2015, appeared again as the Giant in video projections. The Roundabout Theatre production, directed by Noah Brody and Ben Steinfeld, began performances off-Broadway at the Laura Pels Theatre on December 19, 2014, in previews, opened on January 22, 2015, and closed on April 12, 2015. Like the original Broadway production, this production had a try-out run at the Old Globe Theatre in San Diego, California, from July 12 to August 17, 2014 with the opening night taking place on July 17. This version was minimalistically reimagined by the Fiasco Theater Company, featuring only ten actors playing multiple parts, and one piano accompanist. A national tour of the production began on November 29, 2016.

The DreamCatcher Theatre production opened in January 2015 and played at the Adrienne Arsht Center in Miami, Florida. Tituss Burgess starred as the Witch, the first male actor to do so. The cast also included Arielle Jacobs as the Baker's Wife, JJ Caruncho as the Baker, Justin John Moniz as the Wolf/Cinderella's Prince, Wayne LeGette as the Narrator/Mysterious Man, Annemarie Rosano as Cinderella, and Matthew Janisse as Rapunzel's Prince. The musical ran at The Muny in St. Louis, Missouri, from July 21–28, 2015. The cast included Heather Headley (Witch), Erin Dilly (Baker's Wife), Rob McClure (Baker), Ken Page (Narrator), Elena Shaddow (Cinderella), Andrew Samonsky (Wolf/Cinderella's Prince), Samantha Massell (Rapunzel), and Michael McCormick (Mysterious Man/Cinderella's father).

The Hart House Theatre production in Toronto, Ontario, Canada, from January 15–30, 2016, and February 9–11, 2023. A production ran at the West Yorkshire Playhouse in Leeds in a collaboration with Opera North from June 2–25, 2016. An Israeli production in Hebrew, אל תוך היער (El Toch Ha-ya-ar), opened in Tel Aviv in August 2016, produced by The Tramp Productions and Stuff Like That, starring Roi Dolev as the Witch, the second male actor to do so.

In 2017, a Danish language production ran from May 19 to June 24 at Glassalen in Tivoli, Copenhagen, starring Flemming Enevold as the narrator. The production opened again on March 18, 2022, running until April 23, starring Stig Rossen as the Narrator and Ghita Nørby as the voice of the Giantess. In 2019, there was a production done at the Patchogue Theatre in Long Island, New York, starring Constantine Maroulis as the Wolf/Cinderella's Prince, Melissa Errico as the Baker's Wife, Ali Ewoldt as Cinderella, Alice Ripley as the Witch, Jim Stanek as the Baker, Alan Muraoka as the Narrator/Mysterious Man, and Darren Ritchie as Rapunzel's Prince. Also in 2019, Into the Woods was mounted by the Barrington Stage Company in Pittsfield, Massachusetts. It starred Mykal Kilgore as the Witch, Mara Davi as the Baker's Wife, Jonathan Raviv as the Baker, Pepe Nufrio as Rapunzel's Prince, Sarah Dacey Charles as Cinderella's Stepmother/Granny/Cinderella's Mother, Dorcas Leung as Little Red, Amanda Robles as Cinderella, Thom Sesma as the Narrator/Mysterious Man, Kevin Toniazzo-Naughton as the Wolf/Cinderella's Prince, Clay Singer as Jack, Zoë Aarts as Lucinda, Megan Orticelli as Florinda, and Leslie Becker as the Giantess/Jack's Mother.

A 2022 production staged at Arkansas Repertory Theatre featured the pre-recorded voice of former first lady, United States Secretary of State, and Presidential nominee Hillary Clinton as the Giantess. A production by Belvoir St Theatre in Sydney, Australia, ran from March 23 to April 30, 2023.

A production played at the Theatre Royal in Bath, England, for 4 weeks starting on August 17, 2022. It was directed by Terry Gilliam and Leah Hausman. The show was first booked for the Old Vic Theatre in 2020 but was cancelled there due to the COVID-19 pandemic. The cast included Julian Bleach as the Mysterious Man, Nicola Hughes as the Witch, Rhashan Stone as the Baker, Alex Young as the Baker's Wife, Nathanael Campbell as the Wolf and Cinderella's Prince, Audrey Brisson as Cinderella, Barney Wilkinson as Jack, Gillian Bevan as Jack's Mother, Charlotte Jaconelli as Florinda, Maria Conneeley as Rapunzel, and Lauren Conroy as Little Red. The music director was Stephen Higgins; Jon Bausor was in charge of the production design and Anthony McDonald of the costumes. The conceit of the production was that the characters were figures in a young girl's Victorian toy theatre. The show opened to mostly positive reviews, with critics praising this "hallucinogenic take", with its "imaginative imagery" and "sheer spectacle" and Leah Hausman's "particularly crisp" choreography, while others regretted a lack of an "emotional connection between the characters and the audience". Reviews generally praised the cast, particularly Prendergast.

A 2025 Philippine production by Theatre Group Asia ran from August 7 to 31, 2025, at the Samsung Performing Arts Theater in Circuit Makati. The cast included Lea Salonga (the Witch), Arielle Jacobs (Cinderella), Eugene Domingo (Jack's Mother), Josh Dela Cruz (Prince Charming/Wolf), Nyoy Volante (the Baker), Mikkie Bradshaw-Volante (the Baker's Wife), Nic Chien (Jack), Joreen Bautista (Rapunzel/Cinderella's Mother/Sleeping Beauty), Mark Bautista (Rapunzel's Prince), Teetin Villanueva (Little Red Riding Hood), Tex Ordoñez-de Leon (Cinderella's Stepmother), Carla Guevara Laforteza (the Giant/Granny/Snow White), and Rody Vera (the Narrator/Mysterious Man). Chari Arespacochaga directed, with Clint Ramos as the creative director. It featured Philippine accents in the costumes, set design, and props.

== Principal casts ==
The original principal casts of major-market stage productions of Into the Woods.

Role	Broadway	US Tour	West End	Broadway	Broadway	US Tour
Role	1987	1988	1990	2002	2022	2023
The Witch	Bernadette Peters	Cleo Laine	Julia McKenzie	Vanessa Williams	Patina Miller	Montego Glover
The Baker	Chip Zien	Ray Gill	Ian Bartholomew	Stephen DeRosa	Brian d'Arcy James	Sebastian Arcelus
The Baker's Wife	Joanna Gleason	Mary Gordon Murray	Imelda Staunton	Kerry O'Malley	Sara Bareilles	Stephanie J. Block
Cinderella	Kim Crosby	Kathleen Rowe McAllen	Jacqui Dankworth	Laura Benanti	Phillipa Soo	Diane Phelan
Cinderella's Prince	Robert Westenberg	Chuck Wagner	Clive Carter	Gregg Edelman	Gavin Creel	Gavin Creel
The Wolf	Robert Westenberg	Chuck Wagner	Clive Carter	Gregg Edelman Christopher Sieber	Gavin Creel	Gavin Creel
Little Red Ridinghood	Danielle Ferland	Tracy Katz	Tessa Burbridge	Molly Ephraim	Julia Lester	Katy Geraghty
Jack	Ben Wright	Robert Duncan McNeill	Richard Dempsey	Adam Wylie	Cole Thompson	Cole Thompson
The Narrator	Tom Aldredge	Rex Robbins	Nicholas Parsons	John McMartin	David Patrick Kelly	David Patrick Kelly
The Mysterious Man	Tom Aldredge	Rex Robbins	John Rogan	John McMartin	David Patrick Kelly	David Patrick Kelly
Cinderella's Father	Edmund Lyndeck	Don Crosby	John Rogan	Dennis Kelly	Albert Guerzon	Josh Breckenridge
Rapunzel's Prince	Chuck Wagner	Douglas Sills	Mark Tinkler	Christopher Sieber	Joshua Henry	Jason Forbach
Jack's Mother	Barbara Bryne	Charlotte Rae	Patsy Rowlands	Marylouise Burke	Aymee Garcia	Rayanne Gonzales
Rapunzel	Pamela Winslow	Marguerite Lowell	Mary Lincoln	Melissa Dye	Alysia Velez	Alysia Velez
Florinda	Kay McClelland	Susan Gordon Clark	Elizabeth Brice	Tracy Nicole Chapman	Brooke Ishibashi	Brooke Ishibashi
Lucinda	Lauren Mitchell	Danette Cuming	Liza Sadovy	Amanda Naughton	Ta'Nika Gibson	Ta'Nika Gibson
Cinderella's Stepmother	Joy Franz	Jo Ann Cunningham	Ann Howard	Pamela Myers	Nancy Opel	Nancy Opel
Granny	Merle Louise	Nora Mae Lyng	Eunice Gayson	Pamela Myers	Annie Golden	Felicia Curry
The Giant	Merle Louise	Nora Mae Lyng	Eunice Gayson	Judi Dench (Pre-recorded)	Annie Golden	Felicia Curry
Cinderella's Mother	Merle Louise	Anne Rickenbacher	Eunice Gayson	Laura Benanti (Pre-recorded)	Annie Golden	Felicia Curry
The Steward	Philip Hoffman	Marcus Olson	Peter Ledbury	Trent Armand Kendall	David Turner	Jim Stanek

=== Notable replacements ===
==== Broadway (1987–89) ====
- Witch: Nancy Dussault, Betsy Joslyn, Phylicia Rashad, Ellen Foley
- Cinderella: Patricia Ben Peterson
- Jack: Jeff Blumenkrantz
- Narrator: Dick Cavett
- Mysterious Man: Edmund Lyndeck
- Rapunzel's Prince: Dean Butler
- Rapunzel: Marin Mazzie

==== US tour (1988-90) ====
- Witch: Betsy Joslyn
- Cinderella: Patricia Ben Peterson
- Narrator/Mysterious Man: Peter Walker
- Cinderella's Stepmother: Joy Franz
- Steward: Stuart Zagnit

==== Broadway revival (2002) ====
- Cinderella: Erin Dilly
- Cinderella's Stepmother: Joy Franz

==== Broadway revival (2022–23) ====
- Witch: Montego Glover, Joaquina Kalukango
- Baker: Sebastian Arcelus
- Baker's Wife: Stephanie J. Block
- Cinderella: Krysta Rodriguez, Denée Benton
- Cinderella's Prince/Wolf: Cheyenne Jackson, Andy Karl
- Rapunzel's Prince: Andy Karl
- Jack's Mother: Ann Harada
- Steward: Jim Stanek

==== US tour (2023) ====
- Baker: Jason Forbach
- Cinderella: Krysta Rodriguez
- Rapunzel's Prince: Andy Karl

== Analysis of book and music ==
In most productions of Into the Woods, including the original Broadway production, several parts are doubled. Cinderella's Prince and the Wolf, who both cannot control their appetites, are usually played by the same actor. Similarly, so are the Narrator and the Mysterious Man, who both comment on the story while avoiding any personal involvement or responsibility. Granny and Cinderella's Mother, both matriarchal characters, are also typically played by the same person, who also gives voice to the nurturing but later murderous Giantess.

The show covers multiple themes: growing up, parents and children, accepting responsibility, morality, and finally, wish fulfillment and its consequences. Time Magazine's reviewers wrote that the play's "basic insight... is at heart, most fairy tales are about the loving yet embattled relationship between parents and children. Almost everything that goes wrong—which is to say, almost everything that can—arises from a failure of parental or filial duty, despite the best intentions." Stephen Holden wrote that the show's themes include parent-child relationships and the individual's responsibility to the community. The Witch isn't just a scowling old hag, but a key symbol of moral ambivalence. Lapine said that the most unpleasant person (the Witch) would have the truest things to say and the "nicer" people would be less honest. In the Witch's words: "I'm not good; I'm not nice; I'm just right."

Given the show's debut during the 1980s, the height of the U.S. AIDS crisis, the work has been interpreted as a parable about AIDS. In this interpretation, the Giantess is a metaphor for HIV/AIDS, killing good and bad characters indiscriminately and forcing survivors to band together to stop the threat and move on from the devastation, reflecting the devastation AIDS wrought on many communities. When asked about the connection, Sondheim acknowledged that initial audiences interpreted it as an AIDS metaphor, but said that the work was not intended to be specific.

The score is also notable in Sondheim's output because of its intricate reworking and development of small musical motifs. In particular, the opening words, "I wish", are set to the interval of a rising major second and this small unit is both repeated and developed throughout the show, just as Lapine's book explores the consequences of self-interest and "wishing". The dialogue is characterized by the heavy use of syncopated speech. In many instances, the characters' lines are delivered with a fixed beat that follows natural speech rhythms, but is also purposely composed in eighth, sixteenth, and quarter note rhythms as part of a spoken song. Like many Sondheim/Lapine productions, the songs contain thought-process narrative, where characters converse or think aloud.

Sondheim drew on parts of his troubled childhood when writing the show. In 1987, he told Time Magazine that the "father uncomfortable with babies [was] his father, and [the] mother who regrets having had children [was] his mother."

== Adaptations ==
=== Junior and senior versions ===
The musical has been adapted by Music Theatre International into a child-friendly version for use by schools and young companies. Like other junior versions licensed through MTI, the show is shortened to 60 minutes and is a slightly modified version of the first act of the musical, ending the story on a happier note.

A similar adaptation, Into the Woods Sr., for performance by senior citizens in community centers and nursing homes, premiered In 2019 and is available under license.

=== Film ===
A theatrical film adaptation of the musical was produced by Walt Disney Pictures, directed by Rob Marshall, starring Meryl Streep as the Witch, Emily Blunt as the Baker's Wife, James Corden as the Baker, Anna Kendrick as Cinderella, Chris Pine as Cinderella's Prince, Daniel Huttlestone as Jack, Lilla Crawford as Little Red Ridinghood, Tracey Ullman as Jack's Mother, Billy Magnussen as Rapunzel's Prince, Christine Baranski as Cinderella's Stepmother, MacKenzie Mauzy as Rapunzel, Tammy Blanchard as Florinda, and Johnny Depp as the Wolf. The film was released on December 25, 2014. It was a critical and commercial hit, grossing $213 million worldwide. For her performance as the witch, Streep was nominated for the Academy Award for Best Supporting Actress at the 87th Academy Awards. The film also received Academy Award nominations for Best Production Design and Best Costume Design.

== Awards and nominations ==
=== Original Broadway production ===
Year	Award	Category	Nominee	Result
1988	Tony Awards	Best Musical		Nominated
1988	Tony Awards	Best Original Score	Stephen Sondheim	Won
1988	Tony Awards	Best Book of a Musical	James Lapine	Won
1988	Tony Awards	Best Direction of a Musical	James Lapine	Nominated
1988	Tony Awards	Best Performance by a Leading Actress in a Musical	Joanna Gleason	Won
1988	Tony Awards	Best Performance by a Featured Actor in a Musical	Robert Westenberg	Nominated
1988	Tony Awards	Best Choreography	Lar Lubovitch	Nominated
1988	Tony Awards	Best Scenic Design	Tony Straiges	Nominated
1988	Tony Awards	Best Costume Design	Ann Hould-Ward	Nominated
1988	Tony Awards	Best Lighting Design	Richard Nelson	Nominated
1988	Drama Desk Awards	Outstanding Musical		Won
1988	Drama Desk Awards	Outstanding Music	Stephen Sondheim	Nominated
1988	Drama Desk Awards	Outstanding Lyrics	Stephen Sondheim	Won
1988	Drama Desk Awards	Outstanding Book of a Musical	James Lapine	Won
1988	Drama Desk Awards	Outstanding Director of a Musical	James Lapine	Nominated
1988	Drama Desk Awards	Outstanding Actress in a Musical	Bernadette Peters	Nominated
1988	Drama Desk Awards	Outstanding Featured Actor in a Musical	Robert Westenberg	Won
1988	Drama Desk Awards	Outstanding Featured Actress in a Musical	Joanna Gleason	Won
1988	Drama Desk Awards	Outstanding Featured Actress in a Musical	Danielle Ferland	Nominated
1988	Drama Desk Awards	Outstanding Set Design	Tony Straiges	Nominated
1988	Drama Desk Awards	Outstanding Costume Design	Ann Hould-Ward	Nominated
1988	Drama Desk Awards	Outstanding Lighting Design	Richard Nelson	Nominated
1988	Drama Desk Awards	Outstanding Orchestrations	Jonathan Tunick	Nominated
1988	New York Drama Critics' Circle Award	Best Musical	Stephen Sondheim and James Lapine	Won

=== Original London production ===
Year	Award	Category	Nominee	Result
1991	Laurence Olivier Awards	Best New Musical		Nominated
1991	Laurence Olivier Awards	Best Director of a Musical	Richard Jones	Won
1991	Laurence Olivier Awards	Best Actor in a Musical	Ian Bartholomew	Nominated
1991	Laurence Olivier Awards	Best Actress in a Musical	Imelda Staunton	Won
1991	Laurence Olivier Awards	Best Actress in a Musical	Julia McKenzie	Nominated
1991	Laurence Olivier Awards	Best Performance in a Supporting Role in a Musical	Clive Carter	Nominated
1991	Laurence Olivier Awards	Best Costume Design	Sue Blane	Nominated

=== 1999 London revival ===
Year	Award	Category	Nominee	Result
1999	Laurence Olivier Awards	Outstanding Musical Production		Nominated
1999	Laurence Olivier Awards	Best Actress in a Musical	Sophie Thompson	Won

=== 2002 Broadway revival ===
Year	Award	Category	Nominee	Result
2002	Tony Awards	Best Revival of a Musical		Won
2002	Tony Awards	Best Performance by a Leading Actor in a Musical	John McMartin	Nominated
2002	Tony Awards	Best Performance by a Leading Actress in a Musical	Vanessa Williams	Nominated
2002	Tony Awards	Best Performance by a Featured Actor in a Musical	Gregg Edelman	Nominated
2002	Tony Awards	Best Performance by a Featured Actress in a Musical	Laura Benanti	Nominated
2002	Tony Awards	Best Direction of a Musical	James Lapine	Nominated
2002	Tony Awards	Best Choreography	John Carrafa	Nominated
2002	Tony Awards	Best Scenic Design	Douglas W. Schmidt	Nominated
2002	Tony Awards	Best Costume Design	Susan Hilferty	Nominated
2002	Tony Awards	Best Lighting Design	Brian MacDevitt	Won
2002	Drama Desk Awards	Outstanding Revival of a Musical		Won
2002	Drama Desk Awards	Outstanding Actress in a Musical	Laura Benanti	Nominated
2002	Drama Desk Awards	Outstanding Actress in a Musical	Vanessa Williams	Nominated
2002	Drama Desk Awards	Outstanding Featured Actor in a Musical	Gregg Edelman	Nominated
2002	Drama Desk Awards	Outstanding Featured Actress in a Musical	Kerry O'Malley	Nominated
2002	Drama Desk Awards	Outstanding Director of a Musical	James Lapine	Nominated
2002	Drama Desk Awards	Outstanding Set Design	Douglas W. Schmidt	Won
2002	Drama Desk Awards	Outstanding Costume Design	Susan Hilferty	Nominated
2002	Drama Desk Awards	Outstanding Sound Design	Dan Moses Schreier	Won

=== 2010 London revival ===
Year	Award	Category	Nominee	Result
2011	Laurence Olivier Award	Best Musical Revival		Won
2011	Laurence Olivier Award	Best Performance in a Supporting Role in a Musical	Michael Xavier	Nominated

=== 2012 New York revival ===
Year	Award	Category	Nominee	Result
2013	Drama Desk Award	Outstanding Actress in a Musical	Donna Murphy	Nominated

=== 2015 Off-Broadway production ===
Year	Award	Category	Result
2015	Drama Desk Awards	Outstanding Revival of a Musical	Nominated
2015	Drama League Awards	Outstanding Revival of a Broadway or Off-Broadway Musical	Nominated

=== 2022 Broadway revival ===
Year	Award	Category	Nominee	Result
2023	Tony Awards	Best Revival of a Musical		Nominated
2023	Tony Awards	Best Direction of a Musical	Lear deBessonet	Nominated
2023	Tony Awards	Best Leading Actor in a Musical	Brian d'Arcy James	Nominated
2023	Tony Awards	Best Leading Actress in a Musical	Sara Bareilles	Nominated
2023	Tony Awards	Best Featured Actress in a Musical	Julia Lester	Nominated
2023	Tony Awards	Best Sound Design of a Musical	Scott Lehrer and Alex Neumann	Nominated
2023	Drama Desk Awards	Outstanding Revival of a Musical		Nominated
2023	Drama Desk Awards	Outstanding Lead Performance in a Musical	Sara Bareilles	Nominated
2023	Drama Desk Awards	Outstanding Featured Performance in a Musical	Phillipa Soo	Nominated
2023	Drama Desk Awards	Outstanding Featured Performance in a Musical	Julia Lester	Nominated
2023	Drama Desk Awards	Outstanding Puppet Design	James Ortiz and Kennedy Kanagawa	Nominated
2023	Drama Desk Awards	Outstanding Sound Design in a Musical	Scott Lehrer and Alex Neumann	Won
2023	Drama League Awards	Distinguished Performance Award	Sara Bareilles	Nominated
2023	Drama League Awards	Distinguished Performance Award	Patina Miller	Nominated
2023	Drama League Awards	Outstanding Revival of Musical		Won
2023	Drama League Awards	Outstanding Direction of a Musical	Lear DeBessonet	Won
2023	Outer Critics Circle Awards			
2023	Outer Critics Circle Awards	Outstanding Revival of a Musical (Broadway or Off-Broadway)		Nominated
2023	Outer Critics Circle Awards	Outstanding Featured Performer in a Broadway Musical	Julia Lester	Nominated

=== 2023 US National tour ===
Year	Award	Category	Nominee	Result
2023	Elliot Norton Awards	Outstanding Visiting Musical		Won
2023	Elliot Norton Awards	Outstanding Visiting Performance in a Musical	Gavin Creel	Won
2024	Helen Hayes Award	Outstanding Visiting Performance in a Musical	Stephanie J. Block	Nominated

=== 2025 London revival ===
Year	Award	Category	Nominee	Result
2026	Laurence Olivier Awards	Best Musical Revival		Won
2026	Laurence Olivier Awards	Best Actor in a Musical	Jamie Parker	Nominated
2026	Laurence Olivier Awards	Best Actress in a Musical	Katie Brayben	Nominated
2026	Laurence Olivier Awards	Best Actor in a Supporting Role in a Musical	Jo Foster	Nominated
2026	Laurence Olivier Awards	Best Actor in a Supporting Role in a Musical	Oliver Savile	Nominated
2026	Laurence Olivier Awards	Best Actress in a Supporting Role in a Musical	Kate Fleetwood	Nominated
2026	Laurence Olivier Awards	Best Director	Jordan Fein	Nominated
2026	Laurence Olivier Awards	Best Costume Design	Tom Scutt	Nominated
2026	Laurence Olivier Awards	Best Set Design	Tom Scutt	Nominated
2026	Laurence Olivier Awards	Best Lighting Design	Aideen Malone (Lighting Design) & Roland Horvath (Video Design)	Won
2026	Laurence Olivier Awards	Best Sound Design	Adam Fisher	Nominated
