= Company (musical) =

1970 musical comedy by Stephen Sondheim

- Original Broadway playbill
- Music: Stephen Sondheim
- Lyrics: Stephen Sondheim
- Book: George Furth
- Premiere: March 24, 1970: Shubert Theatre, Boston
- Productions: 1970 Broadway; 1971 North American tour 1972 West End; 1995 Broadway revival 1995 London revival 2006 Broadway revival 2018 West End revival 2021 Broadway revival 2023 North American tour
- Awards: 1971 Tony Award for Best Musical; 1971 Tony Award for Best Book of a Musical; 1971 Tony Award for Best Score (music); 1971 Tony Award for Best Lyrics; 2007 Tony Award for Best Revival of a Musical; 2019 Laurence Olivier Award for Best Musical Revival; 2022 Tony Award for Best Revival of a Musical

Company is a musical with music and lyrics by Stephen Sondheim and book by George Furth. The original 1970 production was nominated for a record-setting 14 Tony Awards, winning six. Company was among the first book musicals to deal with contemporary dating, marriage, and divorce, and is a notable example of a concept musical lacking a linear plot. In a series of vignettes, Company follows bachelor Bobby interacting with his married friends, who throw a party for his 35th birthday.

== Background ==
George Furth wrote 11 one-act plays planned for Kim Stanley. Anthony Perkins was interested in directing and gave the material to Sondheim, who asked Harold Prince for his opinion. Prince said the plays could be a good basis for a musical about New York marriages with a central character to examine those marriages.

== Synopsis ==
In the early 1990s, Furth and Sondheim revised the libretto, cutting and altering dialogue that had become dated and rewriting the end of act one. This synopsis is based on the revised libretto.

=== Act I ===
Robert is a well-liked single man living in New York City whose friends are married or engaged couples. The couples are Joanne and Larry, Peter and Susan, Harry and Sarah, David and Jenny, and Paul and Amy. It is Robert's 35th birthday and the couples have gathered to throw him a surprise party. When Robert fails to blow out any candles on his birthday cake, the couples promise him that his birthday wish will still come true, although Robert wished for nothing, and said that his friends are all he needs ("Company").

What follows is a series of disconnected vignettes in no chronological order, each featuring Robert visiting with one of the couples or alone on a date with a girlfriend.

In the first vignette, Robert visits Sarah, a foodie who is dieting, and her husband, Harry, a recovering alcoholic. Sarah and Harry taunt each other on their vices, escalating toward karate-like fighting and thrashing that may or may not be playful. This prompts the caustic Joanne, the oldest, most cynical, and most-often divorced of Robert's friends, to sarcastically comment to the audience that it is the little things that make a marriage work ("The Little Things You Do Together"). Harry explains, and the men concur, that most people are both thankful and regretful about getting married, and that marriage changes both everything and nothing about the way they live ("Sorry – Grateful").

Robert is next with Peter and Susan, on their apartment terrace. Peter is an Ivy League graduate, and Susan is a Southern belle; the two seem to be a perfect couple, yet they surprise Robert with the news of their upcoming divorce. At the home of the uptight Jenny and chic David, Robert has brought along some marijuana that the three share. The couple turns to grilling Robert on why he has not yet gotten married. Robert claims he is not against the notion, but three women he is currently dating—Kathy, Marta, and April—appear and proceed, Andrews Sisters-style, to chastise Robert for his reluctance to being committed ("You Could Drive a Person Crazy"). After Jenny asks for another joint, but is discouraged by David, David privately tells Robert that Jenny does not actually like marijuana, but partakes in it as a show of her love for him.

All of Robert's male friends are envious about his commitment-free status, and each has found someone they find suitable for Robert ("Have I Got a Girl for You"), but Robert is waiting for someone who merges the best features of all his married female friends ("Someone Is Waiting").

Robert meets his three girlfriends in a small park on separate occasions, as Marta sings of the city: crowded, dirty, uncaring, yet somehow wonderful ("Another Hundred People"). Robert first gets to know April, a slow-witted airline flight attendant. Robert then spends time with Kathy. They had dated previously and both admit that they had each secretly considered marrying the other. They laugh at this coincidence before Robert suddenly considers the idea seriously. However, Kathy reveals that she is leaving for Cape Cod with a new fiancé. Finally, Robert meets with Marta; she loves New York, and babbles on about topics both highbrow and lowbrow. Robert is left stunned.

The scene turns to the day of Amy and Paul's wedding; they have lived together for years, but are just now getting married. Amy has gotten an overwhelming case of cold feet, and as the upbeat Paul harmonizes rapturously, a panicking Amy breaks the fourth wall and confesses to the audience that she can't go through with it ("Getting Married Today"). Robert, the best man, and Paul watch as Amy complains and self-destructs over every petty thing she can possibly think of, and then finally explicitly calls off the wedding. Paul dejectedly storms out into the rain and Robert tries to comfort Amy, but emotionally winds up offering an impromptu proposal to her himself. His words jolt Amy back into reality, and she runs out after Paul, at last ready to marry him. Before she leaves, Robert tosses Amy's bouquet over to her. She catches it, joyfully exclaiming: “I’m the next bride!”

The setting returns to the scene of the birthday party, where Robert is given his cake and tries to blow out the candles again. He wishes for something this time ("Marry Me A Little").

=== Act II ===
The birthday party scene is reset, and Robert goes to blow out his candles. This time, he gets them about half out, and the couples have to help him with the rest. The couples share their views on Robert – both complimentary and unflattering – with each other as Robert reflects on being the third wheel ("Side By Side By Side"), soon followed by the up-tempo paean to Robert's role as the perfect friend ("What Would We Do Without You?"). In a dance break in the middle of the number, each man, in turn, does a dance step that is answered by his wife. Robert likewise does a step but he has no partner to answer it.

Robert brings April to his apartment for a nightcap, after a date. She marvels at how homey his place is, and he casually leads her to the bed, sitting next to her on it and working on getting her into it. She earnestly tells him of an experience from her past, involving the death of a butterfly; he counters with a bizarre remembrance of his own, obviously fabricated and designed to put her in the mood to succumb to his seduction. Meanwhile, the married women worry about Robert's single status and the unsuitable qualities they find in the women he dates ("Poor Baby"). As Robert and April have sex, we hear Robert and April's thoughts, interspersed with music that expresses and mirrors their increasing excitement ("Tick-Tock"). In some productions, including the original Broadway production, this is accompanied by a solo dance by Kathy. The next morning, April rises early, to report for duty aboard a flight to Barcelona. Robert tries to get her to stay, at first wholeheartedly, parrying her apologetic protestations that she cannot with playful begging and insistence. As April continues to reluctantly resist his entreaties, and sleepiness retakes him, Bobby loses conviction, agreeing that she should go; that change apparently gets to her, and she joyfully declares that she will stay, after all. This takes Robert by surprise, and his astonished, plaintive "Oh, God!" is suffused with fear and regret ("Barcelona").

Robert and Marta visit Peter and Susan, and learn that Peter flew to Mexico to get the divorce, but he phoned Susan and she joined him there for a vacation. Though they are divorced, they are still living together, claiming they have too many responsibilities to actually leave each other's lives, and that their relationship has actually been strengthened. Susan takes Marta inside to make lunch, and Peter asks Robert if he has ever had a homosexual experience. They both admit they have, and Peter hints at the possibility that Robert and he could have such an encounter, but Robert uncomfortably laughs off the conversation as a joke.

Joanne and Larry take Robert out to a nightclub, where Larry dances, and Joanne and Robert sit watching, getting thoroughly drunk. She blames Robert for always being an outsider, only watching life rather than living it, and also persists in berating Larry. She raises her glass in a mocking toast, passing judgment on various types of rich, middle-aged women wasting their lives away with mostly meaningless activities ("The Ladies Who Lunch"). Her harshest criticism is reserved for those, like herself, who "just watch", and she concludes with the observation that all these ladies are bound together by a terror that comes with the knowledge that "everybody dies". Larry returns from the dance floor, taking Joanne's drunken rant without complaint and explains to Robert that he still loves her dearly. When Larry leaves to pay the check, Joanne bluntly invites Robert to begin an affair with her, assuring him that she will "take care of him". Robert's reply, "But who will I take care of?" seems to surprise even him, and strikes Joanne as a profound breakthrough on his part. Robert insists he has been open to marriages and commitment, but questions "What do you get?" Upon Larry's return, Robert asks again, angrily, "What do you get?" Joanne declares, with some satisfaction, "I just did someone a big favor". She and Larry go home, leaving Robert lost in frustrated contemplation.

The couples' recurrent musical motif begins yet again, as they all again invite Robert to "drop by anytime...". Rather than the cheery, indulgent tone he had responded with in earlier scenes, Robert suddenly, desperately, shouts "STOP!" He sings, openly enumerating the many traps and dangers he perceives in marriage. Speaking their disagreements, his friends counter his ideas, one by one, encouraging him to dare to try for love and commitment. Finally, Robert's words change, expressing a desire, increasing in urgency, for loving intimacy, even with all its problems, and the wish to meet someone with whom to face the challenge of living ("Being Alive").

The opening party resets a final time; Robert's friends have waited two hours, with still no sign of him. At last, they all prepare to leave, expressing a new hopefulness about their absent friend's chances for loving fulfillment, and wishing him a happy birthday, wherever he may be, as they leave. Robert then appears alone, smiles, and blows out his candles ("Finale").

== Principal casts ==
Character	Broadway	North American tour	West End	Broadway revival	West End revival	Kennedy Center	Broadway revival	New York Philharmonic concert	West End revival (Note: Gender bent production)	Broadway revival (Note: Gender bent production)	North American tour (Note: Gender bent production)
Character	1970	1971	1972	1995	1996	2002	2006	2011	2018	2021	2023
Robert (Note: Sometimes referred to as "Bobby")	Dean Jones	George Chakiris	Larry Kert	Boyd Gaines	Adrian Lester	John Barrowman	Raúl Esparza	Neil Patrick Harris	Rosalie Craig (as Bobbie)	Katrina Lenk (as Bobbie)	Britney Coleman (as Bobbie)
Joanne	Elaine Stritch	Elaine Stritch	Elaine Stritch	Debra Monk	Sheila Gish	Lynn Redgrave	Barbara Walsh	Patti LuPone	Patti LuPone	Patti LuPone	Judy McLane
Larry	Charles Braswell	Robert Goss	Robert Goss	Timothy Landfield	Paul Bentley	Walter Charles	Bruce Sabath	Jim Walton	Ben Lewis	Terence Archie	Derrick Davis
Amy	Beth Howland	Beth Howland	Beth Howland	Veanne Cox	Sophie Thompson	Alice Ripley	Heather Laws	Katie Finneran	Jonathan Bailey (as Jamie)	Matt Doyle (as Jamie)	Matt Rodin (as Jamie)
Paul	Steve Elmore	Del Hinkley	Steve Elmore	Danny Burstein	Michael Simkins	Matt Bogart	Robert Cunningham	Aaron Lazar	Alex Gaumond	Etai Benson	Ali Louis Bourzgui
Sarah	Barbara Barrie	Marti Stevens	Marti Stevens	Kate Burton	Rebecca Front	Keira Naughton	Kristin Huffman	Martha Plimpton	Mel Giedroyc	Jennifer Simard	Kathryn Allison
Harry	Charles Kimbrough	Charles Braswell	Kenneth Kimmins	Robert Westenberg	Clive Rowe	David Pittu	Keith Buterbaugh	Stephen Colbert	Gavin Spokes	Christopher Sieber	James Earl Jones II
Susan	Merle Louise	Milly Ericson	Joy Franz	Patricia Ben Peterson	Clare Burt	Christy Baron	Amy Justman	Jill Paice	Daisy Maywood	Rashidra Scott	Marina Kondo
Peter	John Cunningham	Gary Krawford	J. T. Cromwell	Jonathan Dokuchitz	Gareth Snook	Dan Cooney	Matt Castle	Craig Bierko	Ashley Campbell	Greg Hildreth	Javier Ignacio
Jenny	Teri Ralston	Teri Ralston	Teri Ralston	Diana Canova	Liza Sadovy	Emily Skinner	Leenya Rideout	Jennifer Laura Thompson	Jennifer Saayeng	Nikki Renée Daniels	Emma Stratton
David	George Coe	Lee Goodman	Lee Goodman	John Hillner	Teddy Kempner	Marc Vietor	Fred Rose	Jon Cryer	Richard Henders	Christopher Fitzgerald	Matt Bittner
April	Susan Browning	Bobbi Jordan	Carol Richards	Jane Krakowski	Hannah James	Kim Director	Elizabeth Stanley	Christina Hendricks	Richard Fleeshman (as Andy)	Claybourne Elder (as Andy)	Jacob Dickey (as Andy)
Marta	Pamela Myers	Pamela Myers	Pamela Myers	LaChanze	Anna Francolini	Marcy Harriel	Angel Desai	Anika Noni Rose	George Blagden (as PJ)	Bobby Conte Thornton (as PJ)	Tyler Hardwick (as PJ)
Kathy	Donna McKechnie	Donna McKechnie	Donna McKechnie	Charlotte d'Amboise	Kiran Hocking	Elizabeth Zins	Kelly Jeanne Grant	Chryssie Whitehead	Matthew Seadon-Young (as Theo)	Manu Narayan (as Theo)	David Socolar (as Theo)

=== Notable replacements ===
Broadway (1970–1972)

- Robert: Larry Kert
- Joanne: Vivian Blaine, Jane Russell
- Larry: Stanley Grover
- Amy: Marian Haley
- Sarah: Cynthia Harris
- Harry: Kenneth Kimmins
- David: George D. Wallace
- Kathy: Priscilla Lopez

2nd Broadway revival (2006)

- Robert: Bradley Dean (s/b)

3rd Broadway revival (2020–2022)

- Joanne: Jennifer Simard
- David: Jeff Kready
- Theo: Kyle Dean Massey

== Song list ==
Act I

- "Company" – Robert and Company
- "The Little Things You Do Together" – Joanne and Couples
- "Sorry-Grateful" – Harry, David and Larry
- "You Could Drive a Person Crazy" – Kathy, April and Marta
- "Have I Got a Girl for You" – Larry, Peter, Paul, David, Harry
- "Someone Is Waiting" – Robert
- "Another Hundred People" – Marta
- "Getting Married Today" – Amy, Paul, Choirgirl, (Note: Played in most productions by the actor who plays Susan or Jenny.) and Company
- "Marry Me a Little"† – Robert

Act II

- "Side by Side by Side"/"What Would We Do without You?" – Robert and Couples
- "Poor Baby"^{$} – Sarah, Jenny, Susan, Amy, Joanne
- "Have I Got a Girl for You" (Reprise)^{€} – Larry, Peter, Paul, David, Harry
- "Tick-Tock"^{‡} – Kathy (Instrumental)
- "Barcelona" – Robert and April
- "The Ladies Who Lunch" – Joanne
- "Being Alive" – Robert and Couples
- "Finale" – Company

Notes on the songs

- † Restored permanently to close Act I and added in the 1995 revival and every following production
- € Only used in 1995 revival
- $ In gender bent productions, it is sung by the Husbands
- ‡ Abridged for the first Broadway revival and afterward deleted entirely from the score, however, has been restored in some productions, such as the 2011 New York Philharmonic staging, the 2021 Broadway revival and others

== Productions ==
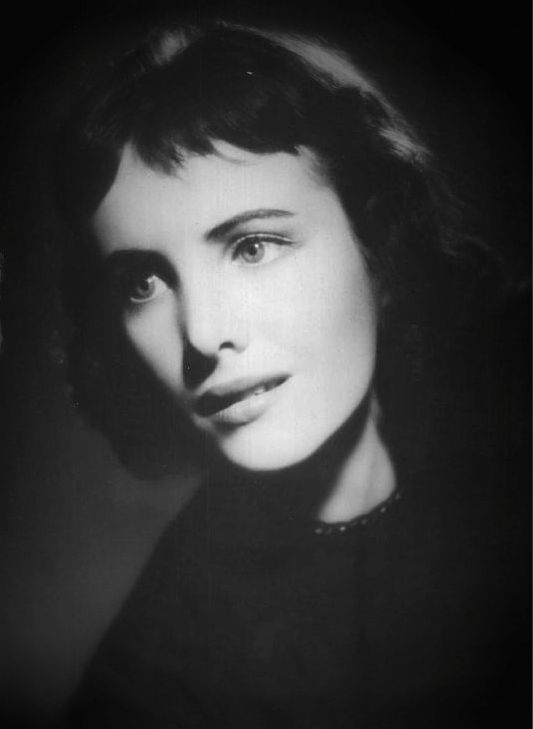
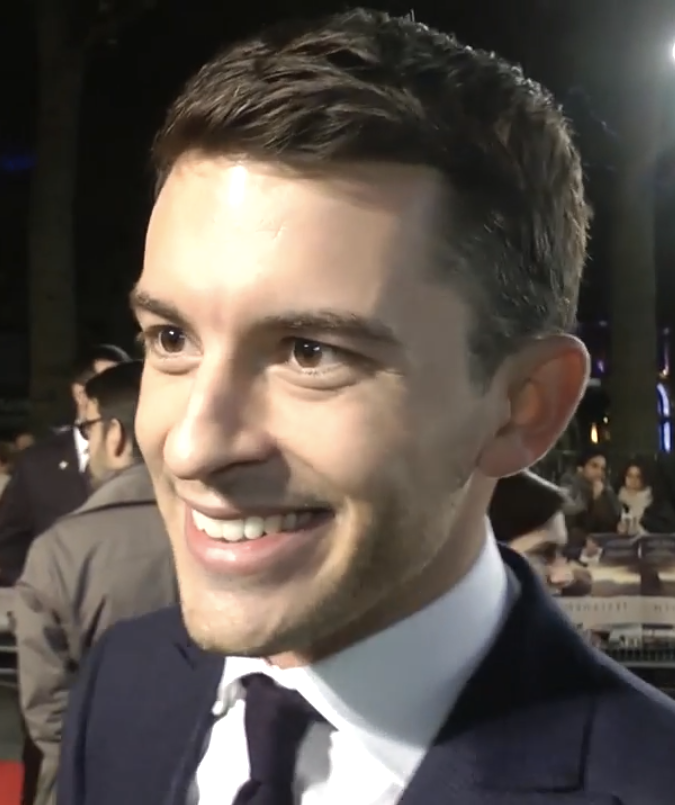
Beth Howland as Amy introduced the song "Getting Married Today" on Broadway in 1970, while Jonathan Bailey performed the song as Jamie, originating the gender-swapped role in the 2018 West End revival.

=== Original Broadway production ===
Company opened in Boston in out-of-town tryouts, receiving mixed reviews.

Directed by Hal Prince, the musical opened on Broadway at the Alvin Theatre on April 26, 1970, and closed on January 1, 1972, after 705 performances and 12 previews. The opening cast included Dean Jones, who replaced Anthony Perkins early in the rehearsals, Donna McKechnie, Susan Browning, George Coe, Pamela Myers, Barbara Barrie, Charles Kimbrough, Merle Louise, Beth Howland, and Elaine Stritch. Musical staging was by Michael Bennett, assisted by Bob Avian. The set design by Boris Aronson consisted of two working elevators and various vertical platforms that emphasized the musical's theme of isolation.

Displeased with the show and struggling with personal issues, Jones left the show on May 28, 1970, and was replaced by understudy Larry Kert, who had created the role of Tony in West Side Story.

In his September 2, 2015, obituary for Jones in The New York Times, Mike Flaherty reported that "he quit the production, citing stress and depression related to the recent collapse of his own marriage." Flaherty quotes Jones' 1982 autobiography, Under Running Laughter, in which he wrote of Company: "It was a clever, bright show on the surface, but its underlying message declared that marriage was, at best, a vapid compromise, insoluble and finally destructive."

Kert earned rave reviews for his performance, and the Tony Awards committee decided that he was eligible to compete for Best Actor in a Musical, an honor usually reserved for the actor who originates a role.

Original replacement cast members included John Cunningham, the original Peter, as Bobby, and Vivian Blaine and Jane Russell, as Joanne.

==== Original Cast Album: Company ====
Award-winning documentary filmmaker D. A. Pennebaker captured the making-of the original cast recording shortly after the show opened on Broadway. His 1970 film Original Cast Album: Company earned early accolades, as well as a cult following, for its unvarnished look at a grueling recording session. Stritch, Sondheim, and producer Thomas Z. Shepard are featured prominently.

==== First national tour ====
The first national tour opened on May 20, 1971, at the Ahmanson Theatre in Los Angeles, California, with George Chakiris as Bobby, and closed on May 20, 1972, at the National Theatre in Washington, D.C.

=== Original London production ===
The first West End production opened on January 18, 1972, at Her Majesty's Theatre, where it closed on November 4, 1972, after 344 performances. The original cast, directed by Harold Prince with choreography by Michael Bennett, featured Larry Kert, Elaine Stritch, Joy Franz (Susan), Beth Howland (Amy) and Donna McKechnie (Kathy). Dilys Watling (Amy) and Julia McKenzie (April) were replacements, later in the run.

With so many Broadway cast members reprising their roles, producers chose not to record a new cast album; instead, they re-released the original cast album, replacing Jones's vocals with Kert's, and branded it the London cast album.

=== Original Australian production ===
The Sydney Theatre Company presented the first Australian production at the Sydney Opera House's Drama Theatre in January and February 1986. Directed by Richard Wherrett, it featured John O'May as Bobby, Geraldine Turner as Joanne, with other cast members, including Tony Sheldon, Simon Burke, Terence Donovan, and Barry Quin.

=== 1993 reunion concerts ===
Most members of the original Broadway cast reunited in California for a concert to benefit Actors Fund of America AIDS charities and the Long Beach Civic Light Opera. Angela Lansbury served as host for the January 23, 1993, performance at the Terrace Theater, with narration by George Hearn. The reunion concert was repeated for two New York performances in April 1993, at the Vivian Beaumont Theater, directed by Barry Brown, with Patti LuPone as host. The excitement of the reunion concerts resonated, even in comparison to later full-scale revivals.

=== 1995 Broadway revival ===
After 43 previews, a revival for the Roundabout Theatre, directed by Scott Ellis and choreographed by Rob Marshall, opened October 5, 1995, at the Criterion Center Stage Right, where it ran for 68 performances. The cast included Boyd Gaines (Bobby), Kate Burton, Robert Westenberg (Harry), Diana Canova, Debra Monk (Joanne), LaChanze, Charlotte d'Amboise, Jane Krakowski, Danny Burstein (Paul), and Veanne Cox (Amy). This production was nominated for the Tony Award, Best Revival of a Musical.

=== 1995 London revival ===
A London revival directed by Sam Mendes at the Donmar Warehouse opened December 13, 1995, and closed there March 2, 1996; the production quickly transferred to the Albery Theatre, with previews starting March 7, opening March 13, and closing June 29. The cast included Adrian Lester, as the first Black actor to play Bobby in a major production of the show.

A videotaped recording of the Donmar Warehouse production was broadcast by BBC Two on March 1, 1997. On Sunday, November 7, 2010, a one-off concert of Company, starring most of the 1995 London revival cast, including Adrian Lester as Bobby, was held at the Queen's Theatre on Shaftesbury Avenue.

=== Kennedy Center production ===
A production for the Kennedy Center in Washington, D.C., presented as part of a summer-long celebration of Sondheim musicals, opened May 17, 2002, for a limited run of 17 performances. Directed by Sean Mathias, the cast included John Barrowman as Robert, Emily Skinner, Walter Charles, Alice Ripley, and Lynn Redgrave. The production used the book from the original Broadway production, instead of the 1995 revision.

=== 2006 Broadway revival ===
A new revival had try-outs at the Cincinnati Playhouse in the Park, Robert S. Marx Theatre in March through April 2006. The cast featured Raúl Esparza (Bobby) and Barbara Walsh (Joanne), with direction and choreography by John Doyle.

This production opened on Broadway on November 29, 2006, at the Ethel Barrymore Theatre. The actors themselves provided the orchestral accompaniment. For example, Esparza plays percussion, Walsh plays Orchestra Bells and percussion, and Heather Laws (Amy) plays French horn, trumpet and flute. The production won the Tony Award for Best Revival of a Musical. The musical closed on July 1, 2007, after 34 previews and 246 performances. The production was filmed for Great Performances and broadcast in 2008, with a subsequent DVD release.

=== 2007 Australian production ===
Kookaburra Musical Theatre mounted a production directed by Gale Edwards in Sydney in June 2007, starring David Campbell as Bobby, with a cast including Simon Burke, Anne Looby, James Millar, Pippa Grandison, Katrina Retallick, Tamsin Carroll and Christie Whelan. The show was well-received, and Sondheim travelled to Australia for the first time in thirty years to attend the opening night. However, the production caused major controversy when Whelan was out sick for one performance and (with no understudy) Kookaburra chief executive Peter Cousens insisted the show be performed anyway, but without the character of April. This involved cutting several numbers and scenes with no explanation, and that night's performance ended twenty minutes early. Following complaints from the audience, there was considerable negative press attention to the decision, and Sondheim threatened to revoke the production rights for the show.

=== 2011 New York Philharmonic concert ===
In April 2011, Lonny Price directed a staged concert production, with Neil Patrick Harris as Robert, Stephen Colbert as Harry, Craig Bierko as Peter, Jon Cryer as David, Katie Finneran as Amy, Christina Hendricks as April, Aaron Lazar as Paul, Jill Paice as Susan, Martha Plimpton as Sarah, Anika Noni Rose as Marta, Jennifer Laura Thompson as Jenny, Jim Walton as Larry, Chryssie Whitehead as Kathy, and Patti LuPone as Joanne. Paul Gemignani conducted a 35-piece orchestra, which used similar orchestrations to the first Broadway production. This concert followed a long tradition of Stephen Sondheim concert productions at the New York Philharmonic, including Sweeney Todd and Passion. The cast reunited on June 12, 2011, to perform "Side by Side by Side" on the 65th Tony Awards, hosted by Harris.

A filmed presentation of the three-night concert production saw limited theatrical release on June 15, 2011, with DVD and Blu-ray releases on November 13, 2012.

=== 2018 West End gender-bent production ===
"It's thrilling from beginning to end. And the last scene of Act I (which is now two guys) will completely shatter you, as well as it being one of the funniest scenes on record. All due to [Jonathan Bailey], the guy who plays Jamie, the Amy-equivalent. I only wish George Furth [the book's writer] could see it, as it definitively proves what Judy Prince said about him: he's J. D. Salinger."

— Stephen Sondheim after watching the first gender-swapped production of Company in the West End in 2018

A West End revival was staged at the Gielgud Theatre which started previews from September 26, 2018, and opened officially, on October 17. The production was part of Elliott & Harper Productions' debut season, a production company formed by director Marianne Elliott and producer Chris Harper. The revival/remake featured changes to the genders of several characters. The character of Bobby was changed to Bobbie, a female role, and was played by Rosalie Craig. Additionally, the production featured a same-sex couple for the first time, with Jonathan Bailey as cold-footed groom Jamie (originally written as the female character Amy) and Alex Gaumond as his devoted fiancé Paul. Sondheim approved the changes and worked on revisions of the script with director Elliott. Patti LuPone, Ben Lewis and Mel Giedroyc also starred.

Company topped the list of the 2019 Olivier Award nominations, alongside Come from Away, with nine nominations, winning Best Musical Revival. It also won Best Actress in a Supporting Role in a Musical (LuPone), Best Actor in a Supporting Role in a Musical (Bailey).

The cast recording was made available for digital release and streaming by Warner Classics on February 1, 2019. The production closed on March 30, 2019.

When I was auditioning in London, I couldn't find the person [to play Amy]. I also felt like this woman wasn't now, wasn't a very modern woman. So then I did a crazy thing — I asked a friend of mine, Jonathan Bailey... 'Would you mind just coming in and trying something for me? It's a bit crazy.'
We worked for maybe an hour and a half, and it wasn't perfect, but I felt (gasp), this is exciting, there's a potential here. So I then immediately got on the email to Steve, and I said, 'Steve, you have to be sitting down. You have to be having a glass of wine in your hand. And take a deep breath, but I'm going to say something to you: I think possibly we should change Amy into a man.' And Steve's reply sums him up, really, as a collaborator. He basically said, 'Marianne, you need to be sitting down, you need to have a glass of wine in your hand, you need to take a deep breath: I think it's a great idea.'

— Marianne Elliott on reimagining Amy as a man

=== 2021 Broadway gender-bent revival ===
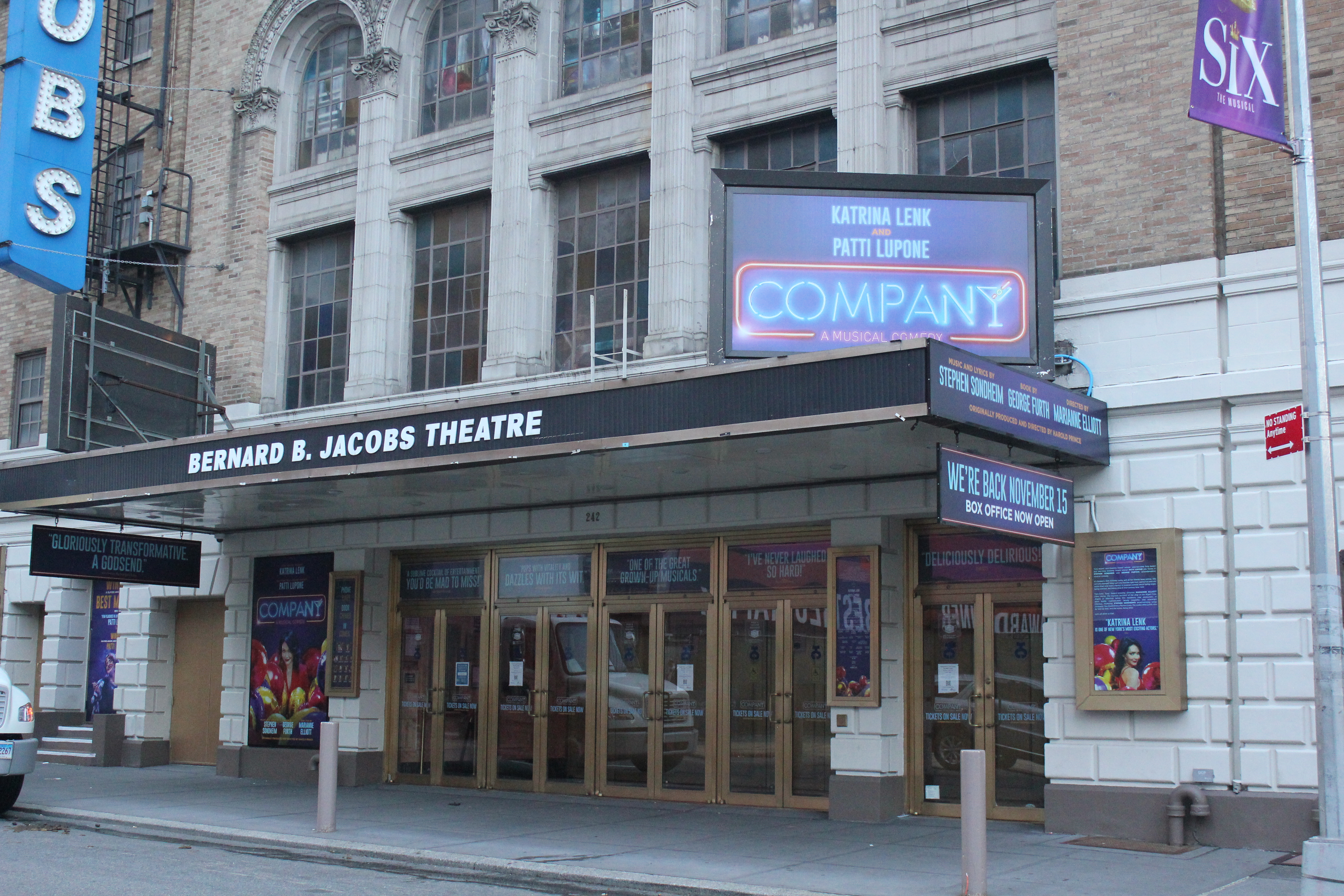
Branding of the 2021 Broadway revival, as seen on the Bernard B. Jacobs Theatre

A Broadway transfer of the 2018 West End revival opened December 9, 2021, to acclaim. Marianne Elliott once again directed, and Patti LuPone reprised her role as Joanne, with Katrina Lenk as Bobbie, choreography by Liam Steel, music supervision and direction by Joel Fram, scenic and costume designs by Bunny Christie, and lighting design by Neil Austin.

Originally slated to open on Sondheim's 90th birthday (March 22, 2020), the production began previews at the Bernard B. Jacobs Theatre on March 2. After nine preview performances, the production came to a halt due to the coronavirus pandemic. All Broadway shows went dark, and theatre closures were subsequently extended numerous times. The production resumed previews November 15, 2021, with Sondheim in attendance shortly before his death. The cast, musicians, and crew then dedicated their entire run to the late composer.

Five days before he died, Sondheim discussed the revival's change of the lead character's gender from male (Bobby) to female (Bobbie). He expressed how theater is distinguished from film and video because "you can do it in different ways from generation to generation… What keeps theater alive is the chance always to do it differently, with not only fresh casts, but fresh viewpoints. It's not just a matter of changing pronouns, but attitudes."

The production became the most nominated revival of the season, winning five of nine Tony Award nominations, including Best Revival of a Musical and Best Featured Actor in a Musical for Matt Doyle's performance as Jamie. The documentary film Keeping Company with Sondheim aired on Great Performances in May 2022, examining this production alongside the show's previous incarnations. The production closed July 31, 2022, after 265 performances and 32 previews.

==== Second national tour ====
The second North American tour opened on October 8, 2023, at the Proctor's Theatre in Schenectady, New York and closed on October 6, 2024, at the Bass Performance Hall in Fort Worth, Texas. The tour was led by Britney Coleman, who understudied Bobbie in the 2021 Broadway revival.

=== International productions ===
- A 1997 production was staged in the Philippines, by the Repertory Philippines as part of its 55th season. The production starred Cocoy Laurel as Bobby and Menchu Lauchengco-Yulo as Joanne.
- A Brazilian production ran from February 8 to April 22, 2001, at the Teatro Villa-Lobos in Rio de Janeiro. It reopened on April 27, 2001, at the Teatro Alfa in São Paulo and later returned to the Teatro Villa-Lobos in Rio de Janeiro.
- A 2010 production opened in Norway, at the National Venue of Norway (Den Nationale Scene) in Bergen. The cast included Jon Bleiklie Devik, Karoline Krüger/Ragnhild Gudbrandsen, Wenche Kvamme, and Monica Hjelle, among others.
- A 2011 Israeli production opened on May 28, 2011, at the Beersheba Theatre.
- A 2011 production by Sheffield Theatres opened at the Crucible Theatre, starring Daniel Evans as Bobby and Rosalie Craig as Marta, among others.
- A 2012 production opened in Lima, Peru, directed by Alberto Ísola. The cast included Rossana Fernández-Maldonado, Marco Zunino, Tati Alcántara and Paul Martin.
- A 2012 production in Singapore, directed by Hossan Leong, was staged at the Drama Centre, November 1–16, 2012. The cast included Peter Ong, Seong Hui Xuan, Mina Ellen Kaye, Tan Kheng Hua and Petrina Kow.
- A 2013 production opened in Buenos Aires, Argentina, at Teatro La Comedia. Cast members included Alejandro Paker, Cecilia Milone and Natalia Cociuffo.
- A 2019 production in Slovenia, translated into Slovenian and directed by Nejc Lisjak, opened on September 27, 2019, in the Kulturni Dom in Radomlje. It starred Lisjak as Robert, Anja Strajnar as Joanne, and Špela Prenar as Amy, among others.
- A 2019 production in Brazil, directed by João Fonseca, was staged at the Teatro Sesc Ginástico. It opened on August 30 and closed on September 29.
- A 2019 production in the Philippines, directed by Topper Fabregas, was staged at Maybank Theater, BGC Arts Center. The production starred OJ Mariano as Bobby and Menchu Lauchengco-Yulo, reprising her role as Joanne. The production ran from September 13 to 22.
- A 2021 production in Spain, directed by and starring Antonio Banderas, opened November 17 at Teatro del Soho Caixabank in Málaga, with subsequent (2022) runs at the Teatre Apolo in Barcelona, and the Teatro Albéniz in Madrid. Sondheim reportedly approved Banderas changing Bobby's age from 35 to 50.
- A 2022 production in Poland, directed by Michał Znaniecki and translated into Polish by Maciej Glaza, opened March 26 at Basen Artystyczny in Warsaw.
- A 2022 production in Panama, directed by Jose Alberto Batista, was staged at the Theatre Guild of Ancon in Panama City, running October 18 to 29.

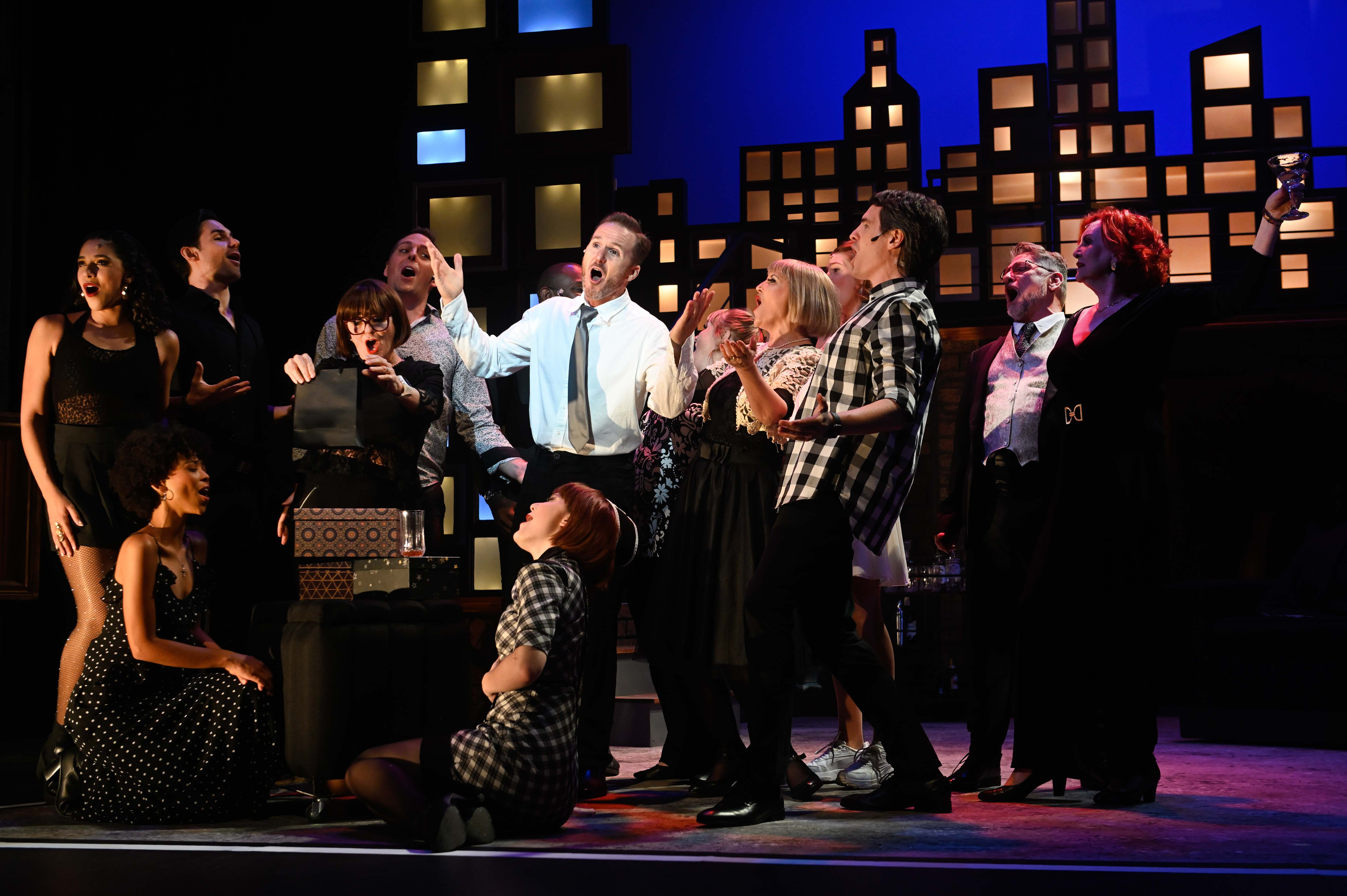
Cast of the South African premiere of Company (2024)

- A 2024 production in South Africa. KickstArt Theatre Productions; director Steven Stead, musical director Roland Perold, choreographer Simone Mann, set design Greg King, lighting design Tina le Roux, sound design Stephanie Pais, costumiere Shanti Naidoo. Cast: Bryan Hiles as Robert, Charon Williams-Ros as Joanne, Peter Court as Larry, Jessica Sole as Amy, Anthony Downing as Paul, Lyle Buxton as Harry, Lisa Bobbert as Sarah, Roland Perold as Peter, Liesl Coppin as Susan, Anne-Marie Clulow as Annie, Yamikani Mahaka-Phiri as David, Roshanda Lewis as Kathy, Keryn Lynne Scott as April & Leah Mari as Marta.
- A 2024 production in Sweden, based on Marianne Elliott's gender-swapped version, directed by Maria Sid and featuring Frida Modén Treichl as Bobbie and Gunilla Backman as Joanne. The translation contains additional minor changes to reference modern technology and social media.

== Recordings ==
The original Broadway cast album features Jones, having been recorded prior to Kert assuming the role of Bobby. When the cast traveled to London to reprise their roles, Columbia Records took Kert into the studio to record new vocal tracks, then mixed out Jones' original vocals. This recording featuring the new Kert vocals laid over the Broadway backing tracks was released as the Original London Cast recording. After Sony Music acquired the Columbia catalogues, a newly remastered CD of the original Broadway cast recording was released in 1998, featuring Kert's rendition of "Being Alive" as a bonus track. The original Broadway cast album was inducted into the Grammy Hall of Fame in 2008.

Selections from the show were broadcast on PBS in 1979 on Musical Comedy Tonight, hosted by Sylvia Fine, with songs performed by Carol Burnett, Richard Chamberlain, Sandy Duncan, and Bernadette Peters.

Revival cast recordings for both the 1995 Broadway and London productions were released; audio recordings also followed the 2006 actor-orchestra Broadway cast, the 2018 gender-swapped London cast, and the 2021 Spanish cast.

Video recordings were released for the 1995 London, 2006 Broadway, and 2011 New York Philharmonic revivals.

== Awards and nominations ==
=== Original Broadway production ===
Year	Award	Category	Nominee	Result
1971	Tony Award	Best Musical		Won
1971	Tony Award	Best Book of a Musical	George Furth	Won
1971	Tony Award	Best Score (music) (Note: For the only time in its history, the Tony Awards for Music and Lyrics were split into two categories. Sondheim won both awards.)	Stephen Sondheim	Won
1971	Tony Award	Best Lyrics	Stephen Sondheim	Won
1971	Tony Award	Best Actor in a Musical	Larry Kert	Nominated
1971	Tony Award	Best Actress in a Musical	Elaine Stritch	Nominated
1971	Tony Award	Best Actress in a Musical	Susan Browning	Nominated
1971	Tony Award	Best Featured Actor in a Musical	Charles Kimbrough	Nominated
1971	Tony Award	Best Featured Actress in a Musical	Barbara Barrie	Nominated
1971	Tony Award	Best Featured Actress in a Musical	Pamela Myers	Nominated
1971	Tony Award	Best Direction of a Musical	Harold Prince	Won
1971	Tony Award	Best Choreography	Michael Bennett	Nominated
1971	Tony Award	Best Scenic Design	Boris Aronson	Won
1971	Tony Award	Best Lighting Design	Robert Ornbo	Nominated
1971	Drama Desk Award	Outstanding Book of a Musical	George Furth	Won
1971	Drama Desk Award	Outstanding Director of a Musical	Harold Prince	Won
1971	Drama Desk Award	Outstanding Lyrics	Stephen Sondheim	Won
1971	Drama Desk Award	Outstanding Music	Stephen Sondheim	Won
1971	Drama Desk Award	Outstanding Set Design	Boris Aronson	Won
1971	Theatre World Award		Susan Browning	Won
1971	New York Drama Critics' Circle Award	Best Musical		Won

=== 1995 Broadway revival ===
Source: Internet Broadway database

Year	Award	Category	Nominee	Result
1996	Tony Award	Best Revival of a Musical		Nominated
1996	Tony Award	Best Featured Actress in a Musical	Veanne Cox	Nominated
1996	Drama Desk Award	Outstanding Featured Actress in a Musical	Veanne Cox	Nominated

=== 1995 London revival ===
Year	Award	Category	Nominee	Result
1996	Laurence Olivier Award	Best Actor in a Leading Role in a Musical	Adrian Lester	Won
1996	Laurence Olivier Award	Best Performance in a Supporting Role in a Musical	Sheila Gish	Won
1996	Laurence Olivier Award	Best Performance in a Supporting Role in a Musical	Sophie Thompson	Nominated
1996	Laurence Olivier Award	Best Director	Sam Mendes	Won

=== 2006 Broadway revival ===
Source: Internet Broadway Database

Year	Award	Category	Nominee	Result
2007	Tony Award	Best Revival of a Musical		Won
2007	Tony Award	Best Actor in a Musical	Raúl Esparza	Nominated
2007	Tony Award	Best Direction of a Musical	John Doyle	Nominated
2007	Drama Desk Award	Outstanding Revival of a Musical		Won
2007	Drama Desk Award	Outstanding Actor in a Musical	Raúl Esparza	Won
2007	Drama Desk Award	Outstanding Featured Actress in a Musical	Barbara Walsh	Nominated
2007	Drama Desk Award	Outstanding Director of a Musical	John Doyle	Nominated
2007	Drama Desk Award	Outstanding Orchestrations	Mary Mitchell Campbell	Won

=== 2018 West End revival ===
Year	Award	Category	Nominee	Result
2018	Evening Standard Theatre Award	Best Musical		Nominated
2018	Evening Standard Theatre Award	Best Musical Performance	Rosalie Craig	Won
2018	Evening Standard Theatre Award	Best Director	Marianne Elliott	Won
2018	Evening Standard Theatre Award	Best Design	Bunny Christie	Nominated
2018	Critics' Circle Theatre Award	Best Musical		Won
2018	Critics' Circle Theatre Award	Best Designer	Bunny Christie	Won
2019	Laurence Olivier Award	Best Musical Revival		Won
2019	Laurence Olivier Award	Best Actress in a Leading Role in a Musical	Rosalie Craig	Nominated
2019	Laurence Olivier Award	Best Actress in a Supporting Role in a Musical	Patti LuPone	Won
2019	Laurence Olivier Award	Best Actor in a Supporting Role in a Musical	Jonathan Bailey	Won
2019	Laurence Olivier Award	Best Actor in a Supporting Role in a Musical	Richard Fleeshman	Nominated
2019	Laurence Olivier Award	Best Director	Marianne Elliott	Nominated
2019	Laurence Olivier Award	Best Set Design	Bunny Christie	Won
2019	Laurence Olivier Award	Best Lighting Design	Neil Austin	Nominated
2019	Laurence Olivier Award	Best Theatre Choreographer	Liam Steel	Nominated
2019	South Bank Sky Arts Award	Theatre		Nominated

=== 2021 Broadway revival ===
Year	Award	Category	Nominee	Result
2022	Tony Awards	Best Revival of a Musical		Won
2022	Tony Awards	Best Direction of a Musical	Marianne Elliott	Won
2022	Tony Awards	Best Performance by a Featured Actor in a Musical	Matt Doyle	Won
2022	Tony Awards	Best Performance by a Featured Actress in a Musical	Patti LuPone	Won
2022	Tony Awards	Best Performance by a Featured Actress in a Musical	Jennifer Simard	Nominated
2022	Tony Awards	Best Scenic Design of a Musical	Bunny Christie	Won
2022	Tony Awards	Best Lighting Design of a Musical	Neil Austin	Nominated
2022	Tony Awards	Best Sound Design of a Musical	Ian Dickinson for Autograph	Nominated
2022	Tony Awards	Best Orchestrations	David Cullen	Nominated
2022	Drama Desk Awards	Outstanding Revival of a Musical		Won
2022	Drama Desk Awards	Outstanding Featured Actor in a Musical	Matt Doyle	Won
2022	Drama Desk Awards	Outstanding Featured Actress in a Musical	Patti LuPone	Won
2022	Drama Desk Awards	Outstanding Featured Actress in a Musical	Jennifer Simard	Nominated
2022	Drama Desk Awards	Outstanding Director of a Musical	Marianne Elliott	Won
2022	Drama Desk Awards	Outstanding Choreography	Liam Steel	Nominated
2022	Drama Desk Awards	Outstanding Scenic Design for a Musical	Bunny Christie	Nominated
2022	Drama Desk Awards	Outstanding Sound Design for a Musical	Ian Dickinson for Autograph	Nominated
2022	Drama League Award	Outstanding Revival of a Musical		Won
2022	Drama League Award	Outstanding Direction of a Musical	Marianne Elliott	Won
2022	Drama League Award	Distinguished Performance Award	Matt Doyle	Nominated
2022	Outer Critics Circle Awards	Outstanding Revival of a Musical (Broadway or Off-Broadway)		Won
2022	Outer Critics Circle Awards	Outstanding Featured Actor in a Musical	Matt Doyle	Won
2022	Outer Critics Circle Awards	Outstanding Featured Actress in a Musical	Patti LuPone	Won

- Due to a performer only being allowed to win the Drama League Award for Distinguished Performance once in their lifetime, LuPone wasn't able to be officially nominated again; she was however given an honorable mention for her work in Company.

== Unproduced film ==
Sondheim approached William Goldman to write a screenplay adaptation of the musical; the director Herbert Ross reportedly talked Sondheim out of doing the film. Speculation arose in 2010 about Neil LaBute working on a film version of the show.
