= Pamela Myers =

American actress

- Born: July 15, 1947 (age 77)
- Education: University of Cincinnati (BFA)
- Occupation: Actress

Pamela Myers (born July 15, 1947, Hamilton, Ohio) is an American actress who made her Broadway debut as Marta in Stephen Sondheim's musical Company, in which she introduced the song "Another Hundred People". She was nominated for a 1971 Tony Award for Best Performance by a Featured Actress in a Musical. In 1975, she appeared in the original San Francisco cast of Snoopy! The Musical.

On television, she appeared as Mitzi the waitress on the Happy Days Season 2 episode "Goin' to Chicago". She was also a main supporting player on the show Sha Na Na (she also did the announcing). She appeared twice on Alice, once playing a tour guide named Bobbi who falls for Mel, and again playing a dental assistant, Ms. Dubro, who sang Broadway songs, rather off-key.

In 1986, she appeared in a production of Sunday in the Park with George as Dot/Marie at the Long Beach Civic Light Opera. In 2002, she appeared in the Broadway revival of Into the Woods as Cinderella's Stepmother and Little Red Ridinghood’s Granny.

She directed a production of Company at Xavier University in Cincinnati, Ohio, which premiered on April 12, 2019.
