= Peter Feaver =

American political scientist

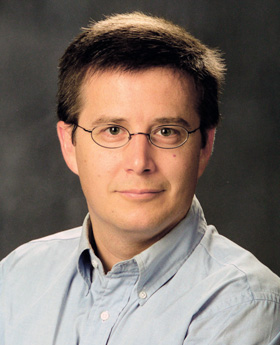
- Feaver in January 2013

Special advisor for strategic planning and institutional reform
- In office 2005–2007
- President: George W. Bush

Director for Defense Policy and Arms Control
- In office 1993–1994
- President: Bill Clinton

Personal details
- Born: December 17, 1961 (age 64) Bethlehem, Pennsylvania, U.S.
- Party: Republican
- Education: Lehigh University; Harvard University

Military service
- Allegiance: United States
- Branch/service: United States Navy; Navy Reserve
- Rank: Lieutenant commander

Peter Douglas Feaver (born December 17, 1961) is an American political scientist. He is currently a professor of political science and public policy at Duke University and a civil-military relations scholar.

Feaver has served as director of the Triangle Institute for Security Studies since 1999, and founded Duke University's Program in American Grand Strategy. He served in the George W. Bush administration, where he served as a special advisor for strategic planning and institutional reform on the National Security Council. Prior to working on the National Security Council of George W. Bush, he served as director for defense policy and arms control at the National Security Council during the Clinton administration. He was also a lieutenant commander in the U.S. Naval Reserve.

== Early life and education ==
Feaver was born in Bethlehem, Pennsylvania. His father was a professor of classics at Lehigh University and later a Youth With a Mission missionary at the University of the Nations. His mother was a homemaker. He graduated from Liberty High School in Bethlehem in 1979.

Feaver attended Lehigh University, where he graduated summa cum laude in international relations in 1983. He obtained a A.M from Harvard University in 1986 and a Ph.D. in political science from Harvard University in 1990. His dissertation at Harvard was "Guarding the Guardians: Civil-Military Relations and the Control of Nuclear Weapons." Samuel Huntington, Ashton Carter, and Joseph Nye were all on his dissertation committee, which Nye chaired.

== Career ==
Feaver's is a professor at Duke University, where he writes on civil-military relations, American foreign policy, American defense policy, nuclear operations, nuclear proliferation, information warfare, and international relations theory. He also served in the administrations of Bill Clinton and George W. Bush and has consulted with various policy think tanks and research organizations. Feaver also co-moderates the Shadow Government Blog of ForeignPolicy.com.

He arrived at Duke University in 1991, received tenure in 1998, was promoted to full professor in 2003, and then was the Alexander F. Hehmeyer Professor of Political Science and Public Policy from 2004 to 2009.

Feaver's government positions include serving on the National Security Council staffs of two different U.S. presidential administrations. He served as the director for defense policy and arms control from 1993 to 1994 under the Bill Clinton administration and was special advisor for strategic planning and institutional reform from 2005 to 2007 under the George W. Bush administration. During his time on Bush's NSC, he was involved in several Iraq strategy reviews, including one that led to the 2007 surge strategy. Feaver is among the national security leaders who signed the March 2, 2016 "Never Trump" open letter.

As a professor, Feaver has been the recipient of several teaching awards. In 2001 he received the Duke Alumni Distinguished Undergraduate Teaching Award. He also received the 1994–1995 Trinity College Distinguished Undergraduate Teaching Award and was nominated for the Trinity College Distinguished Teaching Award for 1992–1993 and 1994–1995. He received the Harvard Certificate of Distinction in Teaching for 1985–1986 and 1986–1987 and a Navy Commendation Medal in 1994. He was a visiting professor of strategic studies at the S. Rajaratnam School of International Studies in 2011.

== Publications ==
Feaver is the author or co-author of five books, including Getting the Best Out of College: A Professor, A Dean, and a Student Tell You How to Maximize Your Experience (2012) ISBN 978-1607741442, Paying the Human Costs of War (2009) ISBN 978-0691139081, Choosing Your Battles: American Civil-Military Relations and the Use of Force (2004) ISBN 978-0691124278, Armed Servants: Agency, Oversight, and Civil-Military Relations (2004) ISBN 978-0674017610, and Guarding the Guardians: Civilian Control of Nuclear Weapons in the United States (1992) ISBN 978-0801426759.

His most recent academic publications or co-publications include "Brass Politics: How Retired Military Officers are Shaping Elections" (November 2012), "Military Campaigns: Veterans Endorsements and Presidential Elections" (October 2012), and "American Grand Strategy At the Crossroads: Leading from the Front, Leading From Behind, or Not Leading at All" (May 2012).

== Personal life ==
Feaver is married with three children and attends Blacknall Presbyterian Church. He sang in the Harvard Din & Tonics from 1984 to 1986.
