= Patricia Ben Peterson =

American actress

- Born: 1959 (age 66–67); Portland, Oregon, U.S.
- Occupations: Actress; social worker
- Partner: David Garrison
- Father: Edwin J. Peterson

Patricia Ben Peterson (born c. 1959) an American Broadway and regional theater actress and geriatric social worker.

== Personal life ==
Patricia Ben Peterson was born in Portland, Oregon, to Portland attorney Edwin and Barbara Lee Peterson. Her father was appointed to the Oregon Supreme Court in 1979, and served as its 39th chief justice from 1983 to 1991. She moved to New York City to study at the Circle in the Square Theatre School and has remained as a resident of New York. Her partner is Tony nominated actor David Garrison.

== Career ==
Patricia Ben enjoyed a successful stage career, making her Broadway debut in 1988 as Cinderella in Stephen Sondheim's Into the Woods directed by James Lapine. Other Broadway roles included standby for Sarah Brown in Guys and Dolls, 1992, directed by Jerry Zaks, (played the role in the 1992-1993 national tour), and Susan in Company at the Roundabout directed by Scott Ellis. She appeared in numerous national tours including Evita, Sweet Charity, directed by Bob Fosse and Urinetown. She originated the role of Teilbele in Yiddle With a Fiddle at Town Hall and Helen Givens in Black No More at the Guthrie Theatre. She was a featured soloist in the 2002 Kennedy Center Honors honoring Elizabeth Taylor. Recordings include Company, Lost in Boston III and Unsung Musicals III.

In the fall of 2003, while still in demand as a performer, but finding that performing was no longer the source of fulfillment it had been for her, she returned to school for two years to earn her master's in geriatric social work.

She lives in New York City, and works as a geriatric social worker for the Actors Fund as the social work supervisor at the Rodney Kirk Center at Manhattan Plaza, which provides affordable housing for performing artists. In July 2007, she was profiled in an article in The New York Times about continuing education and mid-life career changes.
