= Joy Franz =

American actress and singer

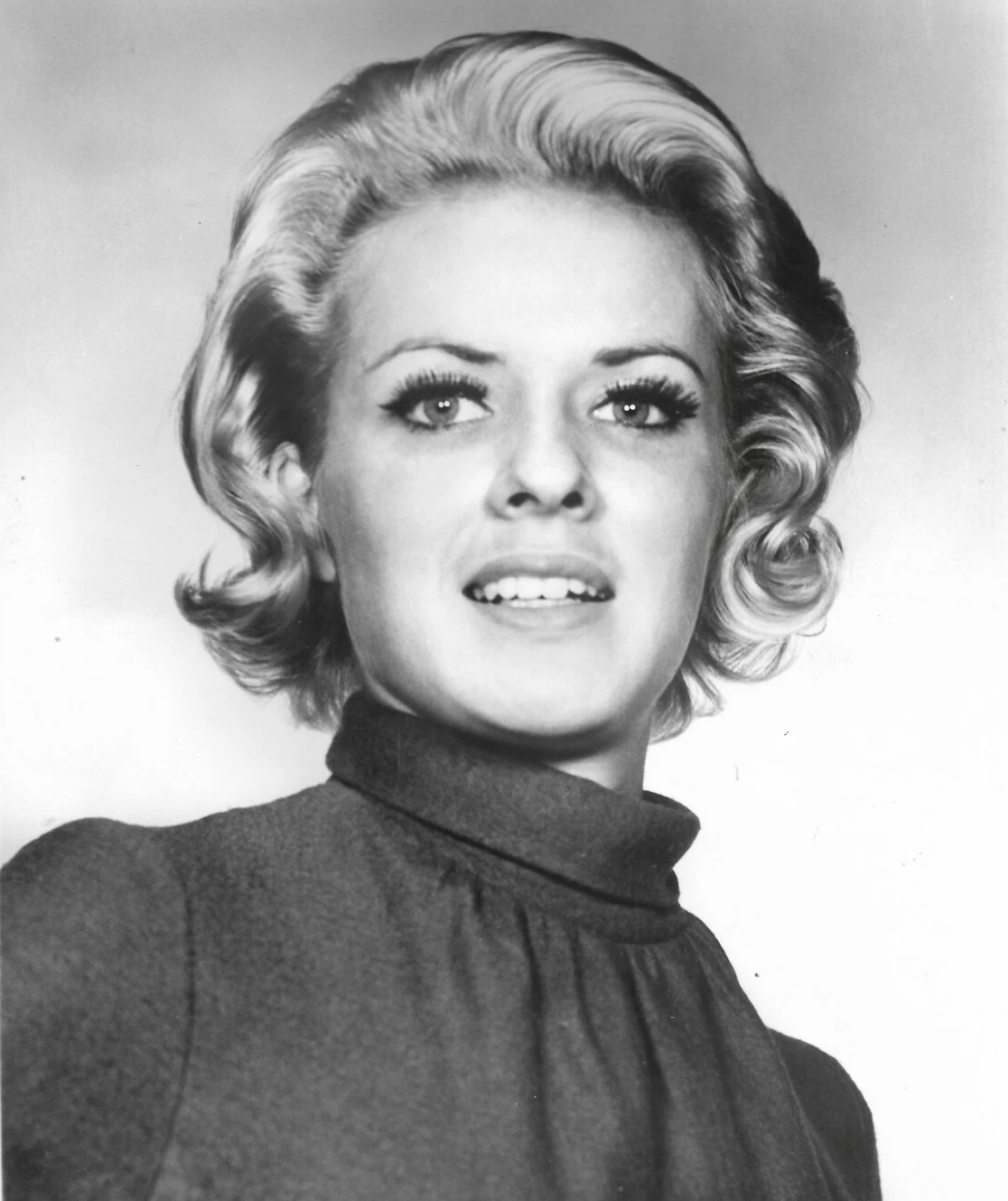
- Franz in 1966
- Born: Maybelle Franz; June 13, 1941 (age 85); Modesto, California, U.S.
- Education: University of Missouri-Kansas City
- Occupations: Theater actress, singer

Joy Franz (born Maybelle Franz; June 13, 1941) is an American actress and singer. She’s best known for her stage work, most notably her roles in Into the Woods. She most recently appeared as the Dowager Empress in US National Tour of Anastasia.

== Early years ==
Franz was born Maybelle Franz on June 13, 1941, in Modesto, California. "Joy" became a nickname used by her friends after a restaurateur said that she was "a joy to have around". She eventually took "Joy" as her professional name. A native of Overland Park, Kansas, she graduated from Shawnee Mission East High School and the University of Missouri-Kansas City (majoring in music). She acted in the Starlight Theatre in Kansas City three summers before she moved to New York.

== Career ==
Franz played Susan in the original 1972 West End production of Stephen Sondheim's Company, and the role of Cinderella's Stepmother in the original 1987 Broadway production of Sondheim's Into the Woods. (She also understudied the role of the Witch). She was also in the ensemble of the 1965 New York City Center production of Guys and Dolls and understudied the female lead Sarah Brown. She also appeared in the Broadway productions of A Little Night Music and Pippin, and the national tours of Company, The Sound of Music, Guys and Dolls, and Damn Yankees.

She reprised her role of Cinderella’s Stepmother in Into the Woods twice. First, in the 1988-90 US Tour, and then again in the 2002 Broadway revival. In the Broadway revival she also played Little Red’s Granny and understudied the role of Jack’s Mother.

She was one of the Street Singers in the world premiere of Leonard Bernstein's Mass at the John F. Kennedy Center for the Performing Arts on September 8, 1971. She currently portrays the role of the Mother in My Damn Channel's television series Horrible People.
