= Vocaldente =

German a cappella quintet

- Origin: Hanover, Germany.
- Genres: A cappella, classical, pop
- Years active: 2004–present
- Members: Benjamin Boresch (since 2014); Tobias "Tobek" Kiel; Robin Koger (since 2025); Lars Unger (since 2023); Tobias Pasternack (since 2006)
- Past members: Arndt Schmöle (bass, 2004-2006); Niklas Turmann (2nd tenor, 2004-2008); Ansgar Pfeiffer (countertenor, 2004-2009); Michael Schöpe (2nd tenor, 2008-2011); Timo Klemm (countertenor, 2009-2011); Johannes Gruber; Tim Ole Jöhnk; Christoph Grasse (countertenor, 2011-2014); Aaron Bredemeier; Jakob Buch (2nd tenor, 2011-2023); Alexander Nolte (baritone, 2014-2018); Mark Forbes (2nd tenor, 2024-2025)
- Website: http://www.vocaldente.org

vocaldente are an a cappella quintet from Hanover, Germany.

== History ==
vocaldente were founded in 2004 by five singers - Tobias "Tobek" Kiel (1st tenor), Johannes "Johnny" Gruber (baritone / mouth percussion) Niklas Turmann (2nd tenor), Ansgar Pfeiffer (countertenor), and Arndt Schmöle (bass). The group primarily emerged from the Knabenchor Hannover (Hanover Boys Choir) and the Hanover University of Music and Drama. Their line-up has been altered several times as various members retire or leave for other musical ventures. As of 2026, the group consists of Benjamin Boresch (countertenor), Robin Koger (2nd tenor), Lars Unger (baritone), and Tobias Pasternack (né Wunschik) (bass), with Tobias Kiel (1st tenor) as the last remaining founding member.

The ensemble began by building their support base locally and then began to perform across Germany. By 2007, they were frequently undertaking foreign tours, most notably to the United States and Southeast Asia, where they've been continuously building up a loyal and enthused following of fans ever since. In 2007 and 2008, they won first prizes at several renowned international A cappella competitions such as the Tampereen Sävel Contest for Vocal Ensembles in Finland and the Harmony Sweepstakes A Cappella Festival in the U.S.

The band performed a special concert in the Balver Caves in 2009, celebrating the 5th anniversary of their formation.

== Influences ==
Due to their varied musical backgrounds and instrumental professions, vocaldente cite many different musical influences. As a vocal group, they're most notably influenced by pioneering British a cappella ensemble the King's Singers, in whose workshops at the Schleswig-Holstein Musik Festival they've already participated twice, where they received positive remarks from members of the King's Singers.

== Repertoire ==
The ensemble performs a varied catalogue of popular songs covering contemporary and modern music from the past 100 years, as well as its own compositions. All songs are arranged by members of the group themselves. When performing, vocaldente put great emphasis on singing acoustically without technical aids or microphones, showcasing the group's focus on "a cappella art”.

== Workshop ==
In the last few years, vocaldente has dedicated more time to pedagogical work with children, teens, and adults, individuals and ensembles, school classes and choirs. They have partnered with alumni from the Hochschule für Musik, Theater, und Medien Hannover, the Hochschule für Musik und Theater Leipzig, and Universität Hildesheim in the fields of High School instruction for music, culture.

The professional vocal ensemble represents a major interest in the natural art of creating music: singing in a group without amplification or technological tricks – working solely with the sound of human voices.

vocaldente has, over the past few years, developed different concepts for workshops based on various themes such as voice, vocal sound, phrasing, breath technique, group and choir singing, rhythm and voice, instrumental imitation, mouth percussion, intonation, blending, groove, staging/stagecraft, presentation, microphones, and marketing. The emphasis of these hands-on courses lies, depending on the workshop group, from the basic goals, such as the discovery of the voice as an instrument, singing together as an ensemble, up to complex material like layered patterns, group sound, and polishing the performance art.

== Discography ==
All recordings are released independently by vocaldente, and are only sold through their official website or at their concerts. The group recorded all in studios in Hanover, Germany.

Albums

- "Let’s Misbehave" (2006)
- "gold 'n' delicious" (2009)
- "Life Is A Highway" (2016)
- "In The Air" (2020)

Singles

- "...dann ist Sommer" (2007)

DVDs

- "Live at Balver Caves" (scheduled for release in Autumn 2009)

== Awards ==
- 1st Prize - Tampereen Sävel 2007 (Tampere, Finland)
- 1st Prize - Harmony Sweepstakes A Cappella Festival 2008 (San Francisco, USA)
- 1st Prize - Taiwan International Contemporary A Cappella Competition 2008 (Taipei)
