= Wharton Follies =

- Wharton Follies Logo
- Formation: 1977
- Purpose: Musical theater Satire; Variety show Sketch comedy
- Location: Philadelphia, PA
- Affiliations: Wharton School

Wharton Follies is a student organization in the MBA program at the Wharton School of the University of Pennsylvania that puts on an annual amateur musical theater production. Started in 1977, it is both one of the largest clubs and highest profile organizations at Wharton, staging one of the largest productions of its kind at any professional school. Over the years, Follies has been transformed into a Broadway-level production boasting a six-figure budget and with successive producers and directors building on their predecessor's accomplishments. Follies typically features prominent members of the administration (e.g., dean, vice dean, and admissions director), popular faculty members, and classmates. The show typically makes fun of the Wharton experience, other business schools, and students who have made a name for themselves. One student said that part of the appeal of Follies is that it “show[s] off student talent that you wouldn't otherwise be able to witness.”

== Follies Videos ==
In addition to a live stage show featuring the school's most talented students, Follies writes, shoots, and edits its own Saturday Night Live-style video features for public consumption. The videos treat typical business school topics in a humorous fashion. Recent topics have included "The Evolution of an MBA," "Drunken Case History," "MBAs Assemble a Malm Bed," "Jawn of the Dead," and "Professors Read Mean Reviews." The last, which is a take on Jimmy Kimmel Live's "Celebrities Read Mean Tweets," is especially notable, with over 200,000 views.

== Past Performances ==
- 2026 Til Debt Do Us Part
- 2025 Once Upon an MBA
- 2024 Dial M for MGMT
- 2023 21 Walnut Street
- 2022 Follies' 11
- 2021 Wizard of Lolz
- 2020 Follies Angels
- 2018 WTV: Wharton Network
- 2017 Saved by the Follies
- 2016 Back to the Follies (40th Annual Wharton Follies)
- 2015 The Huntsman Hangover
- 2014 The Book of Wharton
- 2013 It's a Whartonful Life
- 2012 How to Succeed in Business School Without Really Trying
- 2011 Assets and Liabilities: The Parable of Your Personal Brand
- 2010 The 34th Annual Follies Awards: It's a Dishonor Just to be Nominated
- 2009 The Trojan Wharton: A Greek Comedy About a Financial Tragedy
- 2008 A Midsemester Night's Dream
- 2007 D’Anjani Code
- 2006 Springtime for Harker
- 2005 Fast Times at Huntsman High
- 2004 Whatchu Talkin’ Bout Anjani?
- 2003 Dial 5 For Wharton
- 2002 Crouching Market Hidden Offer
- 2001 All's Fair in Love and Wharton
- 2000 The VC Who Loved Me... A Dotcomedy
- 1999 There's Something About Gerrity
- 1998 Hey! Get Your Hands Outta My Vance!
- 1997 The Trea$ury Hunt
- 1996 Mission Improbable
- 1995 Heaven Can Waitlist
- 1994 As Wharton Turns
- 1993 CLUEless, or Death of a Curriculum
- 1992 The Wharton Television Network
- 1991 Alice in Whartonland
- 1990 Willy Wharton and the MBA Factory
- 1989 Follies the Thirteenth
- 1988 Between the Balance Sheets
- 1987 Publish and Perish
- 1986 Yield to Maturity
- 1985 Retained Yearnings
- 1984 Big Deal: A Dramatic Offering
- 1983 ET – The Economy's Terrible
- 1982 Pirates of Penn Vance
- 1981 Ain’t Calculatin’
- 1980 Vancin’
- 1979 Shall We Vance?
- 1978 Harry, Is This Wharton?
- 1977 A Placement Line
