= Multiple careers =

Working 2 or more jobs

Having multiple careers is the growing trend in the late 20th century and early 21st century whereas a career comprises the work activities that can be identified with a particular job or profession. These multiple careers can either be concurrent (where a worker has two simultaneous careers) or sequential (where a worker adopts a new career after having worked for some time in another career). Both may occur for different reasons.

Sandra Kerka (2003) reports that "'studies in the United States at the end of the seventies already showed that between 10 and 30 percent of the economically active population had experienced at least one career change in a 5-year period' (Teixeria & Gomes, 2000, p. 78). Of 91 skilled young adults in Germany, only one-third had continuous careers in the first 8 years after graduation and over half were employed in other occupations at least once (Heinz 2002). The phenomenon of reverse transfer provides an indirect clue: Townsend (2003) found that 62% of bachelor's-degree holders who enroll in community colleges were seeking an associate degree or certificate in order to make a career change."

== Concurrent multiple careers ==
Workers with concurrent multiple careers adopt a "hyphenated" professional identity. A "teacher-painter" might refer to an individual who works for nine months out of the year as an Elementary School Teacher and three (summer) months out of the year as a painter. A "doctor-potter" might refer to an individual who works as an ENT-physician during the day, but works within a ceramics studio at night. Some consider the hyphen "-homemaker" or "-caregiver" as suggestive of another type of concurrent multiple career worker. That is, a "lawyer-homemaker" works as attorney and is also in charge of domestic duties at home. Increasingly, as adults must care for younger generation children and older generation parents, the "X-caregiver" worker has emerged — where a worker completes the tasks of career-X and simultaneously cares for the needs of children and elders. Some note that many members of the working class have long been concurrent workers out of economic necessity. A quarter of the British workforce works like this.

Workers can adopt concurrent multiple careers for a host of reasons including: economic (such as poverty or striving for additional wealth), educational (such as multiple degrees in multiple fields), or personal (such as interest or lack of fulfillment in one career). Economist, Richard Florida, among others suggests that some "hyphenates" pursue multiple concurrent careers in order to fulfill creative needs. A "doctor-potter," for example, might pursue ceramics for creative fulfillment as well as profit and professional development.

== Sequential multiple careers (smc) ==
Workers with sequential multiple careers adopt a changing professional identity over time. Thus, a worker may devote 10–20 years of his/her life to one career and then switch to a related career or an entirely new one. As life-expectancy increases, as retirement benefits decrease, and as educational opportunities expand — workers may increasingly find themselves forced to fulfill the goals of one career and then adopt another. Some view this as an opportunity to expand meaning and purpose into later life, while others see this trend as an unfortunate economic and social reality.
