= Janel Mueller =

American academic

Janel Mueller (November 26, 1938 – October 21, 2022) was an American academic.

She was the William Rainey Harper Distinguished Service Professor Emerita in English Language & Literature and the college at University of Chicago and was the Dean of the Division of Humanities from 1999 to 2004. In 1982, she received the Quantrell Award. She was an expert on the writings of Catherine Parr, the first woman to publish under her own name in English, including Psalms or Prayers, Prayers or Meditations and The Lamentation of a Sinner. In 1972, she was awarded the Guggenheim Fellowship. She is the co-editor of four volumes of the writings of Elizabeth I, all published by the University of Chicago Press.

She earned degrees from Augustana College (BA) and Harvard University (PhD).
