= Queen's Gambit (disambiguation) =

The Queen's Gambit is a chess opening.

Queen's Gambit may also refer to:

== Novel ==
- The Queen's Gambit (novel), 1983, by Walter Tevis, later developed into the 2020 Netflix miniseries
- Queen's Gambit, a 2013 novel by English novelist Elizabeth Fremantle, later adapted into the Firebrand (2023 film)

== Television ==
- The Queen's Gambit (miniseries), a 2020 Netflix adaptation of the Walter Tevis novel

=== Episodes ===
- "Queen's Gambit" (Assignment Vienna)
- "Queen's Gambit" (Boon)
- "Queen's Gambit" (Captain Harlock and the Queen of a Thousand Years)
- "Queen's Gambit" (Falcon Crest)
- "Queen's Gambit" (Holby City)
- "Queen's Gambit" (Hotel)
- "Queen's Gambit" (The New Adventures of He-Man)
- "Queen's Gambit" (Terminator: The Sarah Connor Chronicles)

== Other uses ==
- The Queen's Gambit (Arrowverse), a yacht in the superhero franchise
- Queen's Gambit, a 2016 Indian short film by Sayantan Ghosal
