= Long Day's Journey into Night (2025 film) =

Long Day's Journey Into Night
- Theatrical release poster
- Directed by: Jonathan Kent
- Written by: David Lindsay-Abaire
- Based on: Long Day's Journey into Night (1956 play) by Eugene O'Neill
- Produced by: Carolyn Marks Blackwood; Gleb Fetisov; Bill Kenwright; Redmond Morris; Gabrielle Tana
- Starring: Jessica Lange; Ed Harris; Ben Foster; Colin Morgan
- Cinematography: Mark Wolf
- Edited by: Jon Harris
- Music by: Ilan Eshkeri
- Production companies: Magnolia Mae Films; BK Studios; Brouhaha Entertainment; Fetisoff Illusion; Four Provinces Films
- Distributed by: Quiver Distribution
- Release dates: February 27, 2025 (Dublin); September 25, 2026 (United States)
- Running time: 109 minutes
- Countries: United States; United Kingdom; Australia; Ireland
- Language: English

Long Day's Journey Into Night is a 2025 drama film directed by Jonathan Kent in his feature directorial debut, and adapted by David Lindsay-Abaire from Eugene O'Neill's 1956 play. It stars Jessica Lange, Ed Harris, Ben Foster, and Colin Morgan. It is the third theatrical film version of the play, following a 1962 American film and a 1996 Canadian film.

The film was an international co-production between the United States, United Kingdom, Ireland and Australia, and was filmed at Ardmore Studios in the fall of 2022. It premiered at the Dublin International Film Festival on February 27, 2025. The film was released on September 25, 2026.

== Premise ==
Over the course of a day, a married couple, Mary and James Tyrone, and their two sons, Jamie and Edmund, grapple with Mary's morphine addiction and confront each other over the past in a series of emotionally tense and volatile exchanges.

== Cast ==
- Jessica Lange as Mary Tyrone
- Ed Harris as James Tyrone
- Ben Foster as Jamie Tyrone
- Colin Morgan as Edmund Tyrone
- Ericka Roe as Cathleen

== Production ==
Filming began in Ireland in September 2022, at Ardmore Studios in County Wicklow. Lange confirmed in a May 2024 interview with People that the film was "finally finished." In February 2025, Blue Fox Entertainment acquired international sales rights to the film, which would be shopped for buyers at the European Film Market, while UTA Independent Film Group handled North American rights.

== Release ==
Long Day's Journey into Night premiered at the Dublin Film Festival on February 27, 2025. Quiver Distribution later acquired the film and it was released on September 25, 2026.

== Reception ==
Jessica Lange has received widespread critical acclaim for her portrayal. Ross McIndoe of Slant Magazine awarded the film three stars out of four.

Nikki Baughan of Screen International gave the film a positive review and wrote, "The cast and material alone are sufficient to attract upscale audiences, but this is a strong adaptation in and of itself."

=== Accolades ===
Award	Date of ceremony	Category	Recipient(s)	Result
Newport Beach Film Festival	18 October 2026	Icon Award	Jessica Lange	Won
Dublin International Film Festival	27 February 2025	Career Achievement Award	Jessica Lange	Won
Dublin International Film Festival	27 February 2025	Career Achievement Award	Ed Harris	Won
Savannah Film Festival	31 October 2026	Lifetime Achievement Award	Jessica Lange	Won
Chelsea Film Festival	15 October 2026	Icon Award	Jessica Lange	Won
Virginia Film Festival	23 October 2026	Visionary Award	Jessica Lange	Won
Sun Valley Film Festival	02 December 2026	Vision Award	Jessica Lange	Won
