= Jo Foster =

English stage actor

- Born: June 1999 (age 27); Bolton
- Education: Arts Educational Schools
- Years active: 2021–present

Jo Foster (formerly Joe Foster, born 1999) is an English actor known for their roles on the West End stages. They (Note: Foster uses they/them pronouns.) are best known for originating the role of Oliver in the musical Why Am I So Single?

Their accolades include nominations for a Laurence Olivier Award and a WhatsOnStage Award.

== Early life and education ==
Foster grew up in Bolton, where they started taking acting lessons at the age of eight as a hobby where they said it helped them develop lifelong friendships. They also grew up on films such as Annie, Chitty Chitty Bang Bang and Oliver!, which helped inspire them to become a performer.

They graduated in musical theatre from the Arts Educational Schools in Chiswick in 2021.

== Career ==
Foster's first role after graduating was in the cast of Luke Sheppard's Rent at the Hope Mill Theatre as featured ensemble in 2021. Also in the cast Alex Thomas-Smith as Angel, Luke Bayer as Mark, Jocasta Almgill as Joanne, Maiya Quansah-Breed as Mimi & Tom Francis as Roger.

In the same year Foster was then part of the cast of the musical Hex at the National Theatre in 2021-2022, with Rosalie Craig, Tamsin Carroll and Delroy Atkinson.

In summer 2022, they joined the Regent’s Park Open Air Theatre production of Legally Blonde, directed by Lucy Moss, as ensemble/cover Bruiser. The production starred Courtney Bowman as Elle Woods, Michael Ahomka-Lindsay as Emmett, Grace Mouat as Pilar and Lauren Drew as Brooke.

In the same year, Foster made their West End debut as May in & Juliet at the Shaftesbury Theatre. They later starred in the World premiere production of Just for One Day at The Old Vic in January 2024.

Foster originated the co-lead role of Oliver in the musical Why Am I So Single? at the Garrick Theatre in 2024, which earned them acclaim for their performance and a WhatsOnStage Award nomination for Best Performer in a Musical. Following the show’s closure in January 2025, Foster went on to make a limited week-only appearance in The Frogs at Southwark Playhouse as Pluto and starred in a revival of Four Play at the King’s Head Theatre in the summer of 2025.

Foster played Jack in the 2025 London revival of Into the Woods at the Bridge Theatre, where they received a nomination for Best Supporting Actor in a Musical at the 2026 Laurence Olivier Awards. Foster performed the song Giants in the Sky for the show’s performance at the Laurence Olivier Awards. They were set to reprise the role of Jack in the upcoming West End transfer at the Noël Coward Theatre in September 2026, but had to withdraw from the production due to scheduling conflicts, with the role of Jack being taken over by Keith Ramsay.

== Stage credits ==
Year(s)	Production	Role	Location	Category	Ref.	Notes
2021	Rent	Ensemble	Hope Mill Theatre	Regional		
2021-2022	Hex	Prince Scott / Thorn	National Theatre	Off West End		
2022	Legally Blonde	Ensemble/Understudy Bruiser	Regent's Park Open Air Theatre	Off West End		
2022-2023	& Juliet	May	Shaftesbury Theatre	West End		Final project credited as Joe Foster
2024	Just For One Day: The Live Aid Musical	Bernie	The Old Vic	Off West End		First project credited as Jo Foster
2024-2025	Why Am I So Single?	Oliver	Garrick Theatre	West End		
2025	The Frogs	Pluto	Southwark Playhouse	Off West End		One week only guest appearance
2025	Four Play	Andy	King’s Head Theatre	Off West End		
2025-2026	Into The Woods	Jack	Bridge Theatre	Off West End		

== Awards and nominations ==
Year	Work	Award	Category	Result	Ref.
2025	Why Am I So Single?	WhatsOnStage Awards	Best Performer in a Musical	Nominated	
2026	Into the Woods	Laurence Olivier Awards	Best Actor in a Supporting Role in a Musical	Nominated	

== Personal life ==
Jo is non-binary and uses they/them pronouns and also suffers with hearing loss in one ear. They said in a podcast interview that they attended therapy sessions after training at drama school as they felt a lot of their identity became lost within the training programme and that starring in their first professional show Rent amongst actors such as Tom Francis and Iz Hesketh helped them with their gender identity to identify as non-binary.
