= Conversion narrative =

Narrative about converting to a religion

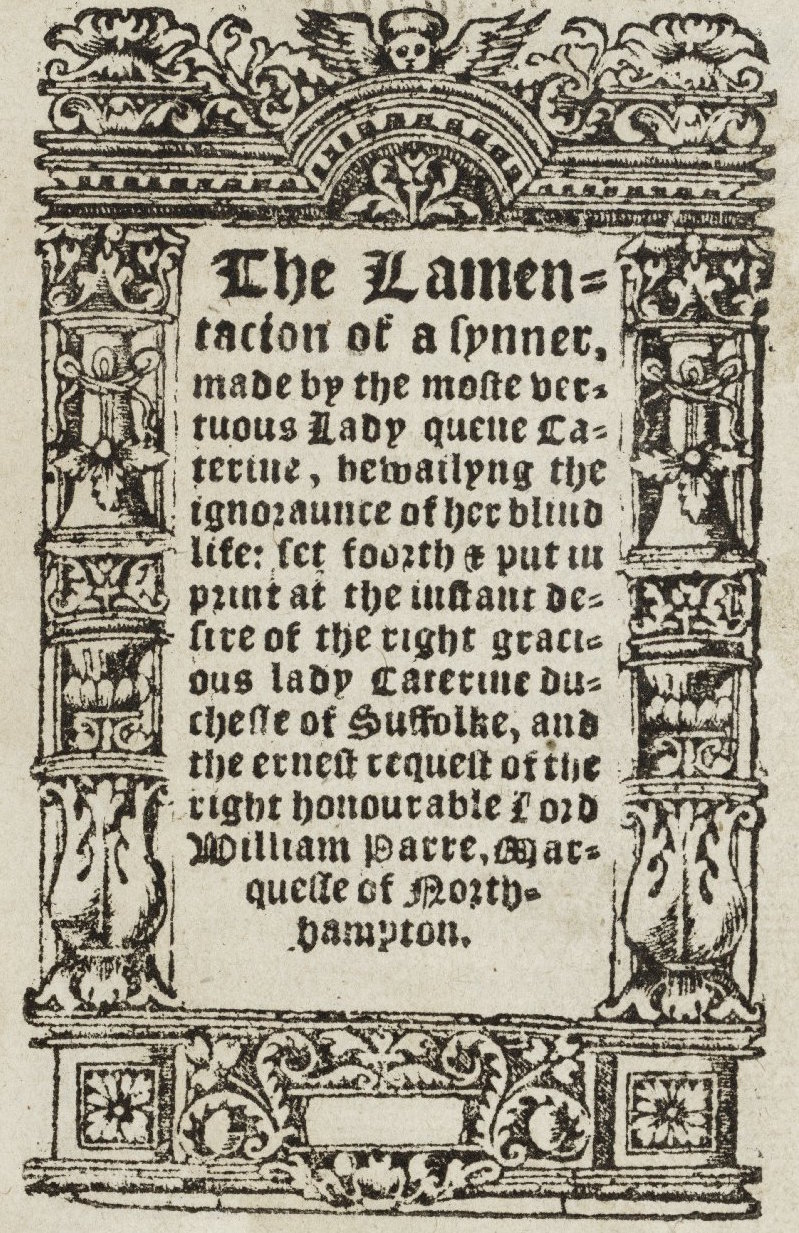
The Lamentation of a Sinner by Queen Catherine Parr of England, an early example of a protestant conversion narrative

Broadly speaking, a conversion narrative is a narrative that relates the operation of conversion, usually religious. As a specific aspect of American literary and religious history, the conversion narrative was an important facet of Puritan sacred and secular society in New England during a period stretching roughly from 1630 to the end of the First Great Awakening.

== Definition ==
As defined by Patricia Caldwell, the conversion narrative was "a testimony of personal religious experience…spoken or read aloud to the entire congregation of a gathered church before admission as evidence of the applicant's visible sainthood" Edmund S. Morgan describes the typical "morphology of conversion" related in the conversion narrative as involving the stages of "knowledge, conviction, faith, combat, and true, imperfect assurance."

== In Puritan New England ==
The conversion narrative was one of the distinguishing features of the Massachusetts Puritan churches; the relation of a conversion narrative emphasized their belief in "faith as the essence of the church: and they were to ensure the presence of faith in their members by a screening process that included narratives of religious experiences." In adopting this requirement for membership, Bremer argues that the New England churches were extending the beliefs of their English brethren that "admission to the communion table should be limited to those with saving faith." As Morgan goes on to point out, the adaptation of the conversion narrative as a requirement for church membership "was as important politically as religiously, for it altered not only the character of church membership but the character of freemanship." Freemanship was restricted to church members and with the adaptation of this requirement for church membership, given the force of law with an act by the General Court in 1636, "the new system of church membership may be said to have reached full definition, legal establishment, and coordination with the civil government in Massachusetts"

A key figure in the development and adaptation of the conversion narrative to the New England Puritan churches was John Cotton.
