= Elizabeth Fremantle =

English novelist

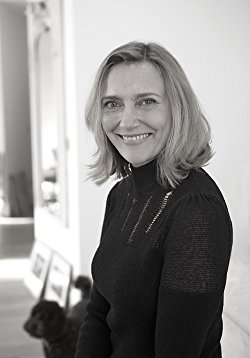
- Fremantle in 2017
- Born: 1962 (age 63–64); London, England, United Kingdom
- Education: Birkbeck, University of London (BA)
- Occupation: Writer
- Writing career
- Pen name: EC Fremantle
- Language: English

Elizabeth Fremantle (born 1962) is an English novelist. Her published works include Queen's Gambit (2013), The Girl in the Glass Tower (2016) and the critically acclaimed thriller The Poison Bed (2018). In 2024, a revised edition of Queen's Gambit was published as Firebrand to mark the release of the novel's adaptation into a major motion picture, starring Alicia Vikander as Katherine Parr and Jude Law as Henry VIII.

Fremantle's themes of women and power and are linked by her interest in exploring the invisibility of early modern women's lives. She was described by The Bookseller in 2013 as ‘a major new voice in historical fiction’ and People Magazine called her ‘a brilliant new player in the court of royal fiction.’ Fremantle is the 5x great-granddaughter of diarist Elizabeth Wynne Fremantle and Thomas Fremantle, the latter of whom was a close associate of Horatio Nelson.

== Early life ==
Elizabeth Fremantle was born in London and spent her early years in Hampstead, North London.

== Early career ==
After leaving school aged sixteen, Fremantle worked in a variety of jobs before embarking on a career in journalism. She worked as a fashion editor for ELLE UK followed by British Vogue and then in France for Vogue Paris.

In the 1990s, Fremantle attended Birkbeck, University of London as a mature student, gaining a first-class BA in English Literature and the prize for English, followed by a master's in Creative Writing.

== Literary career ==
Fremantle has published six Tudor and Jacobean set novels with Michael Joseph, an imprint of Penguin Random House UK. Her first three novels are published by Simon & Schuster in the United States. Her eighth, most recent, book Sinners (2025) is also published by Michael Joseph. The novel is set in 16th-century Rome, and tells the true and tragic tale of Beatrice Cenci.

Fremantle's seventh novel, Disobedient (2023) is also set in pre-modern Italy. Disobedient is a feminist retelling of the story Artemisia Gentileschi. The book was described by publisher Jillian Taylor as "a tour-de-force of historical fiction, with a complex, deeply inspiring heroine at its heart". The novel was the winner of the Historical Writers' Association Gild Crown 2024, who described Disobedient as "masterful... a brilliant example of the power of historical fiction."

Fremantle's novels explore and celebrate the lives of women who are often overlooked by history. Her first novel, Queen’s Gambit, focuses on the life of Henry VIII of England's last wife, Catherine Parr. Writing for The Guardian, Stevie Davis finds that, "Katherine [Parr] emerges from Queen's Gambit as sympathetic, humorous and resourceful."

Fremantle's second novel, Sisters of Treason, explores the story of the younger sisters of Lady Jane Grey (Mary and Elizabeth) and her third Watch the Lady tells of Penelope Devereux (Penelope Blount, Countess of Devonshire) – sister of the doomed Earl of Essex (Robert Devereux) who was labelled by James I of England ‘a fair woman with a black soul.’ These three books are marketed as "The Tudor trilogy".

Fremantle's fourth novel, The Girl in the Glass Tower is about Lady Arbella Stuart, who was for a time the presumed heir to Elizabeth I of England. Her fifth novel, a Jacobean psychological thriller, The Poison Bed, was published in 2018. Her sixth novel, The Honey and the Sting is a domestic thriller about three sisters trying to outrun the danger from a family secret. Her work has been translated into ten languages.

Fremantle is a committee member of the Historical Writers' Association and was co-founder of their online magazine Historia. She has had work published in various other publications, including Vanity Fair, The Sunday Times, The Wall Street Journal and the Financial Times and occasionally reviews fiction for the Sunday Express. Elizabeth Fremantle chaired the judging panel for the HWA Gold Crown 2018, an award for historical novel of the year.

=== Adaptations ===
The film rights to Queen's Gambit was acquired by Baby Cow Productions. The feature film was directed by Karim Aïnouz and produced by Gabrielle Tana at Magnolia Mae productions and Brouhaha Entertainment. Firebrand premiered at Cannes Film Festival to a standing ovation. In the United Kingdom, the film is distributed by MetFilm Distribution.

== List of works ==
- Sinners (2025) ISBN 9780241705162
- Firebrand (2024) ISBN 9781405965842
- Disobedient (2023) ISBN 978-0241583043
- The Honey and the Sting (2020) ISBN 978-0718180508
- The Poison Bed (2018) ISBN 9781405920087
- The Girl in the Glass Tower (2016) ISBN 978-0718180461
- Watch the Lady (2015) ISBN 978-1405909440
- Sisters of Treason (2014) ISBN 978-1405909402
- Queen's Gambit (2013) ISBN 9781405909389
