= A Talent for Murder (2026 film) =

2026 film by Anton Corbijn

- Theatrical release poster
- Directed by: Anton Corbijn
- Screenplay by: Joanna Murray-Smith
- Based on: Switzerland by Joanna Murray-Smith
- Produced by: Gabrielle Tana; Carolyn Marks Blackwood; Pete Shilaimon; Mickey Liddell; Troy Lum; Andrew Mason; Jim Robison; Kurt Martin; Karl Spoerri; Joseph Yakob; Andrea Occhipinti
- Starring: Helen Mirren; Alden Ehrenreich; Olivia Cooke; Juliet Stevenson
- Cinematography: Robbie Ryan
- Edited by: Andrew Hulme
- Music by: Dickon Hinchliffe
- Production companies: LD Entertainment; Brouhaha Entertainment; FilmNation Entertainment; Lunar Pictures; Zurich Avenue; Lucky Red
- Distributed by: Bleecker Street; LD Entertainment (United States); Lucky Red (Italy); Universal Pictures; Focus Features (United Kingdom)
- Release dates: September 14, 2026 (TIFF); October 23, 2026 (United States); November 20, 2026 (United Kingdom); November 26, 2026 (Italy)
- Running time: 106 minutes
- Countries: United States; United Kingdom; Switzerland; Italy
- Language: English
- Box office: $1.2 million

A Talent for Murder is a 2026 thriller film about acclaimed novelist Patricia Highsmith, directed by Anton Corbijn and adapted by Joanna Murray-Smith from her 2014 play Switzerland. It stars Helen Mirren, Alden Ehrenreich and Olivia Cooke. The film was released theatrically in the United States on October 23, 2026, by Bleecker Street and LD Entertainment. It received generally positive reviews from critics.

== Plot ==
In 1995, American literary editor Edward Ridgeway travels to Switzerland in the hopes of convincing author Patricia Highsmith to write a sixth book featuring her famed character Tom Ripley. His predecessor in the task, Bradley Appleby, has disappeared, believed by Edward’s bosses to be suffering a psychotic episode. While on the train to Tegna, he meets Clementine Balfour, a fellow American and wealthy young woman who is visiting family in Europe. During a taxi ride to Highsmith’s house, the driver unnerves him by telling stories of Highsmith allegedly killing a dog, and a man that may have been Appleby running down the road in pajamas in the middle of the night.

Upon his arrival, Edward meets Patricia, finding her eccentric, confrontational, and very opposed to writing another book about Tom Ripley, whom she says is ‘always in her company.’ Edward slowly earns her interest and respect, revealing his knowledge of her work, his lower-class upbringing, and that he is an orphan. He also delivers her supplies, including an ornate hunting knife for her extensive collection of weapons. She reluctantly agrees to allow him to stay for one night, and to assist her with plotting a new book, but refuses to sign a contract agreeing to write the book until she is satisfied with their work. Later that night, Edward awakes with blood on his neck, possibly from a cut made by a knife, which he suspects is from Patricia. In the morning, she implies his breakfast may be poisoned with arsenic, but reveals it as another game, part of her fascination with murder.

They begin to discuss an idea for the book: Tom Ripley is in Rome, where he meets a young American socialite. Edward, reminded of Clementine, uses her and her family as inspiration. (Note: Alden Ehrenreich, who portrays Edward Ridgeway, also portrays Tom Ripley in the imagined events of the book. Other characters in the story, such as Clementine and her great-aunt, are played by the same actors as their counterparts that Edward draws inspiration from.) They weave a story of Ripley meeting, seducing, and eventually marrying Clementine, then killing her grandfather in order to get closer to the trust fund that awaits her.

Pleased, Patricia sends Edward out of the house, ordering him to devise Ripley's murder method for Clementine’s great-aunt Peggy in exchange for signing the contract. While walking in town, Edward has a chance meeting with Clementine, who invites him to a high-society party thrown by the real Aunt Peggy, who owns a vacation home near Tegna. At the party, one of Peggy’s friends, Kathryn, commiserates with Edward, revealing that she also has a lower-class upbringing, and encourages him to be bold enough to ‘reinvent’ himself.

Returning to Patricia’s house, the two have a combative conversation: Patricia accuses Edward of being homosexual and timid, while he lambastes her for failing to top The Talented Mr. Ripley and descending into drunkenness in Switzerland. Desiring to be bold, Edward takes the knife he brought Patricia, breaks into Clementine’s bedroom, and has aggressive sex with her.

Patricia and Edward continue with the Ripley story: Tom and Clementine travel to Switzerland to visit Aunt Peggy, where Tom feigns illness, then secretly travels to Peggy’s mansion. Details of the real Peggy’s house, such as a Fabergé egg and a dog named Tolstoy, bleed into the narrative. After Tom lets Tolstoy run away from the house, Peggy anxiously returns home to look for him, where he stabs her with a knife identical to Patricia’s.

An impressed Patricia signs the contract for the book, after which Edward reveals he knows it will be her final work, as she is dying; furious, she shoots at him with a pistol from her collection. The next morning, Patricia awakes to find Edward sitting with her. She asks him how he killed his parents, and Edward’s appearance morphs between his own and Tom’s as he tells the story of how he cut the brakes on his parents’ car, causing them to die in a car crash. Patricia envisions him stabbing her with her knife and leaving her to die. On the train, Edward meets Clementine again. She laments not receiving her inheritance from Aunt Peggy; Edward removes his glasses, causing him to resemble Tom, as he tells her he would be able to get the money. Back at her home, Patricia contemplates Tom Ripley ‘leaving’ her to live his own life.

== Cast ==
- Helen Mirren as Patricia Highsmith
- Alden Ehrenreich as:
  - Edward Ridgeway, a young literary editor for a New York publishing house
  - Tom Ripley, a young con artist and art collector based in Rome
- Olivia Cooke as Clementine Balfour, a young American heiress and Edward's love interest
- Juliet Stevenson as Peggy, Clementine's aunt

== Production ==
It was announced in April 2023 that Helen Mirren was set to star in the film Switzerland, adapted by Joanna Murray-Smith from her 2014 play with Anton Corbijn serving as director. In March 2024, Alden Ehrenreich joined the cast, with Olivia Cooke and Juliet Stevenson added in January 2025.

Principal photography began in Rome in January 2025, with production also occurring in London and Switzerland.

== Release ==
In June 2026, it was announced that co-producer LD Entertainment would be partnering with Bleecker Street on the American release of the film, now retitled A Talent for Murder, planning to release it sometime in fourth quarter that year.

The film premiered at the 2026 Toronto International Film Festival, with a theatrical release in the United States scheduled for October 23, 2026. It will be presented in the Grand public section of the 21st Rome Film Festival in October 2026.

Universal Pictures and Focus Features will release the film in the United Kingdom on November 20, 2026. An Italian release date is set for November 26.

== Reception ==
On the review aggregator Rotten Tomatoes, the film holds an approval rating of 78% based on 81 reviews, with an average rating of 6.7/10. The website’s consensus reads: "Helen Mirren and Alden Ehrenreich make for a fittingly diabolical pair in A Talent for Murder, which playfully dispenses with the facts of Patricia Highsmith's legacy to have some slippery fun with her renowned fiction." Metacritic, which uses a weighted average, assigned the film a score of 66 out of 100, based on 26 critics, indicating "generally favorable" reviews.
