= Toby Marlow =

British composer, writer and actor (born 1994)

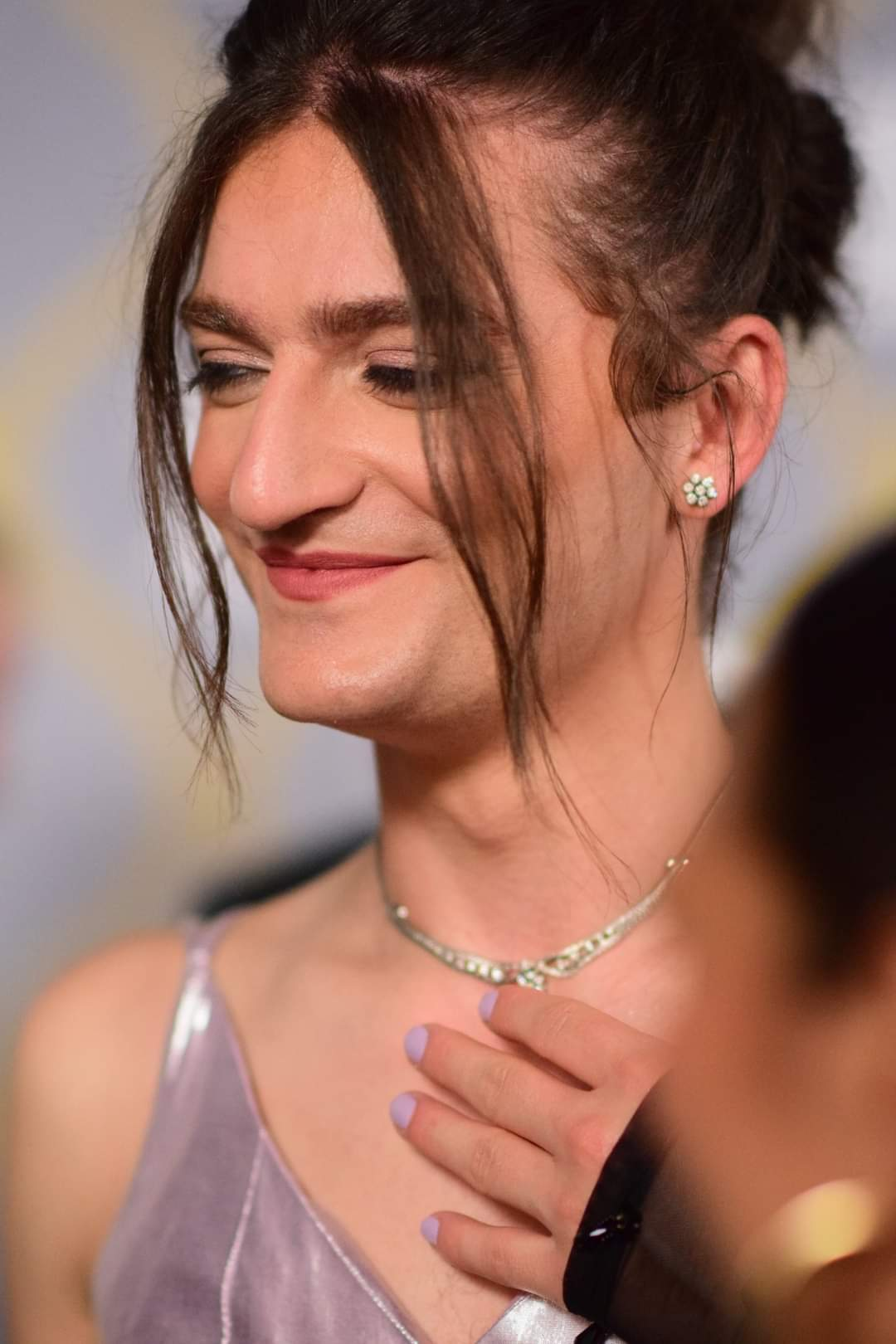
- Marlow at the 75th Tony Awards in 2022
- Born: 12 October 1994 (age 32); Henley-on-Thames, Oxfordshire, England
- Education: Robinson College, Cambridge (BA)
- Occupations: Composer; writer; actor
- Writing career
- Notable works: Six; Hot Gay Time Machine; Why Am I So Single?
- Notable awards: Tony Award for Best Original Score (2022)

Toby Marlow (born 12 October 1994) is a British musical theatre composer, lyricist, playwright, writer, and actor best known for co-creating the international hit musical Six with Lucy Moss. Six received five Olivier Award nominations, including Best New Musical and Outstanding Achievement in Music. Marlow and Moss went on to win the Tony Award for Best Original Score in 2022.

Marlow is also co-creator of Hot Gay Time Machine, a musical comedy cabaret show directed by Lucy Moss, in which they co-star with Zak Ghazi-Torbati.

== Early life and education ==
Marlow was born on 12 October 1994 to parents Helma and Andrew Marlow and was raised in Henley-on-Thames, England. They have two siblings: an older brother named Jasper and younger sister Annabel Marlow, a comedian and singer who is a cast member on Saturday Night Live UK. Marlow's sister also originated the role of Katherine Howard in Six at the 2017 Edinburgh Fringe Festival. Marlow's mother and maternal grandparents are Jewish. They were a child actor from the ages of 9 to 14, appearing in several films and on TV, including an appearance on ITV's Marple, in which they played a French boy with glasses. Marlow's father is a professional musician, their grandfather also trained as an actor and their great-grandmother taught speech and drama.

Marlow was educated at Abingdon School from 2008 to 2013, and was a member of the Acorn Music Theatre Company in Henley. They went on to study English at Robinson College at Cambridge University. While at Cambridge, they were very active in the ADC Theatre scene, as both a performer and a composer. According to Lucy Moss, their friendship "solidified" during the 2015 amateur student production of Rent at the ADC Theatre, during which Marlow played the lead character Angel, and Moss was one of the dancers.

== Career ==
=== Six ===
In 2017, Marlow co-composed and co-wrote the musical Six, produced by Kenny Wax. The musical received positive reviews at the 2017 Edinburgh Fringe Festival and went on to be performed in the West End in London. On 28 July 2019, Marlow stepped into the role of Catherine Parr for two sold-out performances at London's Arts Theatre when a cast member was on vacation, the two standbys for the role were out sick, and the other understudy was performing in a different role in the show. Marlow, along with their collaborator Lucy Moss, signed with Warner Chappell Music in August 2019. Six began previews on Broadway at the Brooks Atkinson Theatre on 13 February 2020 and was scheduled to open on 12 March 2020. However, the show's opening night was delayed due to the closure of all Broadway theatres because of the COVID-19 pandemic. Previews for the show resumed on 17 September 2021 and the official opening night occurred on 3 October 2021.

On 12 June 2022, Marlow became the first openly non-binary composer–lyricist to win a Tony Award, sharing the Tony Award for Best Original Score for Six with Moss.

== Recognition ==
In 2022, Marlow and Moss were included in Time magazine's Time 100 Next list.

== Personal life ==
Marlow is transfeminine and queer. Marlow uses they/them pronouns.

== Filmography ==
Film and TV
Year	Title	Role	Notes
2004	Agatha Christie's Marple: 4:50 from Paddington	James Stoddard-West	(TV Series), 1 episode: "Marple: 4:50 from Paddington"
2005	The Mistress of Spices	Young Doug	Film
2005	Egypt	Young Champollion	(TV Series), 1 episode: "The Mystery of the Rosetta Stone"
2006	Silent Witness	Stephen Owen	(TV Series), 2 episodes: "Supernova" Part 1 and 2
2008	Senseless	Young Eliott	Film
2009	Shadows in the Sun	Sam	Film
2010	Ben Hur	Young Messala	(TV Series), 2 episodes
2010	Mongrels	Death (Voice role)	(TV Series), 1 episode: "Marion the Young Lover"

== See also ==
- Six (musical)
- Lucy Moss
- List of Old Abingdonians
