= Why Am I So Single? =

British musical

- A Big Fancy Musical
- West End Promotional Poster
- Music: Toby Marlow; Lucy Moss
- Lyrics: Toby Marlow; Lucy Moss
- Book: Toby Marlow; Lucy Moss
- Productions: 2024 West End

Why Am I So Single? is a musical with a book, music, and lyrics by Toby Marlow and Lucy Moss. Loosely based on their own lives, Why Am I So Single? follows two musical theatre writers and best friends who are struggling to navigate the frustrations of being constantly single while also trying to write a musical.

The show received a Laurence Olivier Award nomination for Best New Musical & four WhatsOnStage Award nominations (including Best New Musical) and won for Best Casting Direction.

== Plot ==
=== Act 1 ===
The show opens with a spoken prologue by two musical theatre writers, who have been commissioned to write a follow-up to their successful first musical by a theatre in the 'magical place called London's West End,' which is home to many important musicals (and Mamma Mia!). They have decided to write about their own dating lives, adding big musical numbers and modern dance choreography to make audiences think it's worth watching.

The show opens with a doorbell ring - a female writer arriving to her non-binary friend's flat on a Wednesday night following an unsuccessful date with a colleague from her ex-boyfriend's (known as 'The Ex') company, after she broke down crying on discovering that 'The Ex' is moving to Paris with his new girlfriend. She asks her friend if she has left her favourite grey jumper at the flat, as she has lost it.

The duo begin to sing about their lives being single ('Why Am I So Single?'), with both discovering they are equally hopeless in finding love. The two joke that all men are trash and decide to watch 'Friends' whilst drinking prosecco, whilst the female friend decides to order pizza. However, they begin to 'have a little joke' and break the fourth wall to address the audience directly, explaining they were joking about the non-binary friend's dating life being a success when, actually, they had eight dates in a row cancel ('8 Dates'). Before resuming, they explain that, to protect their anonymity, their characters are called Oliver and Nancy, named after characters from their favourite musical, Oliver! With the fourth wall rebuilt, they then receive a phone call from their theatre agent, Faye Ginn, relaying that the Garrick Theatre are seeking an update on the new musical. Faye asks what their parents think about the show, with Nancy explaining that her mum is excited but her father died about ten years ago. They experience connectivity issues, as Oliver's wireless internet needs fixing.

When the call ends, the two are not sure which 'pocket' the musical should sit in, so decide to watch 'Friends' to distract themselves. They watch The Last One, where Rachel gets off the plane to rekindle her on-off relationship with Ross. Nancy talks about how frustrating these cliché love scenes are, explaining that it's no wonder why their love lives are so tragic if they're expected to live up to these standards (which are everywhere in pop culture) - from Shakespeare's Romeo and Juliet to Titanic to Cars. The two then sing about how much they love 'Friends' and this particular scene ('I Got Off The Plane') but are informed by Ross and Rachel that the problem is the duo themselves.

Oliver and Nancy realise they need to do something about their dating lives if they are the problem ('Why Am I So Single? (Reprise)'). They both reflect on their previous dating experiences to figure out where they went wrong as 'case studies.' Nancy talks about her last date (prior to one earlier in the evening) and how it ended over brunch with Oliver and Nancy's friend, Art Fulldodger, known as Artie. We flash back to their brunch at Olive-A-Twist, a cool and trendy brunch establishment recommended by Artie's boyfriend. During their brunch, Artie became frustrated by Nancy waiting for a reply from her date and deliberating on what to text him. He helped Nancy realise she knew nothing about this guy and recommended she end it ('C U Never').

Returning to present day, they realise Artie is great at communication and that's why he is good at having healthy, long-term relationships. Oliver tells Nancy that, as they realised earlier, men are trash and that most frogs stay frogs no matter how many times you kiss them (referencing 'The Princess and the Frog'). This leads Nancy to suggest they both try identifying why they always attract such men by reviewing each other's dating profiles ('Meet Market'). Nancy suggests Oliver's profile hides their true self, leading to Oliver telling Nancy she deliberately picks men to whom she knows she is not attracted. This creates tension between the two, which is interrupted when their pizza arrives, during which time Oliver has an awkward conversation with a delivery driver who is attracted to them. Nancy encourages Oliver to get his number, which Oliver rejects, leading her to ask Oliver if they even know what they are looking for. Oliver reveals a Marilyn Monroe dress with a giant pink bow to sing an 'extended joke' about their dream man keeping their relationship a secret ('Shhh!!!!').

Nancy reprimands Oliver and tells them she knows that this fear and their constant joking about the situation is why they are so single, to which Oliver takes offence. Oliver then says Nancy is so single because she is so focused on finding the perfect boyfriend that she doesn't even think about who she really needs, to which she surprisingly agrees. Nancy says she actually felt she found the perfect boyfriend in 'The Ex' but didn't realise it until after she broke up with him. Oliver retorts that she could do much better than him, but Nancy then reveals she would be willing to abandon everything to get back together with 'The Ex' were he to one day randomly call her again to run away with him ('Just In Case'). Oliver then insists, as her best friend, that Nancy will move on. She argues about Oliver's trust issues when dating and says they won't understand the pain she felt unless they actually give people a chance, encouraging Oliver to be open to her about their issues. Oliver explains that they think it is a game for Nancy, and they do not want to play anymore.

As tensions are rising again and Nancy is pressing Oliver further, the two find a bee in the flat. Although they are still hostile towards each other, they work together to get the bee out of the apartment ('Interlude in B Minor'). Following this success, Nancy declares that this shows they can do anything together and once again asks Oliver to be open to her about their struggles. They agree, but only after a 15-minute intermission; Nancy muses they need a much better cliffhanger before an intermission occurs when, suddenly, Oliver's doorbell rings.

=== Act 2 ===
Returning from the break, Artie has arrived to see Nancy and Oliver, bringing wine gums to commiserate with them about their love lives (revealing Oliver called him whilst singing about abandoning it all). Artie explains that, as a bisexual male, he was not attracted to either of them when they met at university. They recollect the night they all first met at a 2000s throwback club night, and flash back to their different versions of events ('Clubs Glorious Clubs'). It emerges they both kissed Artie that night - Nancy, in order to make a boy jealous and Oliver, to avoid a guy who was flirting with them. They went back to Oliver's flat to watch 'Oliver!' that evening and became best friends since.

Artie leaves and Nancy revisits Oliver's accusation that this exploration of why they are single is a game for her. Oliver explains there is no question she will end up in a happy relationship and move to the Cotswolds ('No Question'); she says, however, that she doesn't see there being a difference between them and encourages Oliver to break through their fear and stop turning everything into a joke. She explains that she sees Oliver as a multi-faceted, spirit-lifting person, like a 'human disco ball,' but as she continues to press, Oliver becomes more manic and reveals that the reason they put on a show is exactly because they are like a disco ball (‘Disco Ball’).

Oliver reveals to Nancy that their fear of letting people see their true self and reliance on using humour is because of shame, caused by homophobic and transphobic experiences which have happened to them as well as in society in general. They reference the use of ‘gay’ as an insult in schools, and a transphobic TV show where a character vomited when they realised they had kissed a trans woman.

Moved to tears, Nancy approaches Oliver, who is very self-conscious about the truths they've revealed. She realises that, actually, the problem still is that ‘men are trash’ and they decide that this is what their big, fancy musical should be about (‘Why Am I So Single? (Reprise: Pig in the City)’). They decide that a song called ‘Men R Trash’ should be the big finale song and go on to write it there and then (‘Men R Trash’) but, during the second verse, Nancy's phone rings. ‘The Ex’ is not moving to Paris with his new girlfriend after all; they have split up and he asks Nancy to move to Paris with him instead, after hearing about her reaction on the date with his colleague.

Oliver finds the situation ridiculous and laughable, but Nancy has decided she is going. After accusing Oliver of avoiding serious issues, Oliver counters that they never discussed the impact the death of Nancy's father has had on her and her relationships. She reacts angrily, telling Oliver that no one has ever been in love with them and that, at this rate, no one ever will be. Oliver reacts in a supportive way, encouraging Nancy to go, before realising they are now alone and want her to stay, deciding to send her a voice note (‘Just in Case (Reprise)’).

Nancy realises she is having doubts following their conversation, changes her mind and returns to Oliver; however, she has not received the voice note due to Oliver's connection issues. She sits with Oliver and explains how her father's death has made her feel lost, like the grey jumper she cannot find, and that is why she has been romanticising her relationship with ‘The Ex’ (‘Lost’).

The duo confess their ‘friendship love’ for each other, with Nancy telling Oliver that they are not a disco ball but an exquisite chandelier, and that she will be there no matter how their gender identity evolves. Oliver explains that Nancy is not, in fact, like her lost jumper and they do, in fact, have it at the flat. They sing ‘I’d Do Anything’ from their favourite musical to each other, deciding that maybe they are not so single after all (‘Why Am I Still Reprising?’).

Oliver suggests that their love story as best friends should be the big and epic story which forms the basis of their new musical, with Nancy suggesting this should be the end – the characters realising that, for today, their love for each other is enough. They write the closing song (‘Better Off Love Story’).

Returning to the start of the musical, the characters break the fourth wall for an epilogue as they watch the musical they've written. They become worried that perhaps their characters are whining and moaning too much and suggest adding something in to make it more self-aware, before deciding not to bother. They conclude it was what they needed to see – a show where friendship love, and friendship love alone, is the happy ever after.

== Development ==
Following the success of Six, Marlow and Moss felt pressure to write a follow-up musical, which prompted them to attend a writer's retreat in Connecticut. As they began working on ideas, they were drawn to talk about their own lives and those of their friends. As a result, Marlow and Moss began writing a musical loosely based on their own experiences.

In 2023, a developmental workshop was held at the Lilian Baylis Studio Theatre at Sadler's Wells. This included a semi-staged public workshop presentation performed for a ticketed audience.

== Production history ==
=== West End (2024) ===
On 14 February 2024, a launch event was held to announce plans for the musical's premiere. It was announced that Why Am I So Single? would play in the West End at the Garrick Theatre from August 2024. Jo Foster and Leesa Tulley were cast in the lead roles, with Foster reprising their role from the workshop. Preview performances began on 27 August 2024 and the show officially opened on 12 September 2024. The production is directed by Moss, with choreography by Ellen Kane, and a set design by Moi Tran. On 25 October 2024, it was announced that the show would close early on 19 January 2025 but the producers said they are not discounting the possibility of bringing the show back to London in the future and discussions for potential productions in the US and around the world already underway. The production closed on 19 January 2025. A cast recording released on 14 March 2025, which alongside the rest of the songs in the show, features an extended version of the song ‘Men R Trash’, with Broadway actress Patti LuPone being one of the vocalists for the song. It also features an Alternate version of ‘Just in Case’, where the show's Alternates Jordan Cambridge-Taylor & Collette Guitart sing the song.

== Musical Numbers ==
Act 1:

- "Prologue"
- "Why Am I So Single?" - Oliver, Nancy & Ensemble
- "8 Dates" - Oliver, Nancy & Ensemble
- "I Got Off the Plane" - Oliver, Nancy & Ensemble
- "Why Am I So Single? (Reprise)" - Oliver and Nancy
- "C U Never" - Artie, Nancy & Ensemble
- "Meet Market" - Oliver, Nancy & Ensemble
- "Shhh!!!!" - Oliver, Nancy & Male Ensemble
- "Just in Case" - Nancy
- "Interlude into B Minor" - Oliver, Nancy & Ensemble

Act 2:

- "Clubs Glorious Clubs" - Company
- "No Question" - Oliver & Nancy
- "Disco Ball" - Oliver & Ensemble
- "Why Am I So Single? (Reprise: Pig in the City)"
- "Men R Trash" - Company
- "Just in Case (Reprise)" - Oliver & Nancy
- "Lost" - Nancy
- "Why Am I Still Reprising?" - Oliver and Nancy
- "Better Off Love Story" - Company

Soundtrack Exclusives:

- "Men R Trash (Extended Version)" - Company & Patti LuPone
- "Just in Case (Alternate Version)" - Jordan Cambridge-Taylor & Collette Guitart

== Cast and characters ==
Character	West End
Character	2024
Oliver	Jo Foster
Nancy	Leesa Tulley
Artie	Noah Thomas

Oliver uses he/him and they/them pronouns and they often switch throughout the show.

== Critical reception ==
The show has received generally positive reviews from critics, following its press night performance on 11 September 2024. In Arifa Akbar's three-star review for The Guardian, she praised the songs saying “not as infectious as Six but the songs are better crafted, more heartfelt, the lyrics gleaming with wit, intelligence, bravura and, in the second half, emotional heft.” Sarah Crompton called the show, “a heartfelt, meta-theatrical marvel” in a five-star review for WhatsOnStage. Nick Curtis called the show “crackerjack show proves Six creators are no one-hit wonders” in a four-star review for the Evening Standard. Harvey Morton called the show “the hottest show in the West End right now” in a five-star review for Queerly. The performances by Jo Foster & Leesa Tulley were both praised by critics and the choreography by Ellen Kane also received praise. However, some critics thought that the writing wasn't great and that the show's runtime should’ve been shortened to around 90 minutes.

== Awards and nominations ==
=== West End production ===
Year	Award	Category	Nominee	Result
2025	WhatsOnStage Awards	Best New Musical		Nominated
2025	WhatsOnStage Awards	Best Performer in a Musical	Jo Foster	Nominated
2025	WhatsOnStage Awards	Best Performer in a Musical	Leesa Tulley	Nominated
2025	WhatsOnStage Awards	Best Casting Direction	Harry Blumenau and Sarah-Jane Price	Won
2025	Laurence Olivier Awards	Best New Musical		Nominated
2025	The Stage Debut Awards	Best Performer in a Musical	Leesa Tulley	Won
