= Hot Gay Time Machine =

British musical cabaret

- Music: Zak Ghazi-Torbati; Toby Marlow; Lucy Moss
- Lyrics: Zak Ghazi-Torbati; Toby Marlow; Lucy Moss
- Book: Zak Ghazi-Torbati; Toby Marlow; Lucy Moss
- Awards: 2017 Edinburgh Fringe Festival, Brighton Fringe Award

Hot Gay Time Machine is a British musical comedy cabaret show created by Zak Ghazi-Torbati and Toby Marlow, and co-authored and directed by Lucy Moss.

== Background ==
Hot Gay Time Machine was co-written by Ghazi-Torbati, Marlow, and Moss when they were students at Cambridge University. The show debuted in February 2017 at the Corpus Playroom at Corpus Christi College.

== Productions ==
Hot Gay Time Machine was performed at the 2017 Edinburgh Fringe Festival, winning the Brighton Fringe Award for Excellence, and returned for a sold-out run at the Fringe in 2018. The show's co-creator Toby Marlow performed in Hot Gay Time Machine at the same time that another of their co-creations, the musical Six, was on in Edinburgh.

In November 2017, the show had a brief run at The Other Palace Studio. From December 2018 to January 2019, it had a limited run at Trafalgar Studios in London's West End, for which festive jokes were added to the show. In August 2021, it had a limited run at Soho Theatre.

== Plot and format ==
During the 75-minute show, Marlow and Ghazi-Torbati take the audience through "a musical retrospective of their lives", travelling back to the first moment when each of them realised they were gay. Other moments they re-enact humorously include coming out and anxieties in the school changing room, through to their first sexual experiences and challenges in forming friendships with other gay men. The show features two life-sized cutouts of Beyoncé, and incorporates pop hits and dance anthems, as well as original musical numbers, including vocals and keyboard (the "hot gay music machine"). The finale for the show is a dance party with audience participation.

== Critical reception ==
Reviews of Hot Gay Time Machine have been positive, with many reviews describing it as "hysterical". In a review for Attitude, Steve Brown described the lyrics as "[veering] from witty to filthy" and the music as "instantly catchy and delivered with madcap energy." Paul Vale also commented in The Stage on Marlow and Ghazi-Torbati's high-energy performance, and quipped, "they are bursting with gay pride, ready to party and appear to have no off-switch."

The music has drawn comparisons with Six, with Alun Hood writing in Whats on Stage that "HGTM...offers a cursorily similar combination of catchy, derivative tunes overlaid with coruscating lyrics."

Fiona Mountford of The Evening Standard emphasised that the show was recommended for ages 18+ for a reason, noting that Marlow and Ghazi-Torbati "are not going to spare the details or the blushes".
