= Firebrand (2023 film) =

2023 film by Karim Aïnouz

- Theatrical release poster
- Directed by: Karim Aïnouz
- Written by: Henrietta Ashworth; Jessica Ashworth
- Based on: Queen's Gambit by Elizabeth Fremantle
- Produced by: Carolyn Marks Blackwood; Gabrielle Tana
- Starring: Alicia Vikander; Jude Law; Eddie Marsan; Sam Riley; Simon Russell Beale
- Cinematography: Hélène Louvart
- Edited by: Heike Parplies
- Music by: Dickon Hinchliffe
- Production companies: MBK Productions; Brouhaha Entertainment
- Distributed by: MetFilm Distribution
- Release dates: 21 May 2023 (Cannes); 6 September 2024 (United Kingdom)
- Running time: 120 minutes
- Country: United Kingdom
- Language: English
- Box office: $4.5 million

Firebrand is a 2023 British historical drama film directed by Karim Aïnouz and written by Henrietta Ashworth and Jessica Ashworth, based on the 2013 novel Queen's Gambit by Elizabeth Fremantle. The film focuses on Catherine Parr, Queen of England, the sixth wife of Henry VIII. It stars Alicia Vikander, Jude Law, and Eddie Marsan. The film marks Aïnouz's first directorial effort in the English language.

Firebrand premiered at the 76th Cannes Film Festival on 21 May 2023, where it was selected to compete for Palme d'Or. It was released in the United Kingdom on 6 September 2024.

== Plot ==
Catherine Parr (Vikander), the sixth wife of King Henry VIII (Law), is named regent while the king leads his army in France. Catherine looks after Henry's children, Mary, Elizabeth, and Edward. Catherine takes risks to meet up with an old friend, Anne Askew, who is preaching Protestantism and later executed as a heretic.

When the king returns, increasingly ill and paranoid, Catherine finds herself fighting for her own survival as Henry's courtiers increasingly try to turn the king against her. Catherine becomes pregnant, but has a miscarriage shortly after.

Bishop Gardiner believes Catherine's religious views are dangerous, and convinces Henry to have her arrested. She is locked in a dungeon, but Henry soon frees her. Afraid for her future, she goes to his bedside and kills him.

== Cast ==
- Alicia Vikander as Katherine Parr
- Jude Law as Henry VIII
- Eddie Marsan as Edward Seymour
- Sam Riley as Thomas Seymour
- Simon Russell Beale as Bishop Stephen Gardiner
- Ruby Bentall as Cat
- Bryony Hannah as Ellen
- Maia Jemmett as Dot
- Amr Waked as Dr. Mulay Al Farabi
- Erin Doherty as Anne Askew
- Junia Rees as Princess Elizabeth
- Patsy Ferran as Princess Mary
- Patrick Buckley as Prince Edward
- Mina Andala as Jalinda
- Paul Tinto as Stowe
- Mia Threapleton as Joan Bocher
- Linnéa Martinsson as Maude Lane
- Ashley Reynolds as Leo
- Lisa Pyk Wirström as Eleanor Browne
- Ian Drysdale as Sir Anthony Denny
- Edward Harrison as Sir John Gates
- Norman Bowman as Sir William Herbert
- Jason Baughan as Will Sommers
- Anna Mawn as Agnes Howard

== Production ==
The film was announced during the 2021 American Film Market. Karim Aïnouz was set to direct, with Michelle Williams and Jude Law cast to star. In March 2022, Alicia Vikander joined the cast, replacing Williams. In May, Sam Riley, Eddie Marsan, Simon Russell Beale and Erin Doherty were among the additional cast announced for the film.

Filming began by April 2022, with shooting taking place at Haddon Hall in Bakewell, Derbyshire, until June.

== Release ==
Firebrand was selected to compete for the Palme d'Or at the 2023 Cannes Film Festival, where it had its world premiere on 21 May 2023. FilmNation Entertainment sold the film to STXinternational for the United Kingdom and to Sony Pictures Worldwide Acquisitions for Germany, Greece, Scandinavia, Iceland, the Middle East, Turkey, Australia, New Zealand, South Africa and Asia excluding Japan and independent distributors elsewhere. Amazon Prime Video was rumoured to have been in negotiations to acquire UK rights from STX, but it was later revealed the deal had already taken place in 2022. It was released in cinemas in the United Kingdom on 6 September 2024.

In December 2023, Roadside Attractions and Vertical Entertainment acquired US distribution rights to the film, scheduling it for a cinema release on 14 June 2024.

== Reception ==
On the review aggregator website Rotten Tomatoes, 59% of 94 critics' reviews are positive, with an average rating of 6/10. The website's consensus reads: "Divorced from the historical record with little to show for it, Firebrand is a period piece whose revisionist aims are at odds with its stultifying approach." Metacritic, which uses a weighted average, assigned the film a score of 61 out of 100, based on 13 critics, indicating "generally favorable" reviews.
