= Brouhaha Entertainment =

Film and television production company

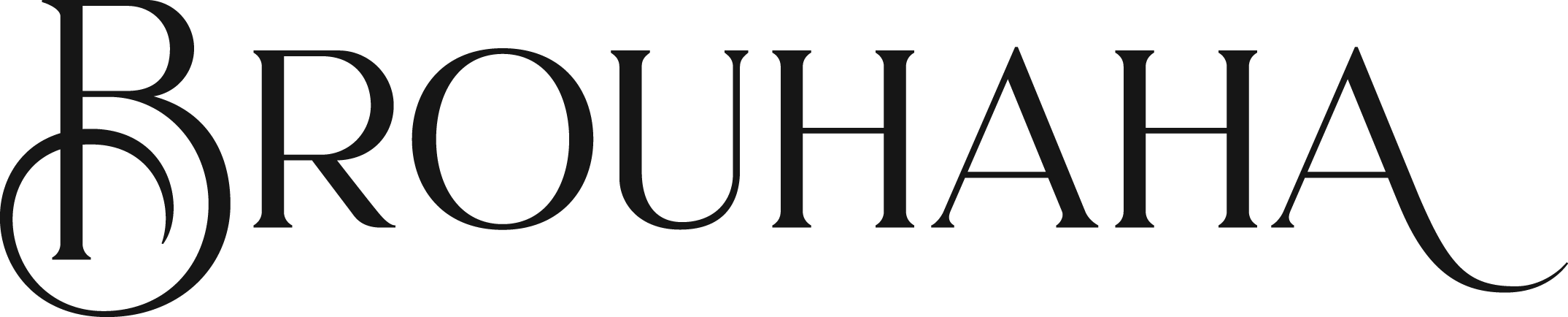
- Type: Private
- Industry: Entertainment
- Founded: June 2021; 5 years ago
- Founder: Gabrielle Tana; Troy Lum; Andrew Mason
- Headquarters: London, England; Sydney, Australia
- Number of locations: 2 (until 2024)
- Area served: Worldwide
- Services: Film production; Television production
- Website: www.brouhahaent.com

Brouhaha Entertainment (Brouhaha) is an independent global entertainment company founded in 2021 by Gabrielle Tana, Troy Lum and Andrew Mason. It is based in London and Sydney.

== History ==
Brouhaha Entertainment was founded in 2021 by Gabrielle Tana, Troy Lum and Andrew Mason. In 2024, Brouhaha made its first foray into television with Boy Swallows Universe, a limited series commissioned by Netflix.

=== Television projects ===
The television adaptation rights of Trent Dalton's novel Boy Swallows Universe were acquired by Brouhaha, Anonymous Content and Chapter One. On 4 March 2022, it was announced that an 8-episode limited series had been commissioned by Netflix, with producers Andrew Mason and Troy Lum of Brouhaha Entertainment, Sophie Gardiner of Chapter One, and Kerry Kohansky-Roberts and Toby Bentley of Anonymous Content.

== Catalog ==
=== Films ===
Catalog of films produced by Brouhaha Entertainment
Year	Title	Release date	Distributor	Sales Agent	Reception	
Year	Title	Release date	Distributor	Sales Agent	Rotten Tomatoes	Metacritic
2023	Lee	9 September 2023	Sky Cinema	UTA CAA	70%	59%
2023	The Convert	7 September 2023	—N/a	Mister Smith Entertainment	83%	66%
2023	Firebrand	21 May 2023	Roadside Attractions; Vertical	FilmNation Entertainment	56%	55%
2023	Cottontail	26 October 2023	—N/a	WestEnd Films	90%	—N/a
2024	Motel Destino	22 May 2024	Pandora Filmes (Brazil); Tandem Films (France)	Match Factory Productions	65%	73%
2025	Dangerous Animals	12 June 2025	Kismet (Australia and New Zealand); IFC Films and Shudder (U.S.)	Mister Smith Entertainment	87%	65%
2025	Long Day's Journey into Night	27 February 2025	—N/a	UTA	—N/a	—N/a
2026	Switzerland	—N/a	—N/a	FilmNation Entertainment	—N/a	—N/a

=== Television ===
Catalog of television shows produced by Brouhaha Entertainment
Year	Title	Air date	Number of		Distributor	Reception	
Year	Title	Air date	Seasons	Episodes	Distributor	Rotten Tomatoes	Metacritic
2024	Boy Swallows Universe	11 January 2024	1	7	Netflix	87%	68%
