= The Lamentation of a Sinner =

Book written by Catherine Parr

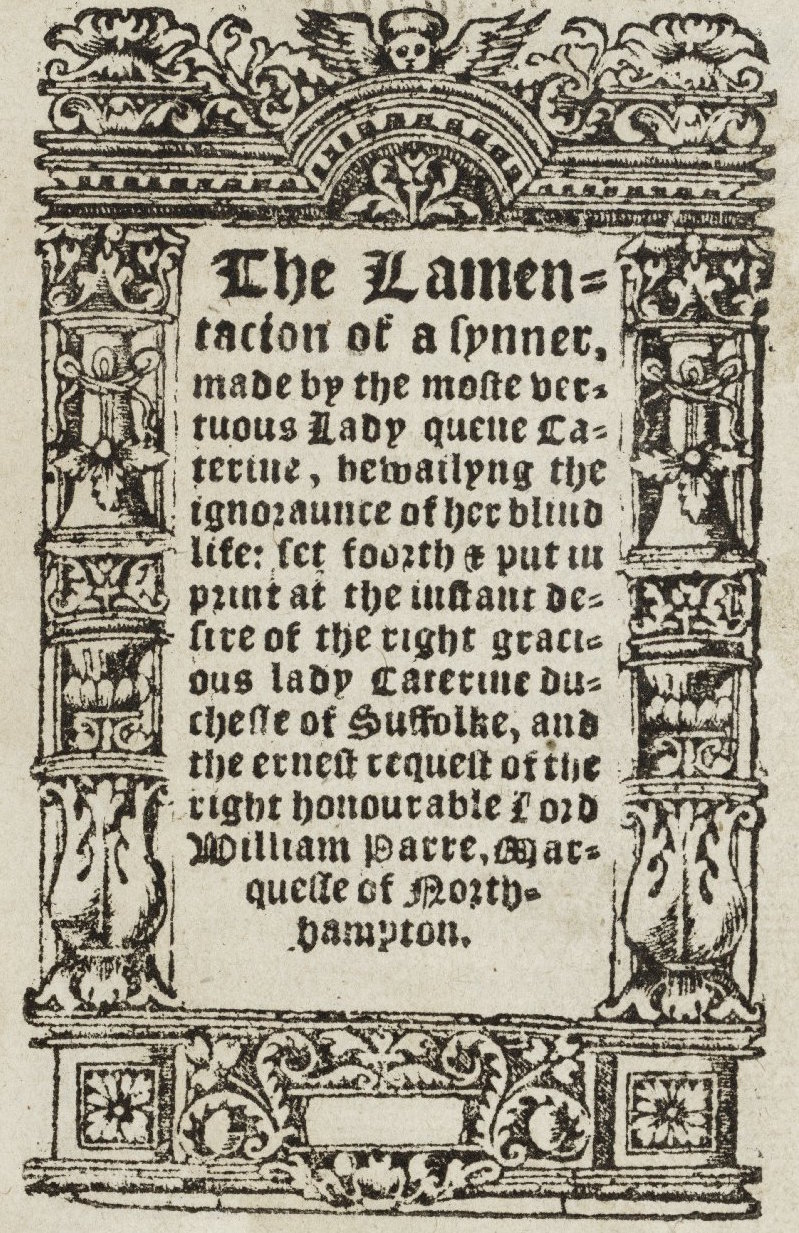
Title page of The Lamentation of a Sinner

The Lamentation of a Sinner (contemporary spelling: The Lamentacion of a Synner) is a three-part sequence of reflections published by the English queen Catherine Parr, the first woman to publish in England in English under her own name. It was written in the autumn of 1546 at the latest and published in November 1547, after her husband's death. Its publication was sponsored by the Duchess of Suffolk and the Marquess of Northampton, the Queen's closest friend and only brother respectively.

== Background ==
Catherine Parr, who became queen in 1543, had a profound influence on government decisions, including religious policy. She succeeded in preventing her husband Henry VIII from plundering universities, which had happened to monasteries in 1541. Eminent humanists advocating the Reformation had place in her household, and she entrusted to them the education of her stepchildren, the future monarchs Elizabeth I and Edward VI. She hosted readings of the newly published English translations of the Bible for her friends and theologians, and did not refrain from engaging in debate about the Reformation with her more conservative husband. He eventually became discontented with her growing independence; sensing this, her opponents at court tried to incriminate her during the trial for heresy of the Protestant Anne Askew in 1546. Heresy charges were drawn up against the Queen, with the King's approval, and her rooms were searched for unorthodox literature, but no evidence was found. She publicly submitted to her husband's supreme authority and so avoided becoming the third of Henry's wives to be executed (following Anne Boleyn and Catherine Howard), but remained undeterred in her Protestant conviction.

== Content and doctrine ==
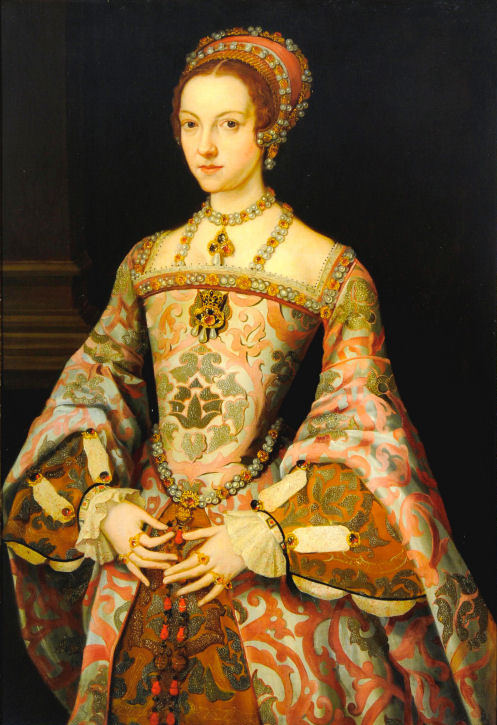
Queen Catherine died less than a year after The Lamentation of a Sinner was published.

The Lamentation of a Sinner, Parr's wholly original work, was probably written in the summer and autumn of 1546 and started circulating in manuscript at court in November. It remained unpublished until 5 November 1547, nine months after her husband's death and the accession of her Protestant stepson. It starts with the themes of confession and repentance, with an unusual degree of self-debasement that would not have been appropriate for the monarch's wife. It then moves to conversion and prophecy, a pattern inspired by the Psalms. Although Parr wrote in the first person and recounted her own religious experience, she avoided using too many autobiographical or topical details (as Marguerite de Navarre had done), maintaining both authentic and universalized voice. She explicitly identified herself as Queen of England, King Henry VIII's wife; the contrasting of her sinfulness with her status was unprecedented.

The small volume was strongly anti-Roman Catholic, referring to "papal riffraff", and the insistence that all people be able to read the Bible in English for themselves. The book's emphasis on the importance of the scripture marks it clearly as a reformist work, as does its promotion of the Lutheran concept of justification by faith alone. Parr, however, carefully avoided extremes and criticized the sententiousness of "vain gospellers", although never directing any criticism on anyone in particular. She argued that the Reformation urged Christians to look to themselves rather than to judge others.

== Significance ==
The Lamentation of a Sinner is the first published conversion narrative, a genre which was heavily used by the Nonconformists in the following century. It was, however, much less circulated among English readers than Parr's previous (and not entirely original) works, Psalms or Prayers (1544) and Prayers or Meditations (1545). The young Edward VI may have been influenced by the subjectivity expressed in the book. It turned out to be a revolutionary text that led to a drastic change in the Tudor court's view of literature during the reign of Parr's serious and astute stepson.
