= Prayers or Meditations =

1545 book by English queen Catherine Parr

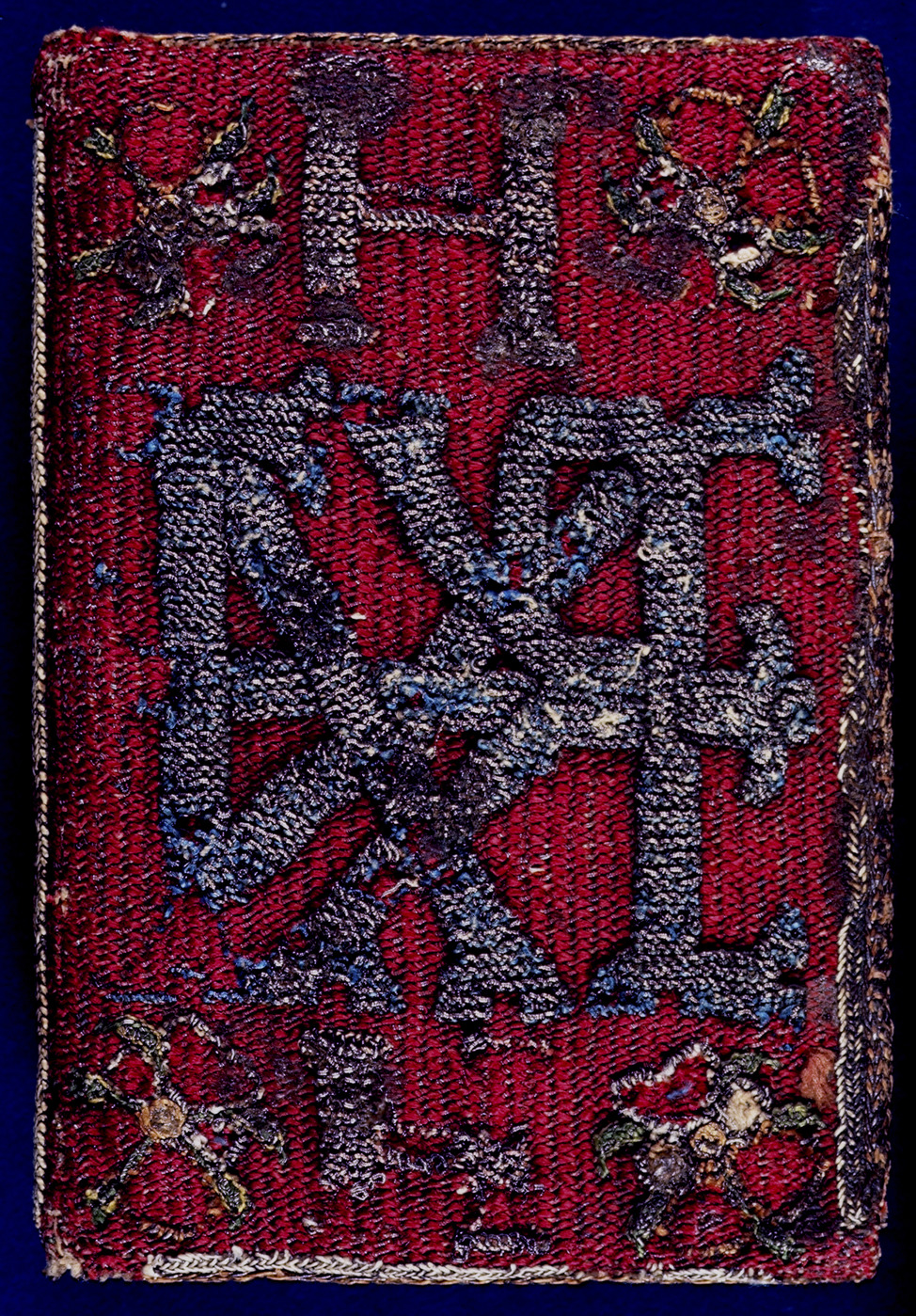
Embroidered back cover of the trilingual translation by Elizabeth I. Parr's monogram is in the centre.

Prayers or Meditations was written in 1545 by the English queen Catherine Parr. It was published under her name. It first appeared in print on 8 June 1545. Preceded in the previous year by her anonymously published Psalms or Prayers, the 60-page book consisted of vernacular texts selected and assembled by the Queen for personal devotion. It is based on the much longer 15th-century Catholic devotional book by Thomas à Kempis, The Imitation of Christ, but reoriented for the purposes of the developing Church of England.

Parr envisaged it as a private counterpart to the Exhortation and Litany, authored for public devotion by the Archbishop of Canterbury Thomas Cranmer. Archbishop Cranmer's was the first such work for the Church of England to receive royal approval; to be released for general use, Queen Catherine too must have needed to obtain permission of her husband, King Henry VIII, as well as approval of the Archbishop.

Prayers or Meditations reached a remarkable number of editions in the 16th century and was overall very successful among English readers during Parr's lifetime and after her death in 1548. Her stepdaughter Elizabeth translated it into Latin, French and Italian as a New Year's gift to Henry VIII.

== See also ==
- The Lamentation of a Sinner, Parr's second book published under her own name.
