= Psalms or Prayers =

First book published by Catherine Parr

Psalms or Prayers was the first book published by Catherine Parr, queen consort of England. It is an English translation of the Latin Psalms, published by John Fisher around 1525.

Psalms or Prayers was published anonymously in 1544 by Parr, the sixth wife of Henry VIII. She went on to publish Prayers or Meditations in 1545 and The Lamentation of a Sinner in 1548.
