= Catherine Parr =

Queen of England and Ireland from 1543 to 1547

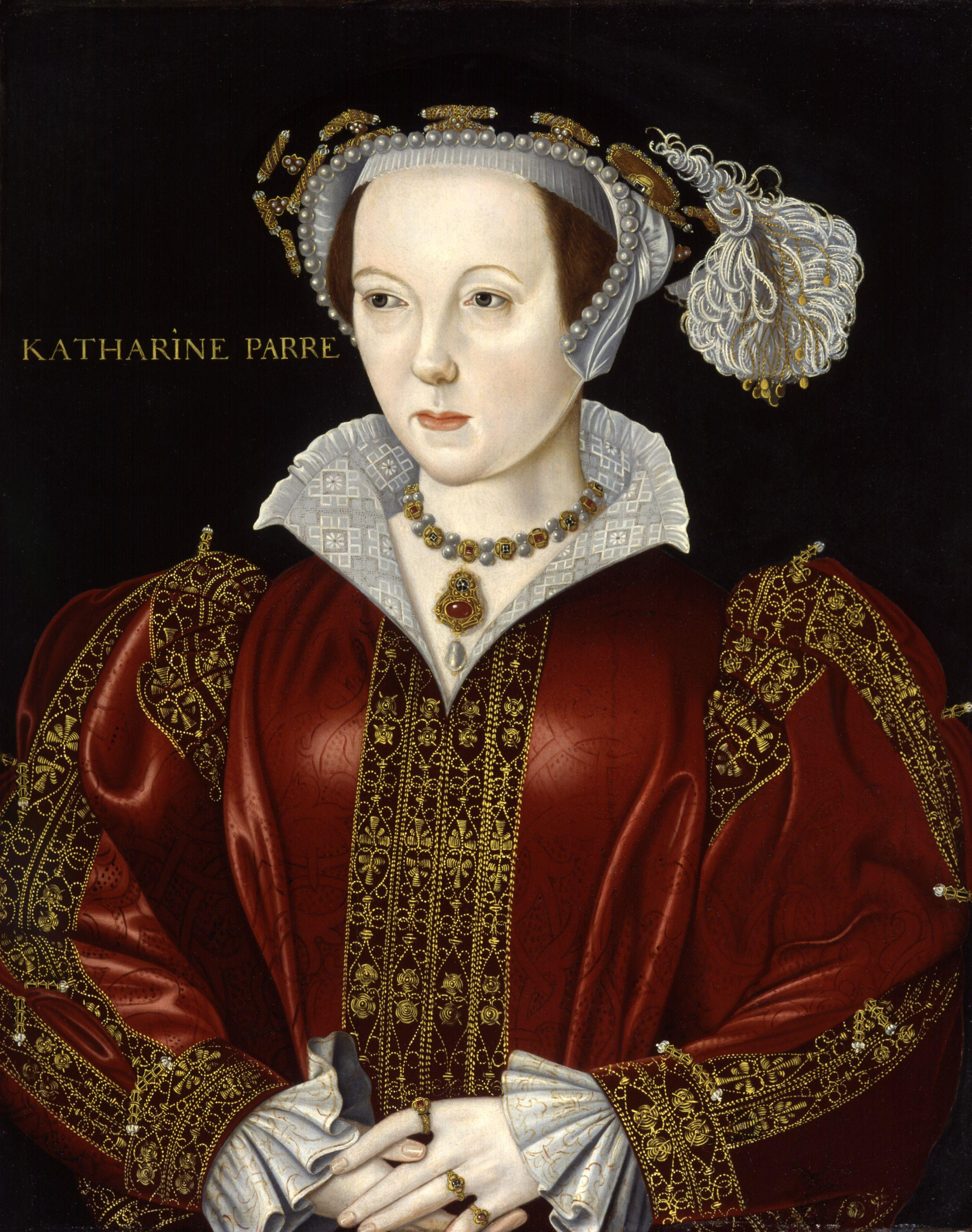
- Portrait, c. 1545

Queen consort of England and Ireland
- Tenure: 12 July 1543 – 28 January 1547
- Born: c. July or August 1512; Blackfriars, London, England
- Died: 5 September 1548 (aged 36); Sudeley Castle, Gloucestershire, England
- Burial: 7 September 1548; St Mary's Chapel, Sudeley Castle
- Spouses: Sir Edward Burgh (m. 1529; died 1533) John Neville, 3rd Baron Latimer (m. 1534; died 1543) Henry VIII (m. 1543; died 1547) Thomas Seymour, 1st Baron Seymour of Sudeley (m. 1547)
- Issue: Mary Seymour
- Father: Sir Thomas Parr
- Mother: Maud Green
- Religion: Protestant

Catherine Parr (Note: She signed her letters as Kateryn.) (c. July or August 1512 – 5 September 1548) was Queen of England and Ireland as the last of the six wives of King Henry VIII from their marriage on 12 July 1543 until Henry's death on 28 January 1547. Catherine was the final queen consort of the House of Tudor, and outlived Henry by a year and eight months. With four husbands, she is the most-married English queen. She was the first woman in England to publish in print an original work under her own name in the English language. (Note: Julian of Norwich published A Book of Showings in about 1414, but this was only circulated in manuscript.)

Catherine had a close relationship with Henry's three children, Mary, Elizabeth, and Edward. She was personally involved in the education of Elizabeth and Edward. She was influential in persuading Henry to pass the Third Succession Act in 1543 which restored Mary and Elizabeth to the line of succession. Catherine was appointed regent from July to September 1544 while Henry was on a military campaign in France; in the event that he lost his life, she was to rule as regent until Edward came of age. However, he did not give her any function in government in his will.

On account of her Protestant sympathies, she provoked the enmity of anti-Protestant officials, who sought to turn the King against her; a warrant for her arrest was drawn up, probably in the spring of 1546. However, she and the king soon reconciled.

On 25 April 1544, Catherine published her first book, Psalms or Prayers, anonymously. Her book Prayers or Meditations became the first original book published by an English queen under her own name on 2 June 1545. She published a third book, The Lamentation of a Sinner, on 5 November 1547, nine months after the death of King Henry VIII.

After Henry's death on 28 January 1547, Catherine as queen dowager was allowed to keep the queen's jewels and dresses. She became guardian to her stepdaughter Elizabeth, and took Henry's great-niece Lady Jane Grey into her household. About six months after Henry's death, she married her fourth and final husband, Thomas Seymour, 1st Baron Seymour of Sudeley. The marriage was short-lived, as she died on 5 September 1548 due to complications of childbirth. Her funeral, held on 7 September 1548, was the first Protestant funeral in England, Scotland or Ireland to be held in English.

== Early life and adolescence ==
Catherine Parr was the eldest child of Sir Thomas Parr, lord of the manor of Kendal in Westmorland (now in Cumbria), and Maud Green, daughter and co-heiress of Sir Thomas Green, lord of Greens Norton, Northamptonshire, and Joan Fogge. Sir Thomas Parr was a descendant of King Edward III, and the Parrs were a substantial northern family which included many knights. Catherine had a younger brother, William, who was later created first Marquess of Northampton, and a younger sister, Anne, later Countess of Pembroke. Sir Thomas was a close companion to King Henry VIII, and was rewarded as such with responsibilities and/or incomes from his positions as Sheriff of Northamptonshire, Master of the Wards, and Comptroller of the Household. Catherine's mother was a close friend and attendant of Catherine of Aragon, and Catherine Parr was probably named after Queen Catherine, who was her godmother.

She was born in 1512, probably in either late July or August. (Note: Susan James notes that the record of Catherine's death, dated 5 September 1548, indicates that as she had "passed her thirty-sixth birthday", the likeliest date of her birth is between late July and the end of August 1512.) It was once thought that Catherine Parr had been born at Kendal Castle in Westmorland. However, at the time of her birth, Kendal Castle was already in very poor condition. During her pregnancy, Maud Parr remained at court attending the Queen, and by necessity the Parr family were living in their townhouse at Blackfriars. Historians now consider it unlikely that Sir Thomas would have taken his pregnant wife on an arduous two-week journey north over bad roads to give birth in a crumbling castle in which neither of them seemed to spend much time. Catherine's father died when she was young, and she was close to her mother as she grew up.

Her initial education was similar to other well-born women, but she developed a passion for learning which would continue throughout her life. She was fluent in French, Italian, and Latin, and began learning Spanish after becoming queen. Catherine was raised as a Catholic but like Anne Boleyn at some point turned to Protestantism. According to biographer Linda Porter, the story that as a child Catherine could not tolerate sewing, although the claim that she often said to her mother that "my hands are ordained to touch crowns and sceptres, not spindles and needles" is very likely apocryphal.

=== First marriage (1529–1533) ===
In 1529, when she was seventeen, Catherine married Sir Edward Burgh (pronounced and sometimes written as Borough), a grandson of Edward Burgh, 2nd Baron Burgh. Earlier biographies mistakenly reported that Catherine had married the older Burgh. Following the 2nd Baron Burgh's death in December 1528, Catherine's father-in-law Sir Thomas Burgh was summoned to Parliament in 1529 as Baron Burgh.

Catherine's first husband was in his twenties and may have been in poor health. He served as a feoffee for Thomas Kiddell and as a justice of the peace. His father also secured a joint patent in survivorship with his son for the office of steward of the manor of the soke of Kirton in Lindsey. The younger Sir Edward Burgh died in the spring of 1533, not surviving to inherit the title of Baron Burgh.

== Lady Latimer (1534–1543) ==
Following her first husband's death, Catherine Parr may have spent time with the Dowager Lady Strickland, Katherine Neville, who was the widow of Catherine's cousin Sir Walter Strickland, at the Stricklands' family residence of Sizergh Castle in Westmorland (now in Cumbria). In the summer of 1534, Catherine married, secondly, John Neville, 3rd Baron Latimer, her father's second cousin and a kinsman of Lady Strickland. With this marriage, Catherine became only the second woman in the Parr family to marry into the peerage.

The twice-widowed Latimer was nearly twice Catherine's age. From his first marriage to Dorothy de Vere, sister of John de Vere, 14th Earl of Oxford, he had two children, John and Margaret. Although Latimer was in financial difficulties after he and his brothers had pursued legal action to claim the title of Earl of Warwick, Catherine now had a home of her own, a title and a husband with position and influence in the north.

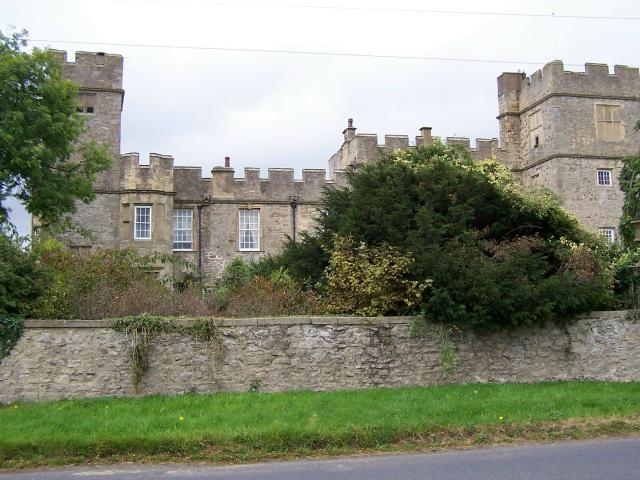
Snape Castle in North Yorkshire

=== Pilgrimage of Grace and later ===
Latimer was a supporter of the Catholic Church and had opposed the King's first annulment, his subsequent marriage to Anne Boleyn, and the religious consequences. In October 1536, during the Lincolnshire Rising, Catholic rebels appeared before the Latimers' home, threatening violence if Latimer did not join their efforts to reinstate the links between England and Rome. Catherine watched as her husband was dragged away. Between October 1536 and April 1537, Catherine lived alone in fear with her step-children, struggling to survive. It is probable that, in these uncertain times, Catherine's strong reaction against the rebellion strengthened her adherence to the reformed Church of England. In January 1537, during the uprising known as the Pilgrimage of Grace, Catherine and her step-children were held hostage at Snape Castle in North Yorkshire. The rebels ransacked the house and sent word to Lord Latimer, who was returning from London, that if he did not return immediately they would kill his family. When Latimer returned to the castle, he managed to talk the rebels into releasing his family and leaving, but the aftermath was taxing on the whole family.

The King and Thomas Cromwell heard conflicting reports as to whether Latimer was a prisoner or a conspirator. As a conspirator, he could be found guilty of treason, forfeiting his estates and leaving Catherine and her step-children penniless. The King himself wrote to Thomas Howard, 3rd Duke of Norfolk, pressing him to make sure Latimer would "condemn that villain [Robert] Aske and submit to our clemency". Latimer complied. It is likely that Catherine's brother William Parr and her uncle, William Parr, 1st Baron Parr of Horton, who both fought against the rebellion, intervened to save Latimer's life.

Although no charges were laid against him, Latimer's reputation, which reflected upon Catherine, was tarnished for the rest of his life. Over the next seven years, the family spent much of their time in the south. In 1542, the family spent time in London as Latimer attended parliament. Catherine visited her brother William Parr, 1st Marquess of Northampton and her sister Anne Parr, Countess of Pembroke at court. It was here that Catherine became acquainted with her future fourth husband, Sir Thomas Seymour. The atmosphere of the court was greatly different from that of the rural estates she knew. There, Catherine could find the latest trends, not only in religious matters, but in less weighty secular matters such as fashion and jewellery.

By the winter of 1542, Lord Latimer's health had worsened. Catherine nursed her husband until his death in 1543. In his will, Catherine was named as guardian of his daughter, Margaret, and was put in charge of his affairs until his daughter's majority. Latimer left Catherine a life interest in the manor of Stowe in Northamptonshire, eleven miles from Horton, and other properties. He also bequeathed money for supporting his daughter, and in the case that his daughter did not marry within five years, Catherine was to take £30 a year out of the income to support her. Catherine was left a rich widow, but after Lord Latimer's death she faced the possibility of having to return north. It is likely that Catherine sincerely mourned her husband; she kept a remembrance of him, his New Testament with his name inscribed inside, until her death.

Using her late mother's friendship with Henry's first queen, Catherine of Aragon, Catherine took the opportunity to renew her own friendship with the former queen's daughter, Lady Mary. By 16 February 1543, Catherine had established herself as part of Mary's household, and it was there that Catherine caught the attention of the King. Although she had begun a romantic friendship with Sir Thomas Seymour, the brother of the late queen Jane Seymour, she saw it as her duty to accept Henry's proposal over Seymour's. Seymour was given a posting in Brussels to remove him from the King's court.

== Queen of England and Ireland ==
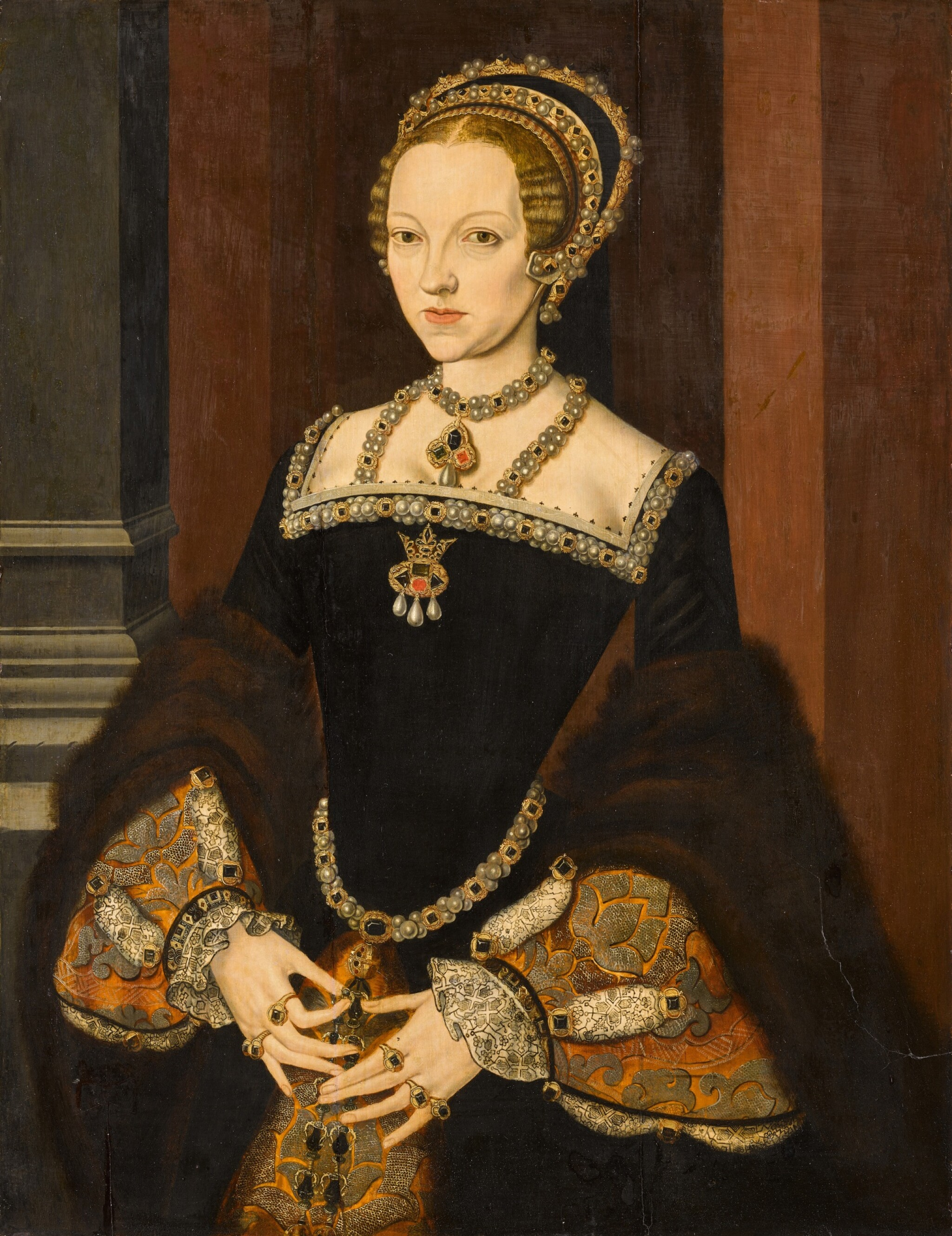
The "Jersey" portrait of Queen Catherine

Catherine married Henry VIII on 12 July 1543 at Hampton Court Palace. She was the first queen of England also to be queen of Ireland following Henry's adoption of the title king of Ireland. She was also the third of his wives to be named Catherine, although she spelled it "Kateryn" in signatures. Catherine and her new husband shared several common royal and noble ancestors, making them multiple cousins. By Henry's mother and Catherine's father they were third cousins once removed, sharing Ralph Neville, 1st Earl of Westmorland, and Lady Joan Beaufort (granddaughter of Edward III), and by their fathers they were double fourth cousins once removed, sharing Thomas Holland, 2nd Earl of Kent (son of Joan of Kent) and Lady Alice FitzAlan (granddaughter of Henry, 3rd Earl of Lancaster) and John of Gaunt, 1st Duke of Lancaster (son of Edward III) and Katherine Swynford.

On becoming queen, Catherine installed her former stepdaughter, Margaret Neville, as her lady-in-waiting, and gave her cousin Maud, Lady Lane and her stepson John's wife, Lucy Somerset, positions in her household. Catherine was partially responsible for reconciling Henry with his daughters from his first two marriages, and also developed a good relationship with Henry's son Edward. When she became queen, her uncle Lord Parr of Horton became her Lord Chamberlain.

Left: Coat of arms of Catherine Parr as queen consort; Right: Rose Maiden heraldic badge used by Catherine

Parr's Psalms or Prayers taken out of Holy Scriptures, was printed by the King's printer on 25 April 1544. It was an anonymous translation of a Latin work by Bishop John Fisher (c. 1525) that had been reprinted on 18 April 1544. Fisher had been executed in 1535 for refusing to take the oath of supremacy, and his name does not appear on the title page. Parr's volume appeared as preparations for war were being finalised, and it served as a powerful piece of wartime propaganda designed to help Henry win the war against France and Scotland via the prayers of his people. The volume contains seventeen "Psalms", focused largely on defeating enemies, and it concludes with "A Prayer for the King", derived from a prayer for the Holy Roman Emperor by Georg Witzel, and "A Prayer for Men to Say Entering into Battle", a translation of a prayer by Erasmus. Parr paid for deluxe gift copies of the book which were printed on vellum and distributed at court. One deluxe copy has annotations by Henry VIII. The "Ninth Psalm" was set to pre-existing music by Thomas Tallis and was likely performed as part of special wartime ceremony at St. Paul's Cathedral on 22 May 1544. Parr's "A Prayer for the King" had an important afterlife. In 1559, it was edited and inserted into the Book of Common Prayer, probably by Elizabeth I who was then Supreme Governor of the Church of England. This prayer remains in the Book of Common Prayer and is still used to pray for the British monarch by Anglican communities around the globe.

Henry went on his last campaign to France from July to September 1544, leaving Catherine as his regent. Because her regency council was composed of sympathetic members, including Thomas Cranmer (the Archbishop of Canterbury), Lord Hertford and her uncle William Parr, Lord Parr of Horton (included at her particular request), Catherine obtained effective control and was able to rule as she saw fit. She handled provision, finances, and musters for Henry's French campaign, signed five royal proclamations, and maintained constant contact with her lieutenant in the northern Marches, Lord Shrewsbury, over the complex and unstable situation with Scotland. It is thought that her actions as regent, together with her strength of character and noted dignity, and later religious convictions, greatly influenced her stepdaughter Lady Elizabeth (the future Elizabeth I).

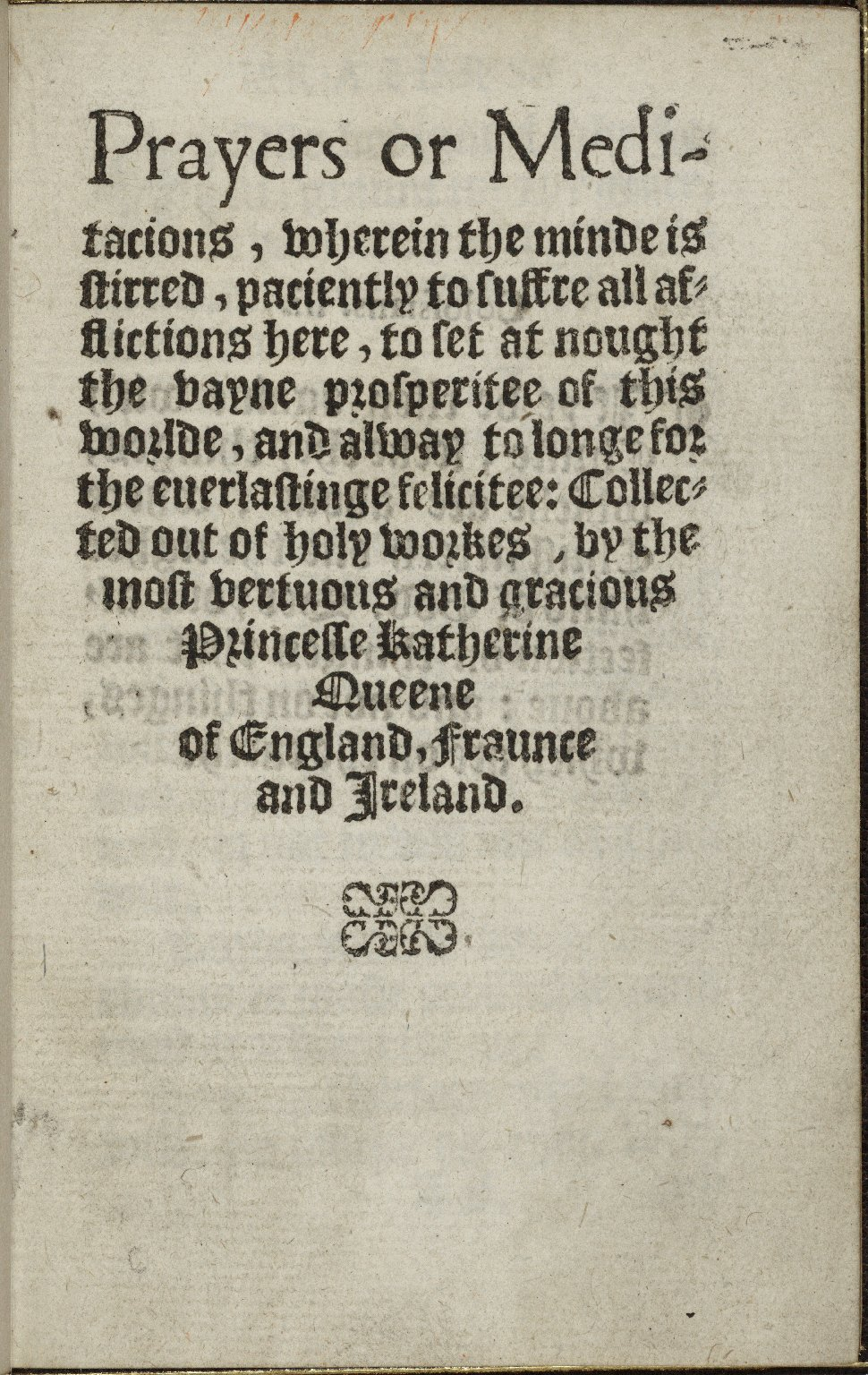
Title page of Parr's Prayers or Meditations, published in 1545

Parr's second publication, Prayers or Meditations, appeared in June 1545, and, like her first book, it was a bestseller. In this case, Parr's compositional method was a complex one as she reworked the third book of Thomas à Kempis's Imitatio Christi to produce a monologue spoken by a generic Christian speaker. The volume also circulated in manuscript and deluxe print copies. Princess Elizabeth translated the work into Latin, Italian and French as a New Year's gift for Henry VIII in December 1545 and presented the manuscript in a beautiful hand-embroidered cover. The volume has been digitised by the British Library.

The Queen's religious views were viewed with suspicion by anti-Protestant officials such as Stephen Gardiner (the Bishop of Winchester) and Lord Wriothesley (the Lord Chancellor). Although brought up as a Catholic, she later became sympathetic to and interested in the "New Faith". By the mid-1540s, she came under suspicion that she was actually a Protestant. This view is supported by the strong reformed ideas that she revealed after Henry's death, when her third book, Lamentation of a Sinner, was published in late 1547. In 1546, the Bishop of Winchester and Lord Wriothesley tried to turn the King against her. An arrest warrant was drawn up for her and rumours abounded across Europe that the King was attracted to her close friend, the Duchess of Suffolk. However, she saw the warrant and managed to reconcile with the King after vowing that she had only argued about religion with him to take his mind off the suffering caused by his ulcerous leg. The following day chancellor Wriothesley (with a detachment of the Guard), who was unaware of the reconciliation, tried to arrest her while she walked with Henry. The King angrily dismissed his chancellor.

== Final marriage and death ==
Shortly before he died, Henry made provision for an allowance of £7,000 per year for Catherine to support herself. He further ordered that, after his death, Catherine, though a queen dowager, should be given the respect of a queen of England, as if he were still alive. After the coronation of her stepson, Edward VI, on 31 January 1547, Catherine retired from court to her home at Old Manor in Chelsea.

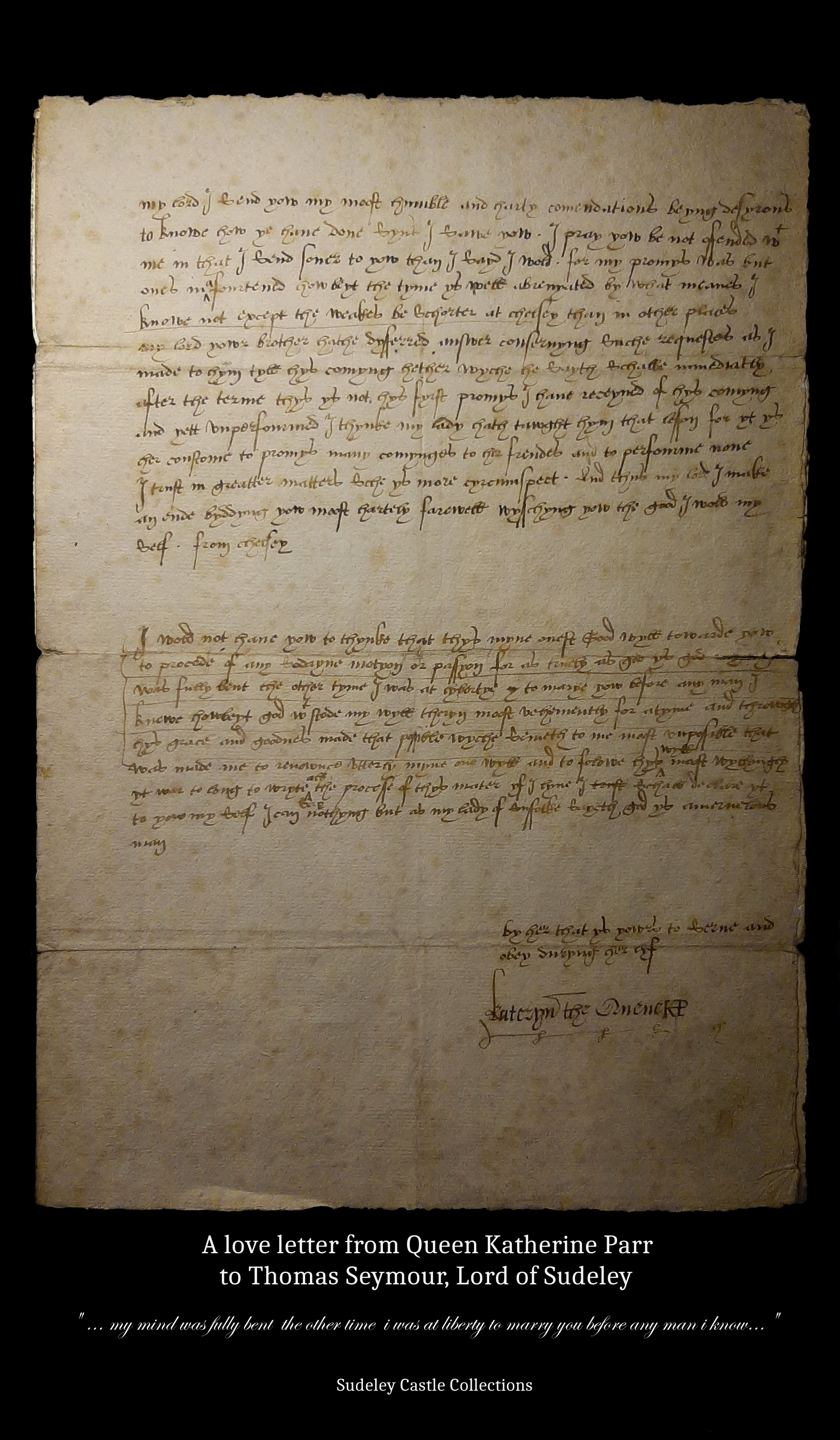
A letter from Catherine Parr to Thomas Seymour, declaring her love. On display at Sudeley Castle

Following Henry's death, Catherine's old love and the new king's uncle, Thomas Seymour (who was soon created 1st Baron Seymour of Sudeley), returned to court. Catherine was quick to accept when Seymour renewed his suit of marriage. Since only four months had passed since the death of King Henry, Seymour knew that the Regency council would not agree to a petition for the Queen Dowager to marry so soon. Sometime near the end of May, Catherine and Seymour married in secret. King Edward VI and the council were not informed of the union for several months. When their union became public knowledge, it caused a minor scandal. The King and Lady Mary were very much displeased by the union. After being censured and reprimanded by the council, Seymour wrote to the Lady Mary asking her to intervene on his behalf. Mary became furious at his forwardness and tasteless actions and refused to help. Mary even went as far as asking her half-sister, Lady Elizabeth, not to interact with Queen Catherine any further.

During this time, Catherine began having altercations with her brother-in-law, Edward Seymour, 1st Duke of Somerset. Like Thomas, Edward was the King's uncle, and was also the Lord Protector. A rivalry developed between Catherine and his wife, her own former lady-in-waiting, Anne Seymour, Duchess of Somerset, which became particularly acute over the matter of Catherine's jewels. The Duchess argued that Catherine, as queen dowager, was no longer entitled to wear the jewels belonging to the wife of the king. Instead she, as the wife of the protector, should be the one to wear them. The whole ordeal left her relationship with Catherine permanently damaged; the relationship between the two Seymour brothers also worsened as a result, since Thomas saw the whole dispute as a personal attack by his brother on his social standing.

In November 1547, Catherine published her third book, The Lamentation of a Sinner. The book promoted the Protestant concept of justification by faith alone, which the Catholic Church deemed to be heresy. It was sponsored by Katherine Brandon, Duchess of Suffolk, and by William Parr (Catherine's brother), and William Cecil, Elizabeth I's future chief minister, wrote the preface. In 1544 or 1545, Parr had started to organise an English translation of Erasmus's Paraphrases Upon the New Testament, and the massive volume was finally printed in January 1548. Parr had enlisted Nicholas Udall, Thomas Keyes and Mary Tudor to translate different sections and she may have produced the paraphrase of Matthew. In July 1547 the Edwardian state ordered every parish to obtain a copy and many generations of literate parishioners would have encountered lengthy dedications praising Parr's learning, her commitment to the vernacular Bible, and her role in the English reformation. Parr owned many books and she participated in the cultural practice of writing in her books and signing books that belonged to others.

At the age of 35, Catherine became pregnant. This pregnancy was a surprise, as Catherine had not conceived during her first three marriages. During this time, Seymour began to take an interest in Lady Elizabeth. Seymour had reputedly plotted to marry her before marrying Catherine, and it was reported later that Catherine discovered the two in an embrace. On a few occasions before the situation risked getting completely out of hand, according to the deposition of Kat Ashley, Catherine appears not only to have acquiesced in episodes of horseplay, but actually to have assisted her husband. Whatever actually happened, Elizabeth was sent away in May 1548 to stay with Sir Anthony Denny's household at Cheshunt and never saw her stepmother again, although the two corresponded. Elizabeth immediately wrote a letter to the Queen and Seymour after she left Chelsea. The letter demonstrates a sort of remorse.

Kat Ashley, whose deposition was given after Catherine had died and Seymour had been arrested for another attempt at marrying Lady Elizabeth, encouraged her charge to "play along", even commenting that Elizabeth would be lucky to have a husband like Seymour. Ashley told Elizabeth that Seymour had confided to her that he had wanted to marry Elizabeth before he married Catherine. After Catherine's death, Ashley strongly encouraged Elizabeth to write to Seymour offering her condolences; to "comfort him of his sorrow...for he would think great kindness therein."

In June 1548, Catherine, accompanied by Lady Jane Grey, moved to Sudeley Castle in Gloucestershire. The dowager queen promised to provide education for her. It was there that Catherine would spend the last few months of her pregnancy and the last summer of her life.

Catherine gave birth to her only child, a daughter, Mary Seymour, named after Catherine's stepdaughter Mary, on 30 August 1548. Catherine died on 5 September 1548, at Sudeley Castle, from what is thought to have been "childbed fever". This illness was common due to the lack of hygiene around childbirth.

Catherine's funeral was held on 7 September 1548. It was the first Protestant funeral held in English. Her chief mourner was Lady Jane Grey. She was buried in St. Mary's Chapel on the grounds of Sudeley Castle, Gloucestershire, England.

Thomas Seymour was beheaded for treason on 20 March 1549 and Mary Seymour was taken to live with the Dowager Duchess of Suffolk, a close friend of Catherine's. Catherine's other jewels were kept in a coffer with five drawers at Sudeley and this was sent to the Tower of London on 20 April 1549, and her clothes and papers followed in May. After a year and a half, on 17 March 1550, Mary's property was restored to her by the Restitution of Mary Seymour Act 1549 (3 & 4 Edw. 6. c. 14), easing the burden of the infant's household on the Duchess. The last mention of Mary Seymour on record is on her second birthday, and although stories circulated that she eventually married and had children, most historians believe she died as a child at Grimsthorpe Castle in Lincolnshire.

== Remains ==
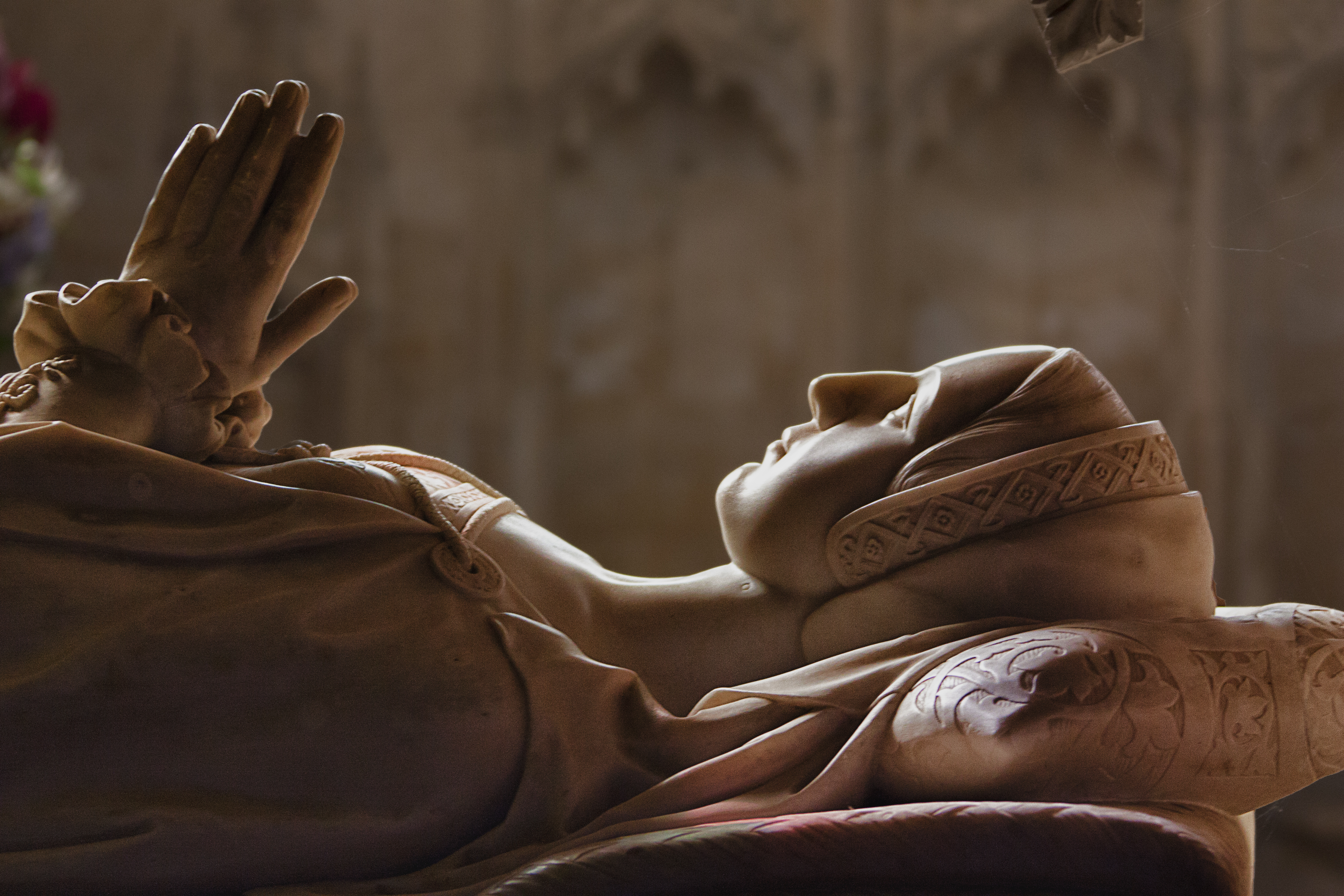
Detail from tomb of Catherine Parr in St. Mary's Chapel, Sudeley Castle

During the English Civil War, Sudeley Castle was used as a base by King Charles I, leading to its siege and sack by Parliamentarians in January 1643, during which Catherine's grave was probably disturbed and her monument destroyed. Contemporary writer Bruno Ryves reported that:

"There is in the castle a goodly fair church, here they dug up the graves, and disturb the ashes of the dead, they break down the monuments of the Chandoses".

The castle changed hands several times during the war, suffering a second siege, before being slighted in 1649, leading to it being largely abandoned, and the royal grave lost.

Catherine's presence at the castle was first rediscovered by the antiquarian Rev. Huggett when researching at the College of Arms, passing his findings onto George Pitt, 1st Baron Rivers, the owner of the castle in 1768.

Joseph Lucas, a member of the local gentry who dwelled in the outer court of the castle, renting it from Baron Rivers, was aware of Huggett's work and searched for the lost grave, discovering it among the ruins of the chapel in 1782. An account of the discovery was later published in Notes and Queries by the daughter of a Mr. Brooks, who had been present at the discovery.

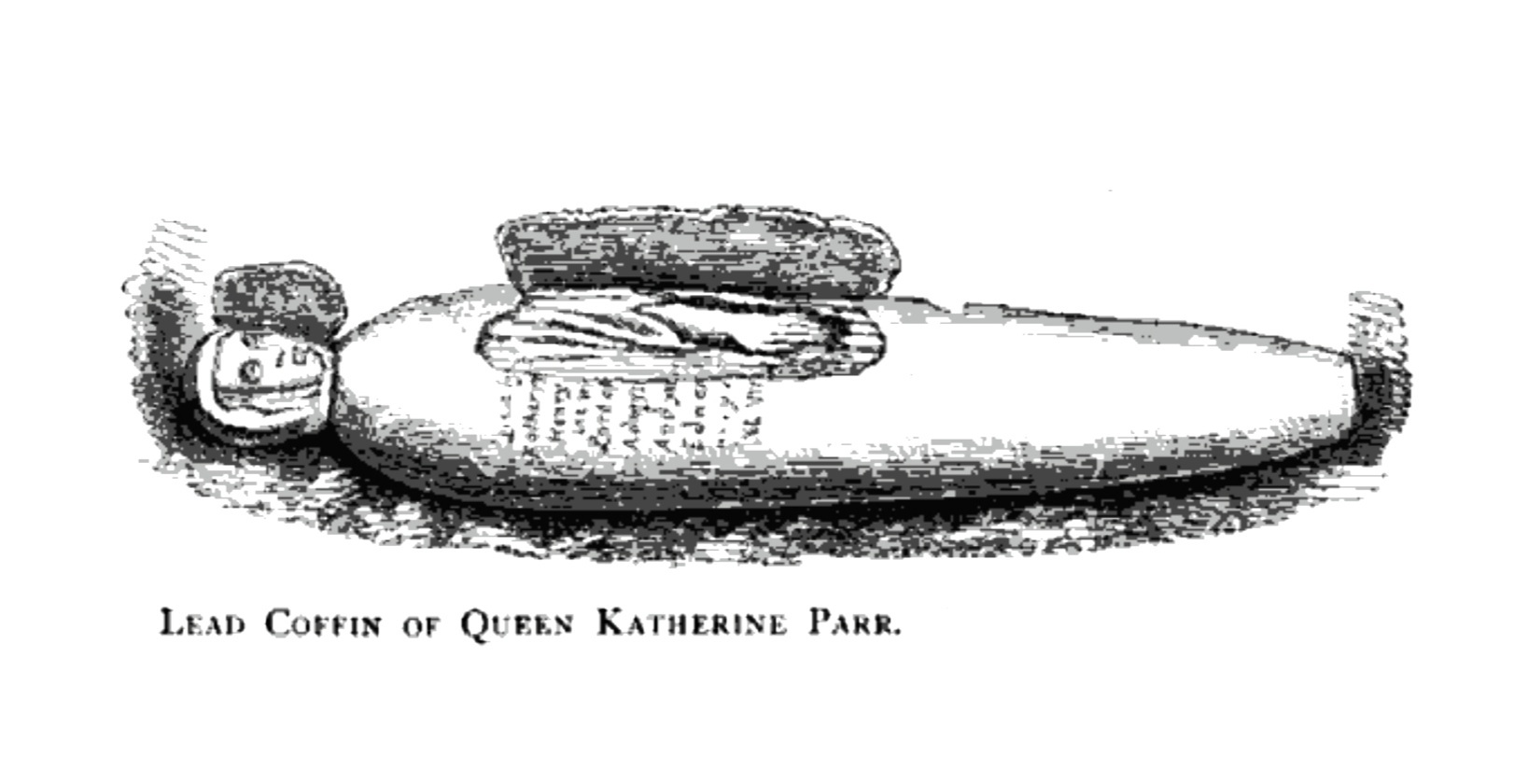
An illustration of the opening of Catherine Parr's coffin in 1782

"In the summer of the year 1782 the earth in which Qu. K. Par lay inter'd was removed, and at the depth of about two feet (or very little more) her leaden coffin or coffin was found quite whole... Mr. Jno Lucas had the curiosity to rip up the top of the coffin, expecting to discover within it only the bones of the deceased, but to his great surprise found the whole body wrapped in 6 or 7 seer cloth linen, entire and uncorrupted... his unwarranted curiosity led him to make an incision through the seer cloth which covered one of the arms of the corpse, the flesh of which at the time was white and moist".

The coffin was reopened in 1783, 1784, 1786; and in 1792, when local vandals broke into the coffin and threw the corpse in a rubbish heap, leading to Lucas reinterring the body in a hidden, walled grave.

The first time the coffin had been reopened by John Lucas had left Catherine with a piece of her hair and a tooth missing, and parts of the fabric of her clothing missing. Lucas used this evidence to tell the locals about his discovery, which led to the tomb being reopened repeatedly.

The last time the coffin was opened was in 1817 when the local rector decided to move it to the crypt under the chapel. When opening it this final time, it was found the body had been reduced to a skeleton, and much of the coffin was filled with ivy.

During these various openings of the coffin, fragments of Catherine's dress and locks of her hair were collected, one of which was gifted to Elizabeth Hamilton. The majority of these items are now on display at Sudeley Castle.

The coffin was last moved in 1861 to its final location in the fully restored chapel, under a canopied neo-Gothic tomb designed by Sir George Gilbert Scott, with a recumbent marble figure by John Birnie Philip.

== Iconography ==
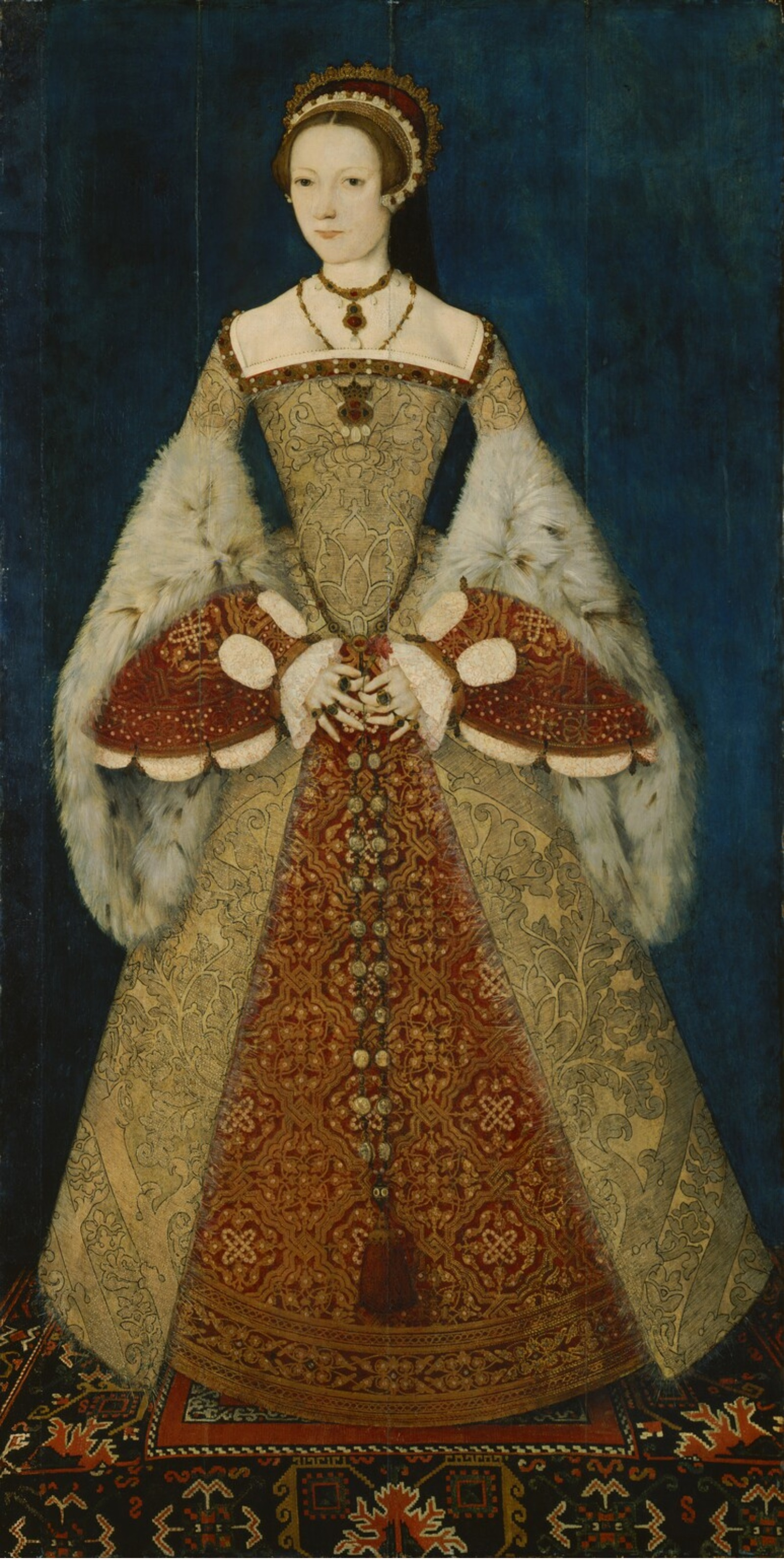
This portrait, originally, and now identified as Catherine Parr, was wrongly identified as Lady Jane Grey for decades.

The full-length portrait of Catherine Parr by Master John in the National Portrait Gallery was for many years thought to represent Lady Jane Grey. The painting has recently been re-identified as Catherine Parr, with whose name it was originally associated. The full-length format was very rare in portraits of this date, and was usually used only for very important sitters. Lady Jane Grey, although of royal blood, was a relatively obscure child of eight when this was painted (c. 1545); it was to be another eight years before the short-lived attempt at placing her on the throne. The distinctive crown-shaped jewel the sitter wears can be traced to an inventory of jewels that belonged to Catherine Parr, and the cameo beads appear to have belonged to Catherine Howard, from whom they would have passed to her successor as queen.

Another contemporary painting of Catherine Parr by Master John was likely painted in c.1547–1548, and in the past mistakenly labelled as Mary I or Lady Jane Grey. The painting, from the collection of the earls of Jersey, was thought to be lost in a fire by 1969, but was auctioned at Sotheby's in July 2023.

== Historiography ==
The popular myth that Catherine Parr acted more as her husband's nurse than his wife was born in the 19th century from the work of Victorian moralist and proto-feminist Agnes Strickland. David Starkey challenged this assumption in his book Six Wives, in which he points out that such a situation would have been vaguely obscene to the Tudors—given that Henry had a huge staff of physicians waiting on him hand and foot, and Catherine was expected to live up to the heavy expectations of queenly dignity.

Catherine has earned many admirers among historians. These include Starkey, feminist activist Karen Lindsey, Lady Antonia Fraser, Alison Weir, Carolly Erickson, Alison Plowden, Susan James and Linda Porter. Biographers have described her as strong-willed and outspoken, physically desirable, susceptible (like Queen Elizabeth) to roguish charm, and even willing to resort to obscene language if the occasion suited.

== In media ==
=== On film ===
- In 1933, Everley Gregg played Parr opposite Charles Laughton's Henry VIII in Alexander Korda's highly acclaimed film The Private Life of Henry VIII.
- In the 1953 film Young Bess, Deborah Kerr played Catherine Parr, also starring Charles Laughton as Henry VIII.
- In 1972, the film Henry VIII and His Six Wives was released, adapted from the BBC series, in which Keith Michell reprised his role as Henry; on this occasion Parr was played by Barbara Leigh-Hunt.
- In 2023 British historical drama Firebrand, based on the 2013 novel Queen's Gambit by Elizabeth Fremantle, Parr was played by Alicia Vikander. The film focuses on Catherine Parr.

=== On TV ===
- As part of the 1970 BBC series The Six Wives of Henry VIII, Henry was played by Keith Michell, and Parr by Rosalie Crutchley. She reprised her role in its sequel series, Elizabeth R (1971).
- In 2000 collection of television comedy sketches The Nearly Complete and Utter History of Everything Parr was played by Julia Sawalha.
- In 2003 in the two-part ITV drama Henry VIII, Ray Winstone starred as the King. Parr was played by Clare Holman.
- Joely Richardson portrayed Parr in season 4 (2010) of the television series The Tudors, produced for Showtime.
- In 2022 Starz series Becoming Elizabeth Parr was played by Jessica Raine.

=== Documentaries ===
- In 2001 David Starkey's documentary series The Six Wives of Henry VIII Parr was played by Caroline Lintott.
- In 2016 documentary series Henry VIII and his Six Wives and in 2017 documentary series Elizabeth I on Channel 5 with Suzannah Lipscomb and Dan Jones Parr was played by Kate Holderness .
- In 2016 documentary series Six Wives with Lucy Worsley Parr was played by Alice Patten.

=== In literature ===
- The Female Advocate; a poem occasioned by reading Mr. Duncombe's Feminead (1775) by Mary Scott. The poem is celebratory; it rehearses the accomplishments of women writers of the mid-eighteenth-century and introduces a series of women from the previous two centuries, beginning with Catherine Parr.
- Henry VIII and His Court (1867) by Luise Mühlbach. The novel focuses on Catherine Parr as sixth wife of King Henry VIII.
- The Sixth Wife (1953) by Jean Plaidy.
- Wife in Waiting (1989) by Maureen Peters.
- Queen's Gambit: A Novel of Katherine Parr(2013) by Elizabeth Fremantle.
- The Taming of the Queen (2015) by Philippa Gregory, which focuses on Catherine Parr.
- Katherine Parr: The Sixth Wife (2021) by Alison Weir.

=== In theatre ===
- The West End/Broadway musical Six (musical), written by Toby Marlow and Lucy Moss, with Catherine Parr played by Maiya Quansah-Breed in the UK tour and original cast.

== Notes ==
English royalty
Vacant Title last held by Catherine Howard	Queen consort of England; 12 July 1543 – 28 January 1547	Vacant Title next held by Anne of Denmark
Crown of Ireland Act 1542	Queen consort of Ireland; 12 July 1543 – 28 January 1547	Vacant Title next held by Anne of Denmark
