= Lucy Moss =

British writer-director-composer

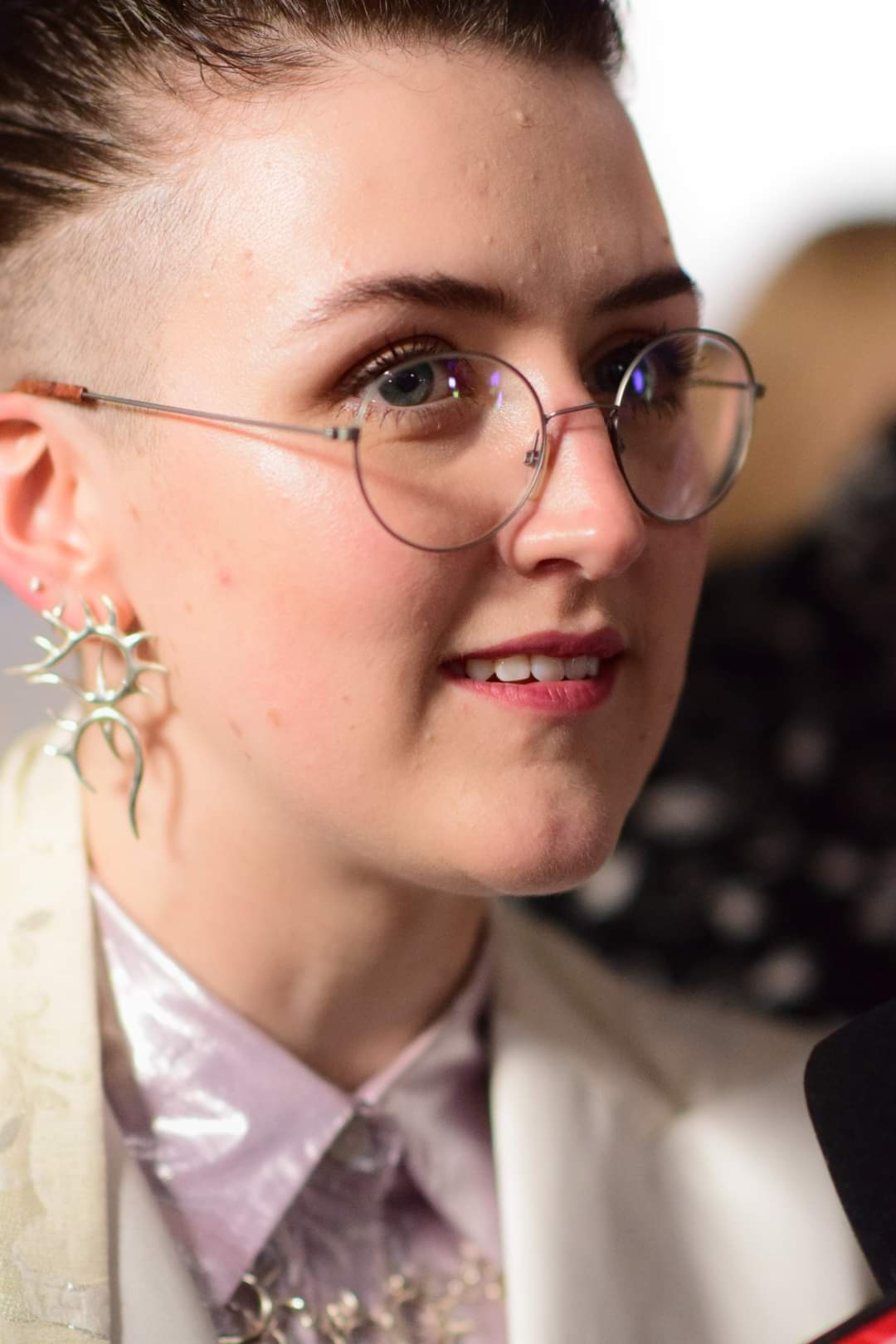
- Moss at the 75th Tony Awards in 2022
- Born: Lucy Amelia Nancy Moss; 13 January 1994 (age 32); Hammersmith, London, England
- Education: Gonville and Caius College, Cambridge (BA)
- Occupations: Writer; director; composer; playwright; lyricist
- Writing career
- Years active: 2014–present
- Notable works: Six; Hot Gay Time Machine; Why Am I So Single?
- Notable awards: Tony Award for Best Original Score

Lucy Amelia Nancy Moss (born 13 January 1994) is a British musical theatre composer, lyricist, playwright, writer, and director best known for co-creating the hit musical Six with Toby Marlow. As director of most Six productions, Moss became the youngest ever female director of a Broadway musical at 26.

For its West End run, Six was voted Best New Musical of the Decade by readers of WhatsOnStage and received five Olivier Award nominations. Nominated for a Tony Award for Best Direction of a Musical with Jamie Armitage, Moss alongside Marlow won the Tony Award for Best Original Score in 2022.

Before theatres reopened in 2021, Moss directed the virtual benefit performance of Ratatouille: The TikTok Musical. In 2022, Moss directed a new production of Legally Blonde: The Musical at Regent's Park Open Air Theatre in London.

== Early life and education ==
Moss grew up in Ealing, West London. Her father, Robert Moss, was a fund manager who died when Lucy was 14. Her mother Julie is a tax adviser. Lucy became interested in musical theatre and dance through her local ballet school. Lucy attended St Paul's Girls' School in Hammersmith, graduating in 2011. She attended Laine Theatre Arts for two years, during which she worked as a cage dancer at Cyberdog in Camden Market.

Moss then attended Gonville and Caius College, Cambridge. Much of her focus was on feminist and revisionist history. During her first year, Moss co-directed the Cambridge Amateur Dramatic Club production of Road at the ADC Theatre, which led to her first meeting with Toby Marlow, who was in the audience. In 2015, she was an assistant director for Ajax440, a student play about game addiction, which Marlow appeared in. That year, she also appeared as a dancer in a Cambridge University Amateur Dramatic Club production of the musical Rent, which featured Marlow and Zak Ghazi-Torbati in leading roles.

== Career ==
=== Six ===
Lucy Moss and Toby Marlow co-created Six while in their final year at Cambridge. Marlow came up with the idea of a pop concert featuring the wives of Henry VIII and asked Moss to help write it, after being offered a slot at the Edinburgh Festival Fringe by the Cambridge University Musical Theatre Society. They put together the basic concepts of the show within ten nonconsecutive days, over a period of six months. As Moss explained to Vogue, “It’s not like I do the lyrics and Toby does the music. We sit in a room and work it out together.” Marlow had originally envisioned more "generic" pop songs that could stand alone as singles, but Moss suggested putting more historical references into the songs. In an interview with The Stage, she said, "We realised as we wrote it that it would be funnier and more interesting like that, and that you could not tell the story without it." As she later told The New York Times, after watching the BBC documentary series Six Wives with Lucy Worsley, Moss realised, "'Ooh, I think this could be cool, as a feminist thing. There is a different take on the wives, and there is this historical wrong to be redressed.'” Although Marlow is a Hamilton "superfan" who wrote their dissertation on the musical, Moss made a decision not to listen to any of the songs from Hamilton, to avoid being influenced by it. On their first day of writing, Moss and Marlow watched Beyoncé's 2011 video album, Live at Roseland: Elements of 4, which provided inspiration on how to weave storytelling into a concert performance.

In addition to co-writing the musical, Moss choreographed the premiere of SiX – Divorced. Beheaded. Live! at the 2017 Edinburgh Fringe. Rating it a "'must see' show of outstanding quality", FringeReview said that "whoever came up with the choreography deserves a large round of applause too as it was different for each number, appropriate to the mood and the music and faultlessly executed." Another review in Broadway Baby described SiX as "a brazen, glamorous and truly unforgettable history lesson". The show immediately received interest from producers. Following additional performances at Cambridge, Moss and Marlow received financial backing from a team including George Stiles, Kenny Wax, and Wendy and Andy Barnes. Six was "redesigned, reorchestrated and recast", with Moss moving into the role of co-director with Jamie Armitage, and Carrie-Anne Ingrouille as the choreographer.

Lucy Moss is co-director of Six on the West End and on Broadway, together with Armitage. She is also co-director of most other productions of Six, including the UK & Ireland, North America, and Australia & New Zealand tours. On 31 January 2020, The Stage announced that Moss had broken the record for youngest female director of a Broadway musical, at the age of 26. The record had previously been held by Elizabeth Swados, who was 27 when she directed Runaways in 1978.

Six received five nominations in the 2019 Olivier Awards, in categories including Best New Musical and Outstanding Achievement in Music for Marlow, Moss, Tom Curran, and Joe Beighton. In December 2019, Six was voted Best New Musical of the Decade by readers of WhatsOnStage. In August 2019, Lucy Moss and Toby Marlow signed a deal with Warner Chappell Music to take the songs from Six to "even more fans worldwide". By February 2020, the cast recording of Six the Musical had reached 100 million streams on Spotify and Apple Music, making it the second most streamed musical theatre album after Hamilton the Musical.

=== Hot Gay Time Machine ===
Her second collaboration with Marlow was on Hot Gay Time Machine, which they created together with Zak Ghazi-Torbati. Moss directed and co-wrote the show, which was sold out at Edinburgh Fringe 2017 and 2018. Between 2017 and 2021, the musical comedy cabaret show has had limited runs at The Other Palace Studio, Trafalgar Studios, and Soho Theatre. Hot Gay Time Machine won the Brighton Fringe Award for Excellence 2017.

=== Ratatouille: The TikTok Musical ===
In December 2020, Lucy Moss directed Ratatouille: The TikTok Musical, which was pre-filmed and streamed as a virtual performance while most theaters remained closed during the COVID-19 pandemic. Premiering on New Year's Day 2021, the show raised a record $2 million for The Actors Fund, selling 350,000 tickets. According to producer Greg Nobile, he and writers Michael Breslin and Patrick Foley quickly agreed on Moss as their first choice for director. The show included the entire Broadway cast of Six, as an ensemble of "Rat Queens", and incorporated several tributes to Six.

Prior to the broadcast, Moss told The New York Times that although the crowdsourced origins of Ratatouille the Musical had been "on the cutting edge of tech and the most Gen-Z thing in the world", its creators still aspired for it to be as much like a "classical musical" as possible, albeit "in the least theatrical space ever – online". She described her vision for the production as "a Zoom reading or an online concert that drank 20 Red Bulls and spit on the screen."

=== Legally Blonde: The Musical ===
On 16 March 2022, Lucy Moss was announced as director of a new production of Legally Blonde at the Regent's Park Open Air Theatre in London. The show featured former Six cast member Courtney Bowman, who played Anne Boleyn on the West End, and ran from 13 May to 2 July.
