= Gabrielle Tana =

British film producer

Gabrielle Tana is a British film producer.

== Early life ==
Tana's father was famous restaurateur and film producer Dan Tana.

== Career ==
Tana and her fellow producers were nominated for an Academy Award for Best Picture for the 2013 film Philomena.

== Filmography ==
- Someone Else's America (1995)
- Animals (1998)
- On the Ropes (1999)
- The Moth (2002)
- The Duchess (2008)
- Coriolanus (2011)
- The Invisible Woman (2013)
- Philomena (2013)
- Run (short) (2013)
- Dancer (Documentary) (2016)
- Mindhorn (2016)
- Ideal Home (2018)
- The White Crow (2018)
- Stan & Ollie (2018)
- My Zoe (2019)
- The Dig (2021)
- Thirteen Lives (2022)
- A Talent for Murder (2026)
- Elsinore (2027)
