= List of Guggenheim Fellowships awarded in 1972 =

Three hundred and seventy-two scholars, artists, and scientists received Guggenheim Fellowships in 1972. $3,819,000 was disbursed between the recipients, who were chosen from an applicant pool of 2,506. Of the 96 universities represented, University of California, Berkeley had the most winners on its faculty (24), with Harvard University (22) claiming second and Stanford University (12) claiming third. Argentine writer Haroldo Conti refused his award, referring to it as "penetración cultural del imperialismo norteamericano" ("cultural penetration by North American imperialism").

== 1972 United States and Canadian fellows ==
Category	Field of Study	Fellow	Institutional association	Research topic	Notes	Ref
Creative Arts	Choreography	William A. Dunas		Choreographing		
Creative Arts	Choreography	Lar Lubovitch	Lar Lubovitch Dance Company	Choreographing		
Creative Arts	Choreography	Eleo Pomare		Choreographing		
Creative Arts	Drama and Performance Art	Kenneth Bernard	Long Island University			
Creative Arts	Drama and Performance Art	Maria Irene Fornes				
Creative Arts	Drama and Performance Art	Wilford Leach	La MaMa; Sarah Lawrence College			
Creative Arts	Drama and Performance Art	Jerome Max				
Creative Arts	Drama and Performance Art	Robert S. Montgomery				
Creative Arts	Drama and Performance Art	Lanford Wilson		The Hot l Baltimore		
Creative Arts	Fiction	Peter S. Beagle		Writing		
Creative Arts	Fiction	Christopher Davis		Writing		
Creative Arts	Fiction	E. L. Doctorow	Sarah Lawrence College	Ragtime		
Creative Arts	Fiction	Paula Fox		Writing		
Creative Arts	Fiction	Ernest J. Gaines		Writing		
Creative Arts	Fiction	Edmund Keeley	Princeton University	Writing	Also won in 1959	
Creative Arts	Fiction	James A. McPherson		Writing		
Creative Arts	Fiction	James T. Whitehead	University of Arkansas	Writing		
Creative Arts	Fiction	Geoffrey Wolff		Writing	Also won in 1977	
Creative Arts	Fiction	Sol Yurick		Writing		
Creative Arts	Film	Robert Beavers		Filmmaking		
Creative Arts	Film	Robert Kaylor		Carny		
Creative Arts	Film	Standish D. Lawder	Yale University	Filmmaking		
Creative Arts	Film	David Cooke MacDougall		Turkana Conversations Trilogy		
Creative Arts	Film	Edward R. Pincus	Massachusetts Institute of Technology	Filmmaking		
Creative Arts	Film	Michael Snow		Filmmaking		
Creative Arts	Fine Arts	Seymour Boardman		Painting		
Creative Arts	Fine Arts	Mel Bochner				
Creative Arts	Fine Arts	John Ireland Collins		Painting: Land and seascapes of Maine		
Creative Arts	Fine Arts	Dominick Di Meo		Painting		
Creative Arts	Fine Arts	Walter Ferro		Graphics		
Creative Arts	Fine Arts	Edward Giobbi		Graphics		
Creative Arts	Fine Arts	Robert Arthur Goodnough		Painting		
Creative Arts	Fine Arts	Maxwell Hendler	California State University, Long Beach	Painting		
Creative Arts	Fine Arts	Jerald W. Jacquard	University of Illinois Chicago	Sculpture		
Creative Arts	Fine Arts	Lester Johnson	Yale University	Painting		
Creative Arts	Fine Arts	Alex Katz		Painting		
Creative Arts	Fine Arts	Rockne Krebs		The Smoke Drawings series		
Creative Arts	Fine Arts	Bernard Langlais		Sculpture		
Creative Arts	Fine Arts	Dennis A. Oppenheim		Sculpture		
Creative Arts	Fine Arts	Peter Plagens	California State University, Northridge	Painting		
Creative Arts	Fine Arts	James L. Prestini	University of California, Berkeley	Sculpture		
Creative Arts	Fine Arts	Dorothea Rockburne		Painting		
Creative Arts	Fine Arts	Jim Sullivan	Bard College	Painting		
Creative Arts	Fine Arts	Julius Tobias		Sculpture	Also won in 1978	
Creative Arts	Music Composition	Carla Bley		Composing		
Creative Arts	Music Composition	Paul Cooper	University of Cincinnati – College-Conservatory of Music	Composing	Also won in 1965	
Creative Arts	Music Composition	Robert Di Domenica	New England Conservatory of Music	Composing		
Creative Arts	Music Composition	Charles M. Dodge	Columbia University	Composing	Also won in 1975	
Creative Arts	Music Composition	James Mulcro Drew	Yale University	Composing		
Creative Arts	Music Composition	Keith Jarrett		Composing		
Creative Arts	Music Composition	Donald H. Keats	Antioch College	Composing	Also won in 1964	
Creative Arts	Music Composition	William Kraft	Los Angeles Philharmonic	Composing	Also won in 1967	
Creative Arts	Music Composition	Ann McMillan		Composing		
Creative Arts	Music Composition	Meredith Monk		Choreographic techniques	Also won in 1982	
Creative Arts	Music Composition	Dennis Riley	California State University, Fresno (visiting)	Composing		
Creative Arts	Music Composition	Sonny Rollins		Composing		
Creative Arts	Music Composition	George Russell		Composing	Also won in 1969	
Creative Arts	Music Composition	Roy Travis	University of California, Los Angeles	Composing		
Creative Arts	Music Composition	Mary Lou Williams		Composing	Also won in 1977	
Creative Arts	Music Composition	Charles Wuorinen	Manhattan School of Music	Composing	Also won in 1968	
Creative Arts	Photography	Harry Callahan	Rhode Island School of Design			
Creative Arts	Photography	Liliane de Cock				
Creative Arts	Photography	Kenneth B. Josephson	School of the Art Institute of Chicago			
Creative Arts	Photography	Fred W. McDarrah	The Village Voice			
Creative Arts	Photography	Roger Minick	University of California, Berkeley	Community in the Ozark Mountains (published as Hills of Home, 1975)		
Creative Arts	Photography	Thomas Porett	University of the Arts (Philadelphia)	Literary works in multimedia form		
Creative Arts	Photography	Keith A. Smith	School of the Art Institute of Chicago (visiting)		Also won in 1980	
Creative Arts	Photography	Geoffrey L. Winningham	Rice University		Also won in 1978	
Creative Arts	Poetry	Robert Bly		Writing	Also won in 1964	
Creative Arts	Poetry	Donald Davie	Stanford University	Writing	Also won in 1980	
Creative Arts	Poetry	Alan Dugan	Fine Arts Work Center	Writing	Also won in 1963	
Creative Arts	Poetry	Donald Hall	University of Michigan	Biography of Charles Laughton	Also won in 1963	
Creative Arts	Poetry	Charles Simic	California State College, Hayward	Writing		
Creative Arts	Poetry	W. D. Snodgrass	Syracuse University	Writing		
Creative Arts	Poetry	Mona Van Duyn		Writing		
Creative Arts	Poetry	Diane Wakoski		Writing		
Humanities	American Literature	Alfred Appel, Jr.	Northwestern University	Vladimir Nabokov		
Humanities	American Literature	Daniel M. Cory				
Humanities	American Literature	James M. Cox	Dartmouth College	American biography		
Humanities	American Literature	Joseph Katz	University of South Carolina	Complete edition of the works of Frank Norris		
Humanities	American Literature	Roger B. Salomon	Case Western Reserve University			
Humanities	Architecture, Planning and Design	F. Stuart Chapin Jr.	University of North Carolina at Chapel Hill	Human time allocation		
Humanities	Architecture, Planning and Design	David Robbins Coffin	Princeton University	Renaissance villas and gardens		
Humanities	Architecture, Planning and Design	Laurie D. Olin	University of Washington	English landscapes		
Humanities	Architecture, Planning and Design	Peter P. Rogers	Harvard University			
Humanities	Biography	Forrest G. Robinson	University of California, Santa Cruz	Henry Murray		
Humanities	British History	Richard Whitlock Davis	Washington University in St. Louis			
Humanities	British History	Harold J. Hanham	Harvard University	Breakup of traditional culture in the Scottish Highlands		
Humanities	British History	Stephen E. Koss	Barnard College			
Humanities	British History	Standish Meacham	University of Texas at Austin	English working-class attitudes, 1870 –1914		
Humanities	British History	Sheldon Rothblatt	University of California, Berkeley	Teachers and students at Oxford and Cambridge, 1760–1860		
Humanities	Classics	G. Karl Galinsky	University of Texas, Austin	Research at the American Academy in Rome		
Humanities	Classics	Peter D. A. Garnsey	University of California, Berkeley	Aristocracy in the cities of the Roman Empire		
Humanities	Classics	Herbert Hoffmann	Museum für Kunst und Gewerbe Hamburg		Also won in 1961	
Humanities	Classics	Michael J. O'Brien	University of Toronto			
Humanities	East Asian Studies	Charlotte Furth	California State University, Long Beach	Study of Chang Ping-Lin		
Humanities	East Asian Studies	William R. Roff	Columbia University	Analytical history of the Islamic institutions in the Malay States, 1800 –1950		
Humanities	East Asian Studies	Holmes Hinkley Welch	Harvard University	Research in Kyoto		
Humanities	East Asian Studies	Oliver W. Wolters	Cornell University	History of Vietnam from the 10th to the 14th centuries		
Humanities	Economic History	Albert Fishlow	University of California, Berkeley	Comparative studies of economic development in England, the United States, and Brazil		
Humanities	Economic History	Robert E. Gallman	University of North Carolina at Chapel Hill			
Humanities	Economic History	Douglass C. North	University of Washington			
Humanities	English Literature	Ward Sykes Allen	Auburn University	Translators for the King James Bible		
Humanities	English Literature	Morris Beja	Ohio State University	Disassociation of personality in 20th-century fiction		
Humanities	English Literature	Edward Brandabur	University of Illinois Urbana-Champaign			
Humanities	English Literature	Michael G. Cooke	Yale University	Concept of will in English romantic literature		
Humanities	English Literature	Thomas Robert Edwards Jr.	Rutgers University	Writing a book about Jane Austen		
Humanities	English Literature	James Robert de Jage Jackson	Victoria University, Toronto			
Humanities	English Literature	Thomas Kranidas	Stony Brook University	Milton's prose		
Humanities	English Literature	Dan H. Laurence		George Bernard Shaw and the American theater	Also won in 1960, 1961	
Humanities	English Literature	Edwin Wilson Marrs Jr.	University of Pittsburgh	Edition of the letters of Charles and Mary Lamb		
Humanities	English Literature	Anne Kostelanetz Mellor	Stanford University	Philosophical concept of romantic irony in English literature	Also won in 1983	
Humanities	English Literature	Janel M. Mueller	University of Chicago			
Humanities	English Literature	Morton D. Paley	University of California, Berkeley	Critical study of William Blake's Jerusalem	Also won in 1986	
Humanities	English Literature	David Dodd Perkins	Harvard University		Also won in 1961	
Humanities	English Literature	Clyde de Loache Ryals	University of Pennsylvania	Browning's later poetry		
Humanities	English Literature	Charles Richard Sanders	Duke University	Duke-Edinburgh edition of The Collected Letters of Thomas and Jane Carlyle	Also won in 1960	
Humanities	English Literature	Donald S. Taylor	University of Oregon			
Humanities	English Literature	Thomas Vargish	Dartmouth University	Religious background of Victorian fiction		
Humanities	English Literature	Raymond B. Waddington	University of Wisconsin, Madison	Iconography and mythology of Shakespeare's Sonnets		
Humanities	English Literature	Ian Pierre Watt	Stanford University	Critical study of Joseph Conrad	Also won in 1958	
Humanities	Film, Video, and Radio Studies	A. J. Liehm	Richmond College, CUNY	History of East European cinema, 1945–1970		
Humanities	Film, Video, and Radio Studies	Drahomíra N. Liehm-Novotná	The New School for Social Research	History of East European cinema, 1945–1970		
Humanities	Fine Arts Research	Svetlana Alpers	University of California, Berkeley	Low life figures in 17th-century art		
Humanities	Fine Arts Research	James F. Cahill	University of California, Berkeley	Early Nanga paintings in Japan and its Chinese sources		
Humanities	Fine Arts Research	Jacques de Caso	University of California, Berkeley	French sculpture, 1770–1870		
Humanities	Fine Arts Research	John Elderfield		Aesthetic and ideological relationships in abstract art		
Humanities	Fine Arts Research	Edward F. Fry	Yale University	Theory and influence of Cubist sculpture		
Humanities	Fine Arts Research	Howard Hibbard	Columbia University	Bernini's Altieri chapel	Also won in 1965	
Humanities	Fine Arts Research	William Innes Homer	University of Delaware	Alfred Stieglitz		
Humanities	Fine Arts Research	Ronald W. Hunt	Emily Carr University of Art and Design	Theory and history of the utopian role of art in 20th-century art and politics		
Humanities	Fine Arts Research	Herbert L. Kessler	University of Chicago	Research at the Institute for Advanced Studies		
Humanities	Fine Arts Research	John M. Rosenfield	Harvard University	Research in Kyoto		
Humanities	Folklore and Popular Culture	Gerard H. Béhague	University of Illinois Urbana-Champaign			
Humanities	Folklore and Popular Culture	Henry H. Glassie III	Indiana University	Comparative study of the compositional dynamics of folk architecture		
Humanities	French History	John F. Bosher	York University	Role of financiers and businessmen in the French administration of Canada		
Humanities	French History	George Huppert	University of Illinois Chicago	Social structure of 16th-century French elites		
Humanities	French Literature	Mary Ann Caws	Hunter College			
Humanities	French Literature	Anne Greet Cushing	University of California, Santa Barbara	Artistic collaboration of Paul Eluard and a group of famous modern painters, including Max Ernst and Pablo Picasso		
Humanities	French Literature	Marc Hanrez	University of Wisconsin–Madison			
Humanities	French Literature	Rima Drell Reck	Louisiana State University	World War II and the French novel		
Humanities	French Literature	Rémy Gilbert Saisselin	University of Rochester	Imagination of the "Generation of 1967"		
Humanities	General Nonfiction	Nat Hentoff	New York University; The Village Voice	Education		
Humanities	General Nonfiction	Jessica Mitford		Examination of the American penal system		
Humanities	German and East European History	Mack Walker	Cornell University	Biography of Johann Jakob Moser	Declined award; also won in 1999	
Humanities	German and Scandinavian Literature	Theodore M. Andersson	Harvard University			
Humanities	German and Scandinavian Literature	Sander L. Gilman	Cornell University	Edition of the works of Friedrich Maximilian von Klinger		
Humanities	History of Science and Technology	George B. Kauffman	California State University, Fresno	Chemical-historical study of Alfred Werner's coordination theory		
Humanities	Iberian and Latin American History	Stanley J. Stein	Princeton University	Merchants and monarchs in Spain and New Spain, 1759-1829	Also won in 1958	
Humanities	Iberian and Latin American History	Joan Connelly Ullman	University of Washington	Pablo Iglesias Posse		
Humanities	Latin American History	Richard Graham	University of Texas at Austin	Interest-group politics in Brazil, 1830 –1930		
Humanities	Linguistics	Geoffrey L. Bursill-Hall	Simon Fraser University	History of linguistics in the Middle Ages		
Humanities	Linguistics	Winfred P. Lehmann	University of Texas at Austin	Creation of a Proto-Indo-European syntax		
Humanities	Linguistics	Arnold M. Zwicky	Ohio State University	Survey of phonological processes		
Humanities	Literary Criticism	Wallace W. Douglas	Northwestern University	History of the teaching of English composition in the United States	Also won in 1953	
Humanities	Literary Criticism	Robert W. Hanning	Columbia University	Relationship between art and reality in Renaissance literature and art		
Humanities	Literary Criticism	Naomi Lebowitz	Washington University in St. Louis			
Humanities	Literary Criticism	Vivian H. Mercier	University of Colorado			
Humanities	Literary Criticism	Ralph W. Rader	University of California, Berkeley	Generic aspect of literary form		
Humanities	Literary Criticism	Edward W. Said	Columbia University	Modern Arabic and European cultures		
Humanities	Literary Criticism	Monroe K. Spears	Rice University		Also won in 1965	
Humanities	Literary Criticism	Ramón Xirau Subias	University of the Americas; Universidad Nacional Autónoma de México	Materialism and humanism	Also won in 1967	
Humanities	Medieval History	Charles M. Brand	Bryn Mawr College	Administrative history of the Byzantine Empire under the Comneni and Angeli, 1081–1204		
Humanities	Medieval History	Ira M. Lapidus	University of California, Berkeley	Biography of Ibn Khaldun		
Humanities	Medieval History	Bryce D. Lyon	Brown University		Also won in 1954	
Humanities	Music Research	Anthony A. Newcomb	Harvard University			
Humanities	Near Eastern Studies	Moshe Held	Columbia University; Jewish Theological Seminary of America	Mesopotamian proverbs		
Humanities	Near Eastern Studies	Jacob Lassner	Wayne State University	Islamic armies and urban development in the early Middle Ages		
Humanities	Near Eastern Studies	Wilferd Madelung	University of Chicago	Islamic religious history, 8th to 15th centuries		
Humanities	Near Eastern Studies	Karl H. Menges	Columbia University			
Humanities	Philosophy	Jerrold J. Katz	Massachusetts Institute of Technology			
Humanities	Philosophy	Charles E. Osgood	University of Illinois Urbana-Champaign		Also won in 1955	
Humanities	Philosophy	Kenneth F. Schaffner	University of Chicago			
Humanities	Philosophy	Israel Scheffler	Harvard University		Also won in 1958	
Humanities	Philosophy	Abner Shimony	Boston University			
Humanities	Philosophy	Avrum Stroll	University of California, San Diego	Statements and propositions		
Humanities	Religion	Alexander A. Di Lella	Catholic University of America	Critical edition of the Book of Proverbs in Syriac		
Humanities	Religion	Robert Gordis	Jewish Theological Seminary of America			
Humanities	Religion	James A. Sanders	Union Theological Seminary		Also won in 1961	
Humanities	Religion	George Huntston Williams	Harvard Divinity School	Research at the Catholic University of Lublin		
Humanities	Renaissance History	Donald E. Queller	University of Illinois Urbana-Champaign	Myth of the Venetian patriciate		
Humanities	Renaissance History	Gerald Strauss	Indiana University	Principles of pedagogy in the Reformation	Also won in 1964	
Humanities	Renaissance History	James D. Tracy	University of Minnesota	Significance of northern humanism as a reform movement, 1470-1520		
Humanities	Russian History	Terence Emmons	Stanford University	Formation of political parties in Russia, 1894–1906		
Humanities	Slavic Literature	John Mersereau Jr.	University of Michigan	Russian romantic fiction		
Humanities	Spanish and Portuguese Literature	Donald McGrady	University of Virginia	Reevaluation of the honor code in the theatre of Calderon		
Humanities	Spanish and Portuguese Literature	Juan Marichal	Harvard University	Biography of Juan Negrín	Also won in 1957	
Humanities	Spanish and Portuguese Literature	Ciriaco Morón Arroyo	Cornell University	History of 20th-century Spanish thought		
Humanities	Theatre Arts	Jan Kott	Stony Brook University			
Humanities	Theatre Arts	John A. Mills	Binghamton University	Stage history of Hamlet		
Humanities	United States History	Stanley Coben	University of California, Los Angeles	American culture in the 1920s		
Humanities	United States History	Carl N. Degler	Stanford University	History of women and the family in the United States		
Humanities	United States History	Nathan G. Hale Jr.	University of California, Riverside	Freud's influence on American culture in the 1920s		
Humanities	United States History	Andrew R. Hilen Jr.	University of Washington		Also won in 1954	
Humanities	United States History	Daniel Levine	Bowdoin College	Comparative study on the development of social welfare in Denmark and the United States		
Humanities	United States History	David Montgomery	University of Pittsburgh	Labor movement, 1880–1925		
Humanities	United States History	Irwin Unger	New York University			
Humanities	Theodore Allen Wilson	University of Kansas	Biography of Henry A. Wallace			
Natural Sciences	Applied Mathematics	George Bekefi	Massachusetts Institute of Technology	Research at the University of Paris and the Hebrew University of Jerusalem		
Natural Sciences	Applied Mathematics	David R. Kassoy	University of Colorado, Boulder			
Natural Sciences	Applied Mathematics	Leon M. Keer	Northwestern University			
Natural Sciences	Applied Mathematics	Wulf B. Kunkel	University of California, Berkeley	Physics of ionized gases	Also won in 1955	
Natural Sciences	Applied Mathematics	Paul A. Libby	University of California, San Diego	Fluid dynamics		
Natural Sciences	Applied Mathematics	Chiang C. Mei	Massachusetts Institute of Technology			
Natural Sciences	Applied Mathematics	Chaim L. Pekeris	Weizmann Institute of Science		Also won in 1946, 1968	
Natural Sciences	Applied Mathematics	Robert A. Rapp	Ohio State University	Electrochemical processes		
Natural Sciences	Applied Mathematics	Stuart C. Schwartz	Princeton University	Research at Technion		
Natural Sciences	Applied Mathematics	David N. Seidman	Cornell University	Studies of point defects in metals by field ion microscopy	Also won in 1980	
Natural Sciences	Applied Mathematics	Hsieh Wen Shen	Colorado State University	Flood control projects and sediment transport problems in Taiwan		
Natural Sciences	Applied Mathematics	Victor Twersky	University of Illinois, Chicago		Also won in 1979	
Natural Sciences	Applied Mathematics	Charles W. Van Atta	University of California, San Diego	Statistical structure of fluid turbulence		
Natural Sciences	Astronomy and Astrophysics	Friedrich H. Busse	University of California, Los Angeles	Theoretical studies in fluid dynamics		
Natural Sciences	Astronomy and Astrophysics	William E. Gordon	Rice University			
Natural Sciences	Astronomy and Astrophysics	James B. Kaler	University of Illinois			
Natural Sciences	Astronomy and Astrophysics	Charles W. Misner	University of Maryland	Development of theories of the initial conditions of the universe and of the nature of active galactic nuclei as possible sources of gravitational radiation		
Natural Sciences	Chemistry	R. Stephen Berry	University of Chicago			
Natural Sciences	Chemistry	Richard Bersohn	Columbia University	Research at University of Tel Aviv		
Natural Sciences	Chemistry	Bryce L. Crawford	University of Minnesota	Molecular motion in liquids and methods of characterizing materials	Also won in 1950	
Natural Sciences	Chemistry	John W. Faller	Yale University	Transition metal organometallic chemistry		
Natural Sciences	Chemistry	Karl F. Freed	University of Chicago	Research at Cavendish Laboratory and Laboratoire de Physique des Solides		
Natural Sciences	Chemistry	Harry B. Gray	California Institute of Technology			
Natural Sciences	Chemistry	Charles S. Johnson Jr.	University of North Carolina, Chapel Hill	Theory and technique of laser light scattering		
Natural Sciences	Chemistry	Jiri Jonas	University of Illinois, Urbana-Champaign	Research at the Max Planck Institute for Medical Research		
Natural Sciences	Chemistry	John F. W. Keana	University of Wisconsin, Madison			
Natural Sciences	Chemistry	Joseph B. Lambert	Northwestern University	Research at the British Museum		
Natural Sciences	Chemistry	Donald S. McClure	Princeton University			
Natural Sciences	Chemistry	B. Vincent McKoy	California Institute of Technology	Theoretical chemistry		
Natural Sciences	Chemistry	George A. Olah	Western Reserve University		Also won in 1988	
Natural Sciences	Chemistry	John M. Prausnitz	University of California, Berkeley	Thermodynamic properties of chain molecules and polymers from the standpoint of engineering design	Also won in 1961	
Natural Sciences	Chemistry	John W. Root	University of California, Davis	Chemical dynamics		
Natural Sciences	Chemistry	Robert J. Silbey	Massachusetts Institute of Technology			
Natural Sciences	Chemistry	Jeffrey I. Steinfeld	Massachusetts Institute of Technology	Research at the University of California, Berkeley and the University of Leiden		
Natural Sciences	Chemistry	Mark Robert Willcott	University of Houston			
Natural Sciences	Chemistry	T. Ffrancon Williams	University of Tennessee	Radiation chemistry		
Natural Sciences	Chemistry	John Martin Wood	University of Illinois, Urbana-Champaign	Mechanism of action of metalloenzymes		
Natural Sciences	Computer Science	Herbert Freeman	New York University			
Natural Sciences	Computer Science	Donald Knuth	Stanford University	Research in France		
Natural Sciences	Computer Science	Alan V. Oppenheim	Massachusetts Institute of Technology			
Natural Sciences	Earth Science	Robert A. Berner	Yale University	Phosphate adsorption, especially on iron oxides		
Natural Sciences	Earth Science	Jule Gregory Charney	Massachusetts Institute of Technology	Research at Cambridge University and the Weizmann Institute of Science		
Natural Sciences	Earth Science	Robert E. Garrison	University of California, Santa Cruz	Sedimentary petrology, specifically, the origin and lithification of chalks and limestones in Western Europe		
Natural Sciences	Earth Science	James Freeman Gilbert	Scripps Institution of Oceanography	Geophysical studies on earth structure	Also won in 1964	
Natural Sciences	Earth Science	Gerald Schubert	University of California, Los Angeles	Cellular control of ciliary motion		
Natural Sciences	Earth Science	Donald L. Turcotte	Cornell University	Evolution of continental mountain belts		
Natural Sciences	Earth Science	S. David Webb	University of Florida	Evolutionary studies on ruminants and quasi-ruminants		
Natural Sciences	Engineering	Richard E. Goodman	University of California, Berkeley	Methods of geological engineering		
Natural Sciences	Engineering	Michael A. Lieberman	University of California, Berkeley	Controlled thermonuclear fusion		
Natural Sciences	Mathematics	Solomon Feferman	Stanford University		Also won in 1986	
Natural Sciences	Mathematics	Herman R. Gluck	University of Pennsylvania	Riemannian geometry		
Natural Sciences	Mathematics	Daniel Gorenstein	Rutgers University			
Natural Sciences	Mathematics	Harry Kesten	Cornell University	Probability theory		
Natural Sciences	Mathematics	Elliott H. Lieb	Massachusetts Institute of Technology			
Natural Sciences	Mathematics	Henry P. McKean	New York University			
Natural Sciences	Mathematics	Rainer K. Sachs	University of California, Berkeley	General relativity		
Natural Sciences	Mathematics	Harold Widom	University of California, Santa Cruz	Orthogonal polynomials and related topics	Also won in 1967	
Natural Sciences	Medicine and Health	Edwin L. Bierman	University of Washington School of Medicine			
Natural Sciences	Medicine and Health	Roger William Birnbaum	Harvard Community Health Plan			
Natural Sciences	Medicine and Health	Morton Corn	University of Pittsburgh	Strategies and methods for sampling air pollutants		
Natural Sciences	Medicine and Health	Daniel Deykin	Harvard Medical School			
Natural Sciences	Medicine and Health	DeWitt S. Goodman	Columbia University College of Physicians & Surgeons			
Natural Sciences	Medicine and Health	Thomas C. Merigan	Stanford University School of Medicine			
Natural Sciences	Medicine and Health	Mervyn W. Susser	Columbia University			
Natural Sciences	Medicine and Health	Marshall R. Urist	University of California, Los Angeles	Construction of molecular models of bones		
Natural Sciences	Molecular and Cellular Biology	Gary Keith Ackers	University of Virginia School of Medicine	Physical chemistry of biological macromolecules		
Natural Sciences	Molecular and Cellular Biology	Merton R. Bernfield	Stanford University School of Medicine			
Natural Sciences	Molecular and Cellular Biology	Charles C. Brinton Jr.	University of Pittsburgh	Epiviral systems		
Natural Sciences	Molecular and Cellular Biology	Thomas Eisner	Cornell University	Chemical communication in insects	Also won in 1964	
Natural Sciences	Molecular and Cellular Biology	A. Dale Kaiser	Stanford University			
Natural Sciences	Molecular and Cellular Biology	Akira Kaji	University of Pennsylvania School of Medicine	Biochemical mechanism of cellular transformation		
Natural Sciences	Molecular and Cellular Biology	Neville R. Kallenbach	University of Pennsylvania	Nucleic acid conformations		
Natural Sciences	Molecular and Cellular Biology	Martin D. Kamen	University of California, San Diego	Biochemistry of redox systems in photosynthesis	Also won in 1956	
Natural Sciences	Molecular and Cellular Biology	Henry S. Kingdon	University of Chicago			
Natural Sciences	Molecular and Cellular Biology	Gene E. Likens	Cornell University	Biogeochemical cycles		
Natural Sciences	Molecular and Cellular Biology	William N. Lipscomb	Harvard University	Research at Cambridge University	Also won in 1954	
Natural Sciences	Molecular and Cellular Biology	Bruce A. McFadden	Washington State University	Structure and control of enzymes		
Natural Sciences	Molecular and Cellular Biology	Alan H. Mehler	Medical College of Wisconsin			
Natural Sciences	Molecular and Cellular Biology	R. Bruce Nicklas	Duke University	Cellular and developmental biology		
Natural Sciences	Molecular and Cellular Biology	Mark Ptashne	Harvard University			
Natural Sciences	Molecular and Cellular Biology	Brian R. Reid	University of California, Riverside	Chemistry of the enzymes that attach amino acids to transfer RNA molecules		
Natural Sciences	Molecular and Cellular Biology	Ruth Sager	Hunter College, CUNY	Research at Imperial Cancer Research Fund Laboratory		
Natural Sciences	Molecular and Cellular Biology	Peter Satir	University of California, Berkeley	Cellular control of ciliary motion		
Natural Sciences	Molecular and Cellular Biology	Dieter Söll	Yale University	Cell differentiation in insects	Also won in 1988	
Natural Sciences	Molecular and Cellular Biology	R. Walter Schlesinger	Rutgers Medical School	Virology		
Natural Sciences	Molecular and Cellular Biology	Serge N. Timasheff	Brandeis University			
Natural Sciences	Molecular and Cellular Biology	Jui Hsin Wang	Yale University	Bioenergetics	Also won in 1960	
Natural Sciences	Molecular and Cellular Biology	Allan Charles Wilson	University of California, Berkeley	Molecular evolution	Also won in 1979	
Natural Sciences	Neuroscience	Harold Leslie Atwood	University of Toronto			
Natural Sciences	Neuroscience	Frank R. Ervin	Harvard Medical School			
Natural Sciences	Neuroscience	Betty Twarog	Tufts University			
Natural Sciences	Organismic Biology and Ecology	Vincent G. Dethier	Princeton University		Also won in 1964	
Natural Sciences	Organismic Biology and Ecology	John S. Edwards	University of Washington	Embryo of the house cricket		
Natural Sciences	Organismic Biology and Ecology	Stephen T. Emlen	Cornell University	Colonial behavior in birds		
Natural Sciences	Organismic Biology and Ecology	Leon R. Kass	St. John's College			
Natural Sciences	Physics	Herbert B. Callen	University of Pennsylvania	Symmetry and conceptual basis of thermodynamics		
Natural Sciences	Physics	Hans Frauenfelder	University of Illinois, Urbana-Champaign		Also won in 1958	
Natural Sciences	Physics	William R. Frazer	University of California, San Diego	High-energy theoretical physics		
Natural Sciences	Physics	Gerson Goldhaber	University of California, Berkeley	High-energy physics		
Natural Sciences	Physics	Roy J. Glauber	Harvard University		Also won in 1957	
Natural Sciences	Physics	James J. Griffin	University of Maryland	Problems of the dynamics of nuclear fission		
Natural Sciences	Physics	Robert B. Griffiths	Carnegie-Mellon University	Theoretical studies in physical chemistry		
Natural Sciences	Physics	A. Brooks Harris	University of Pennsylvania	Solid-state physics		
Natural Sciences	Physics	Peter Heller	Brandeis University			
Natural Sciences	Physics	Robert Hofstadter	Stanford University	Elementary particle physics	Also won in 1958	
Natural Sciences	Physics	David L. Huber	University of Wisconsin, Madison			
Natural Sciences	Physics	Clyde A. Hutchison, Jr.	University of Chicago	Research at the University of Oxford	Also won in 1955	
Natural Sciences	Physics	Richard I. Joseph	Johns Hopkins University	Theory of magnetism		
Natural Sciences	Physics	David H. Miller	Purdue University	High-energy physics		
Natural Sciences	Physics	John D. Reppy	Cornell University	Two-dimensional superfluid systems	Also won in 1979	
Natural Sciences	Physics	Y. R. Shen	University of California, Berkeley	Solid-state physics and quantum electronics		
Natural Sciences	Physics	Rolf M. Steffen	Purdue University	Angular distributions of nuclear radiation		
Natural Sciences	Physics	Gerard J. Stephenson Jr.	University of Maryland	Use of intermediate energy reactions involving more than two particles, to better understand the interaction between nucleons		
Natural Sciences	Physics	T. Laurence Trueman	Brookhaven National Laboratory	Research at Oxford University		
Natural Sciences	Physics	Sidney Yip	Massachusetts Institute of Technology			
Natural Sciences	Physics	Herbert F. York	University of California, San Diego	Technology, politics, and strategy of the nuclear arms race		
Natural Sciences	Plant Science	Peter R. Day	Connecticut Agricultural Experiment Station	Genetics of cultured rust fungi		
Natural Sciences	Plant Science	David L. Dilcher	Indiana University	Paleobotany of southeastern North America	Also won in 1987	
Natural Sciences	Plant Science	Russell Lewis Jones	University of California, Berkeley	Molecular studies of plant growth hormones		
Natural Sciences	Plant Science	Hans Janos Kende	Michigan State University	Role of hormones in regulation of cell aging		
Natural Sciences	Plant Science	Ronald F. Scott	California Institute of Technology			
Natural Sciences	Plant Science	Joe L. White	Purdue University	Chemistry of soil clays and their interaction with organic pesticides		
Natural Sciences	Statistics	Rupert G. Miller Jr.	Stanford University	Research at Imperial College of Science and Technology and London School of Hygiene & Tropical Medicine		
Social Sciences	Anthropology and Cultural Studies	Harumi Befu	Stanford University			
Social Sciences	Anthropology and Cultural Studies	Kenelm O. L. Burridge	University of British Columbia	Effects of Christian missionary teaching in third-world countries		
Social Sciences	Anthropology and Cultural Studies	Brian M. Fagan	University of California, Santa Barbara	Written account of his findings based on extensive field work on Iron Age archaeology of Zambia and south central Africa		
Social Sciences	Anthropology and Cultural Studies	Oleg Grabar	Harvard University	Archaeological history of Qasr al-Hayr East in Syria		
Social Sciences	Anthropology and Cultural Studies	Robert F. Heizer	University of California, Berkeley	Technology and sociology of monumental stone transport in antiquity	Also won in 1963	
Social Sciences	Anthropology and Cultural Studies	Paul Kay	University of California, Berkeley	Creole languages		
Social Sciences	Anthropology and Cultural Studies	David William Plath	University of Illinois Urbana-Champaign			
Social Sciences	Anthropology and Cultural Studies	Orlando Villas-Bôas	Xingu Indigenous Park	Ethnographic studies on Brazilian Indian tribes		
Social Sciences	Economics	Kenneth J. Arrow	Harvard University			
Social Sciences	Economics	Arthur S. Goldberger	University of Wisconsin, Madison		Also won in 1984	
Social Sciences	Economics	Donald D. Hester	University of Wisconsin, Madison			
Social Sciences	Economics	Robert Lekachman	Stony Brook University			
Social Sciences	Economics	Jerome L. Stein	Brown University			
Social Sciences	Education	Allan M. Cartter	New York University	Analysis of highly-educated manpower in the United States		
Social Sciences	Education	Patricia Albjerg Graham	Barnard College			
Social Sciences	Education	Lee S. Shulman	Michigan State University	Organization of learning and processes of inquiry		
Social Sciences	Education	Elliot Turiel	Harvard University			
Social Sciences	Geography and Environmental Studies	James R. Gibson	York University			
Social Sciences	Law	Richard E. Ellis	University of Virginia	Development of American commercial law in the early 19th century		
Social Sciences	Law	Jeffrey O'Connell	University of Virginia School of Law		Also won in 1979	
Social Sciences	Political Science	J. Bowyer Bell	Harvard University			
Social Sciences	Political Science	Paul R. Brass	University of Washington			
Social Sciences	Political Science	Ted Robert Gurr	Northwestern University			
Social Sciences	Political Science	Louis Hartz	Harvard University			
Social Sciences	Political Science	Samuel P. Huntington	Harvard University			
Social Sciences	Political Science	Robert J. Lieber	University of California, Davis	Communication and conflict in European-American relations		
Social Sciences	Political Science	Michael Rogin	University of California, Berkeley	Andrew Jackson's life, Indian War, and Indian Removal Act		
Social Sciences	Political Science	Sheldon S. Wolin	University of California, Santa Cruz	Evolution of the idea of theory and of the theorist as political actor		
Social Sciences	Psychology	Albert Bandura	Stanford University	Aggressive behavior		
Social Sciences	Psychology	Robert C. Calfee	Stanford University			
Social Sciences	Psychology	Jerry A. Fodor	Massachusetts Institute of Technology			
Social Sciences	Psychology	Eleanor J. Gibson	Cornell University	Application of a theory of perceptual learning and development to the reading process		
Social Sciences	Psychology	Irving I. Gottesman	University of Minnesota	Human behavioral genetics		
Social Sciences	Psychology	Charles Hampden-Turner	Center for the Study of Public Policy (Cambridge, MA)			
Social Sciences	Psychology	William W. Lambert	Cornell University	Comparative analysis of aggressive actions in children		
Social Sciences	Psychology	Lewis P. Lipsitt	Brown University			
Social Sciences	Psychology	Stanley Milgram	CUNY Graduate Center	Mental maps		
Social Sciences	Psychology	Saul Sternberg	Bell Telephone Laboratories	Human information processing		
Social Sciences	Psychology	Harry C. Triandis	University of Illinois Urbana-Champaign			
Social Sciences	Psychology	Herbert Weiner	Albert Einstein College of Medicine			
Social Sciences	Sociology	Daniel Bell	Harvard University	The future		
Social Sciences	Sociology	Jack Porter Gibbs	University of Texas at Austin	Demographic studies on suicide theory		
Social Sciences	Sociology	Suzanne Keller	Princeton University			
Social Sciences	Sociology	Gerhard E. Lenski	University of North Carolina at Chapel Hill	Writing and research in the US, Sweden, Poland, and Yugoslavia		
Social Sciences	Sociology	Stanley Lieberson	University of Chicago			
Social Sciences	Sociology	S. M. Miller	New York University			
Social Sciences	Sociology	Philip Selznick	University of California, Berkeley	Sociology and the modern mind		

== 1972 Latin American and Caribbean Fellows ==
Category	Field of Study	Fellow	Institutional association	Research topic	Notes	Ref
Creative Arts	Drama and Performance Art	José Ricardo Morales Malva	University of Chile	Playwriting		
Creative Arts	Fiction	Héctor Alvarez Murena		Writing	Also won in 1967	
Creative Arts	Fiction	Juan García Ponce		Writing		
Creative Arts	Film	Fernando Krahn	Ercilla	Animated film		
Creative Arts	Fine Arts	Luis López Loza		Graphics		
Creative Arts	Fine Arts	César Paternosto		Painting		
Creative Arts	Music Composition	Jorge Arriagada	American Center for Art and Culture	Composing		
Creative Arts	Music Composition	Héctor Quintanar Prieto	Conservatorio Nacional de Música	Composing		
Creative Arts	Poetry	Nicanor Parra	University of Chile	Spanish anthology of contemporary North American poets		
Humanities	Fine Arts Research	Constantino Reyes-Valerio	Instituto Nacional de Antropología e Historia	Role of Indians in the artistic decoration of the 16th-century convents of New Spain		
Humanities	General Nonfiction	Wilson Harris		Modern novel		
Humanities	Iberian and Latin American History	Carlos Meléndez	University of Costa Rica	Kingdom of Guatemala in the 16th century		
Humanities	Linguistics	Manuel Alberto Escobar Sambrano	Universidad Nacional Mayor de San Marcos	Spanish dialects in Peru		
Humanities	Philosophy	Thomas Moro Simpson	Universidad de Buenos Aires	Logic and philosophic semantics		
Humanities	Spanish and Portuguese Literature	José Miguel Oviedo	Casa de la Cultura del Perú; Pontifical Catholic University of Peru	Critical study of César Vallejo		
Natural Sciences	Chemistry	Waldemar Adam	University of Puerto Rico	Chemistry of cyclic peroxides		
Natural Sciences	Earth Science	Lorenzo Francisco Aristarain	National University of La Plata	Geochemistry of borates		
Natural Sciences	Earth Science	José F. Bonaparte	National University of Tucumán	Vertebrate paleontology	Also won in 1966	
Natural Sciences	Mathematics	Fernando Cardoso	Federal University of Pernambuco	Linear partial differential equations		
Natural Sciences	Mathematics	Jacob Palis Jr.	Instituto de Matematica Pura e Aplicada	Theory of dynamical systems		
Natural Sciences	Medicine and Health	Carlos E. Sluzki	Center for Research in Psychiatry (Lanús)	Cross-cultural variations of patterns of child development		
Natural Sciences	Molecular and Cellular Biology	Luis A. Jiménez de Asúa	University of Buenos Aires	Biochemistry of cell transformation	Also won in 1980	
Natural Sciences	Plant Science	Jorge V. Crisci	National University of La Plata	Systematics of vascular plants		
Social Sciences	Geography and Environmental Studies	Michael G. A. Hill	Colombian Institute for Regional Planning	Geographical study of Colombia's Pacific mountain coast		
Social Sciences	Sociology	Silvia C. Sigal	Torcuato di Tella Institute	Comparative study of the evolution of the Latin American labor movement, 1950–1970		
Social Sciences	Sociology	César Alejandro Vapñarsky	Torcuato di Tella Institute	Urbanization process in Argentina, 1870–1970		

== See also ==
- Guggenheim Fellowship
- List of Guggenheim Fellowships awarded in 1971
- List of Guggenheim Fellowships awarded in 1973
