= Jiangnan =

Geographic area in China

Jiangnan 江南 Jiāngnán
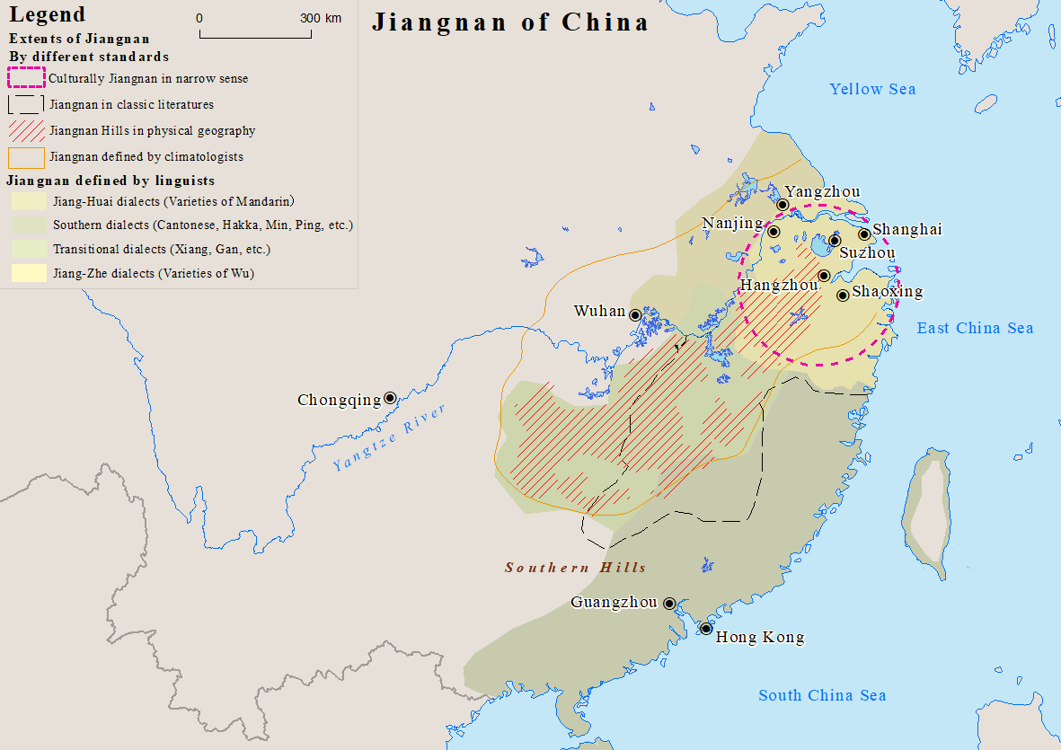
- Map showing different definitions of areas south of the lower Yangtze
- Country: China
- Regions: Shanghai; Parts of Anhui, Jiangxi, Jiangsu, Zhejiang

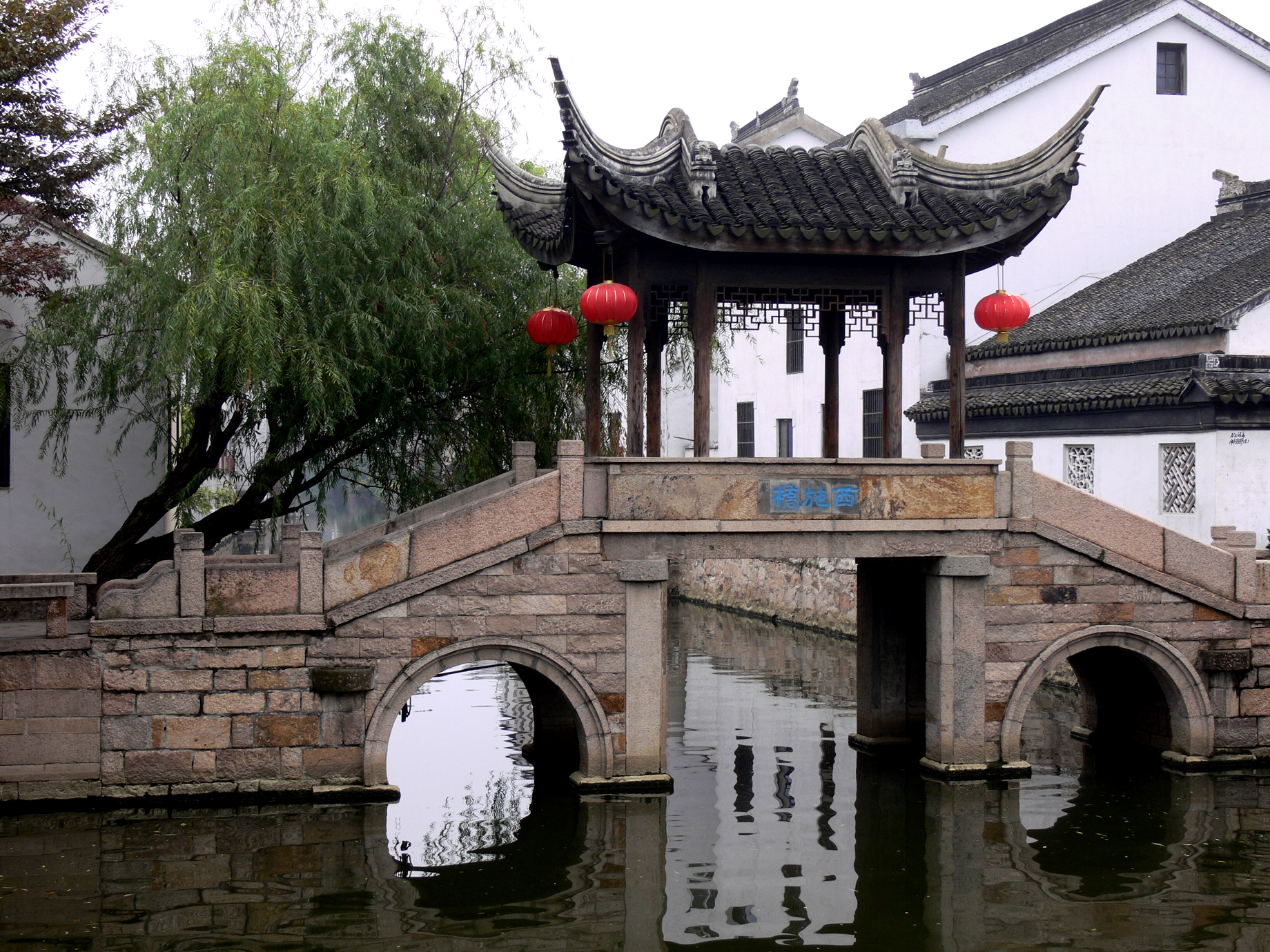
Xishi Bridge in Suzhou, Jiangsu

Jiangnan is a geographic area in East China referring to lands immediately to the south of the lower reaches of the Yangtze River, including the southern part of its delta. The region encompasses Shanghai, the southeast Jiangsu, the southeast Anhui, a tiny part of northeast Jiangxi, and Zhejiang Province. The most important cities in the area include Ningbo, Anqing, Changzhou, Hangzhou, Shaoxing, Suzhou, Wuxi, and Wenzhou.

Jiangnan has long been regarded as one of the most prosperous regions of China due to its wealth in trade and very high human development. Most people of the region speak a variety of Wu Chinese as their mother tongue.

== Etymology ==
The name Jiangnan is the pinyin romanization of the Standard Chinese pronunciation of 江南, meaning "[Lands] South of the [Yangtze] River". Although jiang (江) is now the common Chinese word for any large river, it was historically used in Ancient Chinese to refer specifically to the Yangtze River, which defines the Jiangnan region.

In older and non-standard romanization systems, Jiangnan was historically written as Chiang-nan, Kiangnan, and Keang-nan in English and other European languages.

== History ==
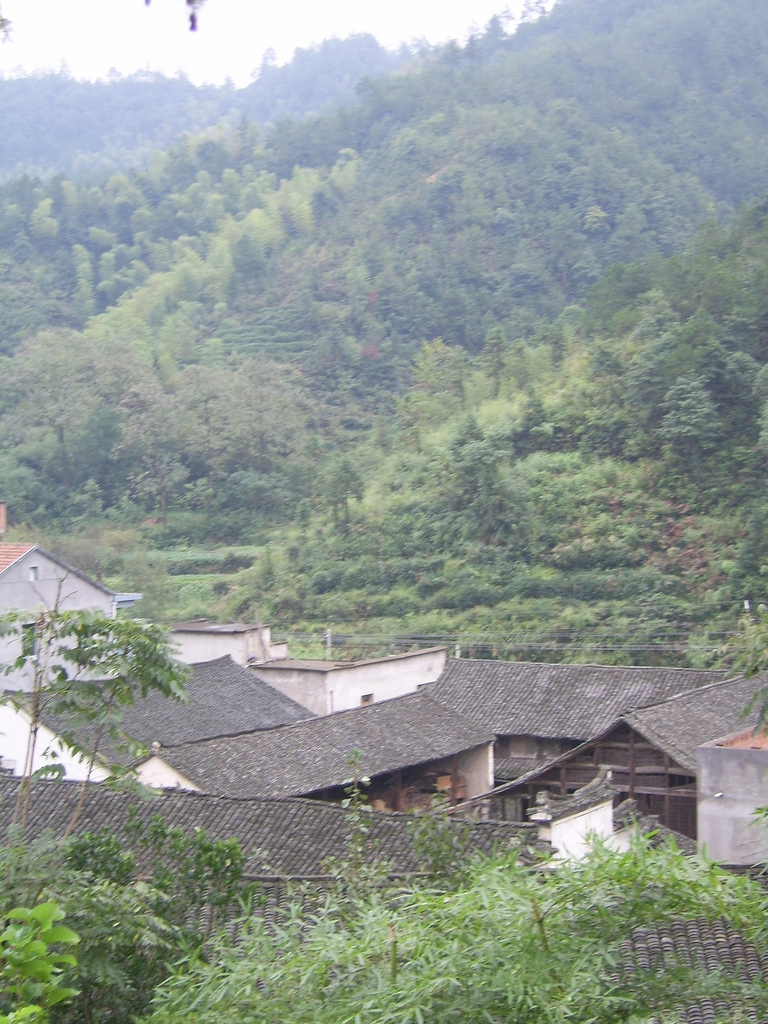
Village in Jiangnan

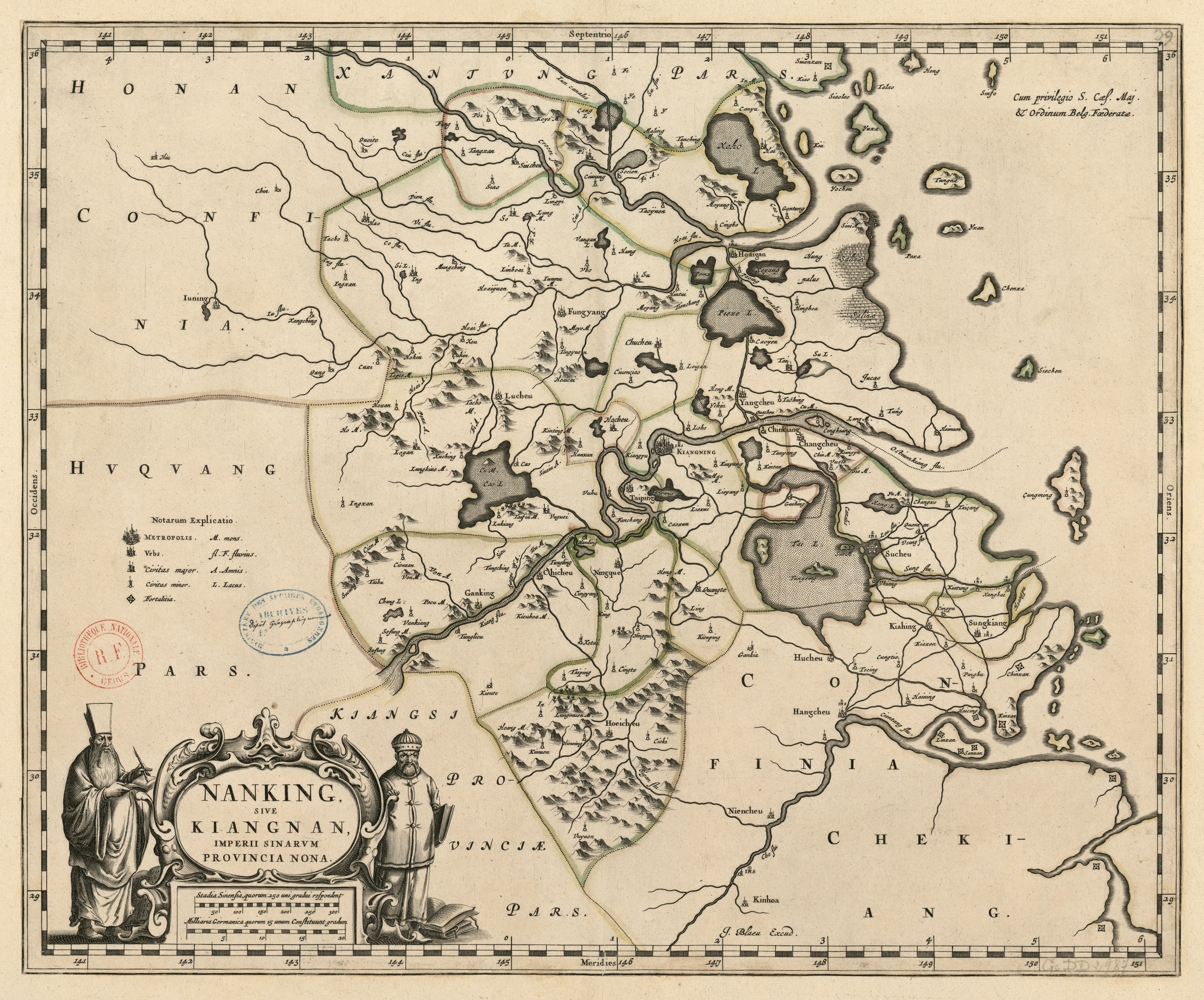
Nanking sive Kiangnan ("Nanjing or Jiangnan"), the 9th provincial map of the Chinese Empire in Martino Martini and Joan Blaeu's 1655 Novus Atlas Sinensis ("New Chinese Atlas").

The earliest evidences of archeology were of the Majiabang and of the Hemudu cultures. The later Liangzhu culture, from around 2600–2000 BC, created complex and beautiful jade artifacts. Their economy was based on rice cultivation, fishing and constructed houses on stilts over rivers or lakes. During the Zhou dynasty, numerous different ethnic groups like Wu, Baiyue and barbarian Subei Huaiyi peoples inhabited the area with heavy aquaculture and stilt houses, but became increasingly sinicized through contact with northern Chinese states. They adopted the Chinese writing system and created excellent bronze swords. The Chu state from the west (in Hubei) expanded into this area and defeated the Yue state. After Chu was conquered by the Qin state, China was unified. It was not until the fall of the Western Jin dynasty during the early 4th century AD that northerners, like the Subei, moved to Jiangnan in significant numbers, displacing the Wu people and mixing with other Subei in Jiangnan. The Yellow River valley was becoming barren due to flooding (lack of trees after intensive logging to create farmland) and constant warfare during the upheaval of the Five Barbarians.

Although Chinese civilization originated in the North China Plain around the Yellow River, natural climate change and continuous harassment from nomadic barbarians damaged North China's agricultural productivity throughout the 1st millennium AD. Many northern tribes settled in South China, where the Jiangnan area's warm and wet climate were ideal for supporting agriculture, and allowed for highly sophisticated cities to arise. As early as the Eastern Han dynasty (circa 2nd century AD), the Jiangnan area was one of the more economically prominent areas of China. Other than rice, Jiangnan produced highly profitable trade products such as tea, silk, and celadon porcelain (from Shangyu). Convenient transportation – the Grand Canal to the north, the Yangtze River to the west, and seaports such as Yangzhou – contributed greatly to local trade and also trade between ancient China and other nations.

Several Chinese dynasties were based in Jiangnan. After the Qin dynasty fell, the insurgent state of Chu took control. Its ruler, Xiang Yu, was born here. During the Three Kingdoms period, Jianye (present-day Nanjing) was the capital of Eastern Wu. In the 3rd century, many northern Chinese moved here after nomadic groups controlled the north. In the 10th century, Wuyue was a small coastal kingdom founded by Qian Liu who made a lasting cultural impact on Jiangnan and its people to this day. After the Northern Song dynasty ended at the 1126s, the Song dynasty government retreated south, establishing the new Southern Song capital at Hangzhou in 1127.

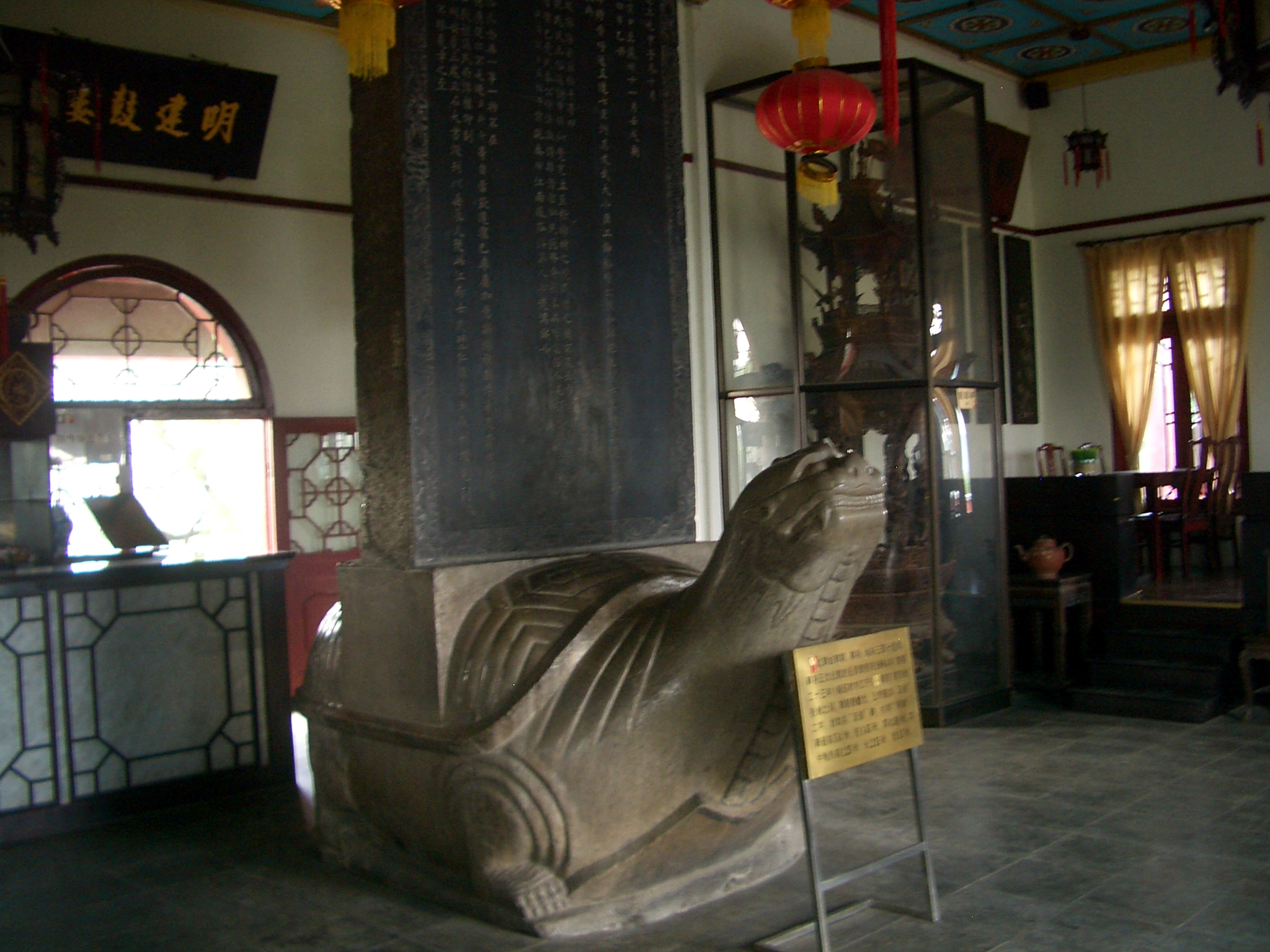
A stone tortoise with a tablet commemorating the Kangxi Emperor's visit to Nanjing in 1684

During the last years of the Yuan state, Jiangnan was fought over by two major rebel states: Zhu Yuanzhang's Ming faction, based in Nanjing, and the Suzhou-centered Wu faction led by Zhang Shicheng. A ten-year rivalry ended with Zhu's capture of Suzhou in 1367; having thus reunified Jiangnan, Zhu proclaimed himself the first emperor of the Ming dynasty on Chinese New Year's Day (20 January) of 1368, and a few months later expelled the Mongols from Northern China as well. Nanjing remained the capital of the Ming dynasty until the early 15th century, when the third Ming ruler, the Yongle Emperor, moved the capital to Beijing.

After the Ming empire, Jiangnan was divided into the separate provinces of Anhui and Jiangsu overseen by the Viceroy of Liangjiang. Besides assisting the Ming empire as long as possible, Jiangnan's gentry offered initial resistance before fleeing the Qing regime by interrupting tax collection in the area. Jiangnan, specifically Shaoxing, was actually the southern terminus of Kangxi's so-called Southern Inspection Tour.

The Taiping Heavenly Kingdom established by the Taiping rebels occupied much of Jiangnan and killed 60,000 Manchus in Nanjing. The area suffered much damage as the rebels killed Manchu children and adults.

During the Republic of China (ROC), following the wishes of Sun Yat-sen, Nanjing was made the national capital. From the late 1920s until the Second World War, the Jiangnan area was the focus of Chinese economic development. Much of the Kuomintang's ruling elite and the ROC's economic elite hailed from the Jiangnan area.

=== Geographical identity ===
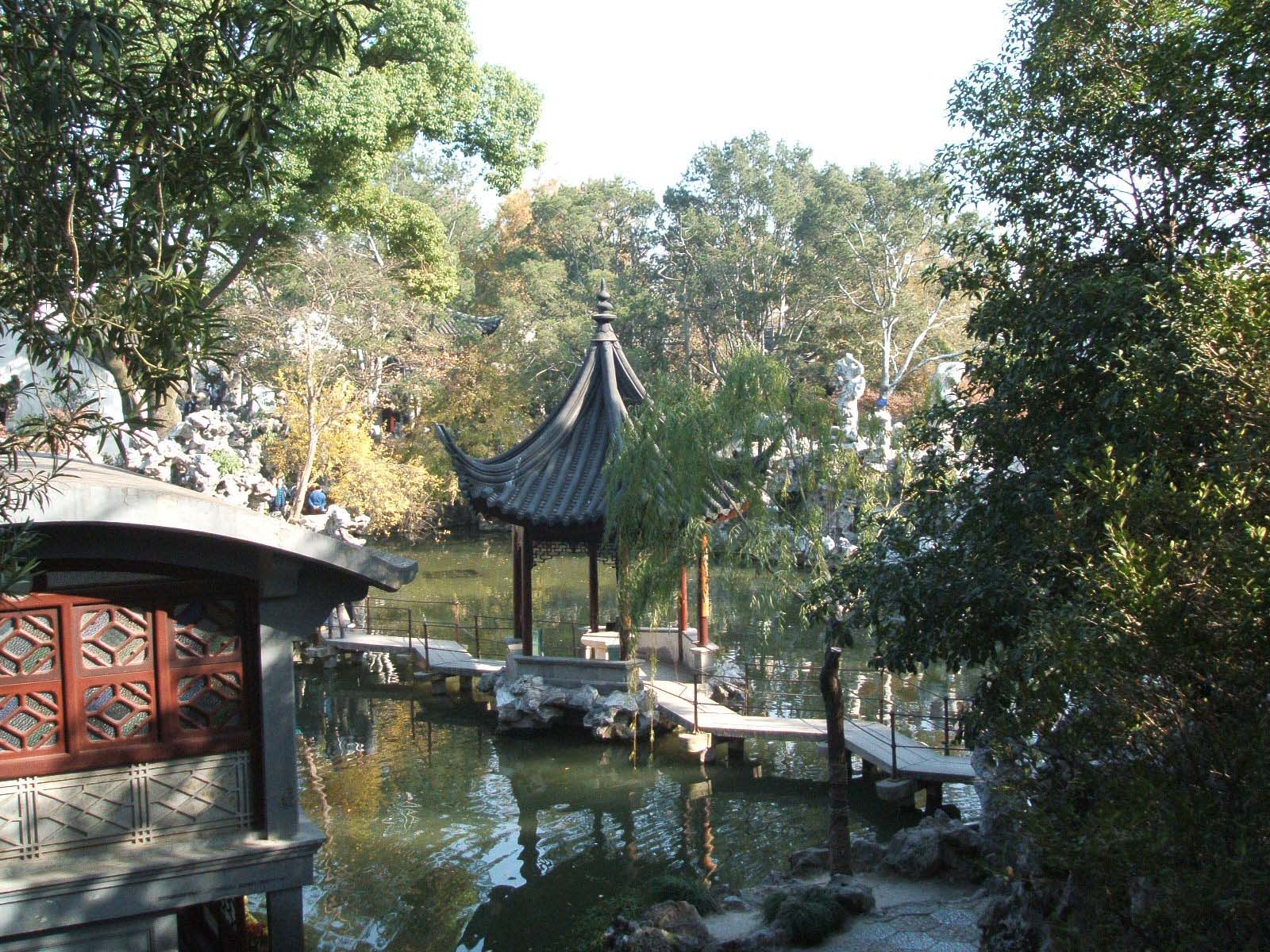
Shizi Lin

Dialect has also been used as a tool for regional identity and politics in the Jiangbei and Jiangnan regions. While there were large communities of foreigners in Yangzhou as it was a flourishing and prosperous centre of trade, it was sometimes considered part of Jiangnan (south of the river), as it was known to be wealthy, even though Yangzhou spoke Subei Jianghuai mandarin and was north of the Yangtze River. Once wealth and prosperity began to drop, it was then considered to be part of Jiangbei (literally "north of the river"), the "backwater". In the Jiangnan region south of the river itself, multiple subdialects of Wu fought for the position of the prestige dialect.

== Notable cities ==
- Hangzhou – historic capital of Song dynasty.
- Huzhou - famous city for silk and fish in Zhejiang province.
- Yiwu – commercial city
- Ningbo – a sub-provincial city in northeast Zhejiang province.
- Shanghai – one of the most important financial and economic centres.
- Suzhou – famous for its canals and beautiful architecture such as temples and gardens.
- Wenzhou – a prefecture in southeastern Zhejiang.

== Economy ==
Historically, Jiangnan exported silk and green tea.

== See also ==
- Wu (region)
- Eastern Wu
- Wuyue
- Apostolic Vicariate of Kiang-nan for the missionary history
- Henan
- Lingnan
- Physiographic macroregions of China
- Wuyue culture
