= Thomas R. Edwards =

American literary scholar and critic

Thomas R. Edwards (1928–2005) was an American literary scholar, critic, college professor, and author. His book Imagination and Power: A Study of Poetry on Public Themes was a finalist for the National Book Award in 1971. He was awarded a Guggenheim Fellowship in 1972 to write a book about Jane Austen.

== Life and career ==
Edwards graduated from Amherst College with a degree in English and earned a master's degree and PhD from Harvard University in 1956.

He was an English professor at Rutgers University in New Jersey from 1964 to 1993. Prior to that, He taught English at the University of California, Riverside, for eight years. He was awarded the Warren I. Susman Award at Rutgers, which is the highest honor given to professors at the university.

Aside from Imagination and Power, his other literary scholarly books include This Dark Estate: A Reading of Pope (1963), Over There: Criticizing America 1968-1989 (1991), and O'Brian's World (2005) (a companion to the Aubrey–Maturin series of sea novels by Patrick O'Brian).

He founded the literary journal Raritan Quarterly Review with Richard Poirier in 1981, with Edwards also serving as an editor for the journal. Edwards reviewed fiction books for The New York Review of Books and The New York Times Book Review.

== Imagination and Power ==
Imagination and Power studies how writers depicted those in power in their works across different eras, spanning The Renaissance to the present day, through the examination of archetypal poems and literary works from specific eras. Imagination and Power examines Christopher Marlowe's play Tamburlaine to explain that Marlowe (and others from the era) depicts Elizabethan era monarchs as being benelovent, charitable, and providing stability for their subjects.

In the 17th and 18th centuries, writers became more cynical and their works showed contempt and resistance towards those in power. Edwards explains how the novel's emergence during these centuries, with the medium's inclination towards realism, led to political leaders being depicted as ordinary men with flaws. These centuries also saw the emergence of satire in literature, which was well suited as fomenting resistance against those in power. Edwards examines an archetypal work from the era, Samuel Butler's satirical poem Hudibras, to illustrate how contemporary writers became more resistant and suspicious of those in power.

Regarding this more antagonistic approach, John Tytell states: "[I]nstead of wondering about the moral nature of power [in previous eras], poets concern themselves with participation in, or resistance to, power." Further works examined include the political satire poems Epilogue to the Satires by Alexander Pope and The Medall by John Dryden, which also rebuke the excesses and corruption of political power. Tytell calls the book "engaging and urbane".
