= Minnan region =

Region of Fujian province, China

Minnan (South Fujian) 闽南
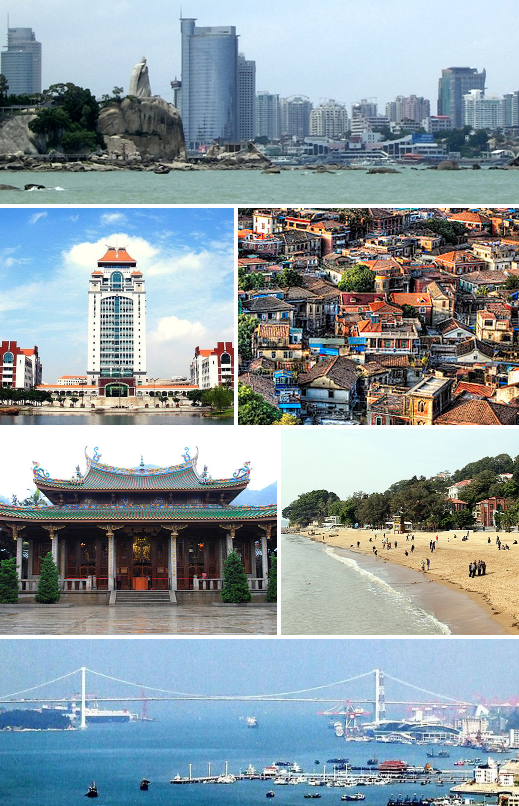
- From top: Xiamen's CBD, Xiamen University, colonial houses on Gulangyu Island, South Putuo Temple, beach on Gulangyu Island and Haicang Bridge
- Interactive map of Minnan (South Fujian)
- Coordinates: 25.0°N 118.0°E
- Country: China
- Province: Fujian
- Cities: List: Quanzhou; Zhangzhou; Xiamen; Xinluo and Zhangping

Area
  - Total: 25,806.3 km^{2} (9,963.9 sq mi)

Population (2010)
  - Total: 17,049,863 (approx.)
  - Density: 660.686/km^{2} (1,711.17/sq mi)
- Demonym(s): Minnan, Hokkien, Banlamese, Hoklo

Minnan, Banlam, or Minnan Golden Triangle (simplified Chinese: 闽南金三角; traditional Chinese: 閩南金三角; pinyin: Mǐnnán jīnsānjiǎo; Pe̍h-ōe-jī: Bân-lâm kim-saⁿ-kak; lit. 'South Fujian Golden Triangle'), refers to the coastal region in South Fujian Province, China, which includes the prefecture-level cities of Xiamen, Quanzhou and Zhangzhou. The region accounts for 40 percent of the GDP of Fujian Province. It is the native homeland of the Hokkien people who speak the Hokkien language or Minnan language, a variety of Southern Min.

Other terms used in the Minnan region include the one sinologist G. William Skinner used, which was the term Zhang-Quan (simplified Chinese: 漳泉分区; traditional Chinese: 漳泉分區; pinyin: Zhāng quán fēnqū; Pe̍h-ōe-jī: Chiuⁿ chôaⁿ pun-khu) to describe the region in his guide to the physiographic macroregions of China.
