= Susan Mann =

Susan Mann may refer to:

- Susan Mann (Canadian historian) (born 1941), President of York University
- Susan L. Mann (born 1943), American historian and sinologist
