= Liliane de Cock =

American photographer

- Born: 11 September 1939; Antwerp
- Died: 25 May 2013 (aged 73); Wiscasset
- Occupation: photographer

Liliane de Cock Morgan (September 11, 1939 — May 25, 2013) was a Belgian-born American photographer who won a Guggenheim Fellowship in 1972, and was assistant to Ansel Adams.

== Early life ==
Liliane de Cock was born near Antwerp, Belgium and spent much of her early childhood in an orphanage to be protected from bombs during World War II. She worked in factories as a teenager, including a factory that made photographic materials; she moved to America at age 21, in 1960. Once Morgan turned 21, she left on a boat to New York to start her new life in America. On the boat ride from Belgium to New York, she met a man named Brett Weston who was also travelling due to being part of the Guggenheim Fellowship. She lived in New York for approximately less than one year before moving to California. She formed an interest in photography while in New York.

== Career ==
Liliane De Cock was photographic assistant to Ansel Adams from 1963 to 1972, especially on Fiat Lux, a book of photographs marking the centennial of the University of California.

After moving to California, she was introduced to Ansel Adams by Weston whom she had met on her journey to New York. She started working for Adams as a part-time assistant for developing prints, but it soon turned into a full-time position where she ended up accomplishing many more skills from 1963 to 1972. She prepared Adams' prints, taught in workshops, and even traveled with Adams to help with taking pictures. During these years, she honed her photography skills through this apprenticeship-like experience with Adams. Every year, Adams would give her up to 6 weeks of vacation time. During these breaks, she traveled the United States taking photographs of her experiences.

In 1972, she became a Guggenheim Fellow and began showing her own work in New York. Adams wrote the introduction to her first book of photographs in 1973. Her photographs were also exhibited at the George Eastman House, the Massachusetts Institute of Technology, and the Amon Carter Museum of American Art in the 1970s.

After her marriage, she edited photography books for publication, judged photography competitions, and was a photographic printer. Her last solo exhibition was in Belgium in 1991. She was recognized as one of "the most important female photographers alive" in 1996.

== Personal life ==
Liliane de Cock married publisher Douglas O. Morgan, in 1972, at a ceremony performed in Ansel Adams' home in Carmel, California. She left her work with Adams shortly after and moved to New York with her husband to complete the fellowship along with assisting in the Morgan family publishing business. They had one son, Willard, and divorced in 1993.

Her mother-in-law was dance photographer Barbara Morgan.

She retired in 2010, and died from cancer in 2013, at Wiscasset, Maine, age 73. Works by Liliane de Cock are held in the collections of the Norton Simon Museum, Pasadena Museum of California Art, Dallas Museum of Art, the Pérez Art Museum Miami, and the Amon Carter Museum of American Art.
