= No Place of Grace =

History book by Jackson Lears

- First edition
- Author: Jackson Lears
- Subject: American history
- Published: 1981 (Pantheon Books)
- Pages: 375
- ISBN: 9780226469706

No Place of Grace: Antimodernism and the Transformation of American Culture, 1880–1920 is a history book written by Jackson Lears about American antimodernism at the turn of the 20th century.
