= T. J. Jackson Lears =

American historian (born 1947)

T. J. Jackson Lears (born 1947) is an American cultural and intellectual historian with interests in comparative religious history, literature and the visual arts, folklore and folk beliefs. He has taught at Rutgers University since 1986 and currently serves as the Board of Governors Distinguished Professor of History.

"It may seem unlikely that there is still something original to say about deep America; so many brilliant minds, starting with Tocqueville, have been at work deciphering the paradoxes of our all too mythic, all too preponderant country. But if anyone can, it is likely to be the author of Something for Nothing. No one is thinking with more spiritedness and subtlety about the roots (and ethical tangle) of American culture and the distinctive American pursuit of happiness than Jackson Lears," Susan Sontag wrote in 2003.

== Life ==
Lears grew up in Annapolis, Maryland. During the Vietnam War, Lears worked with the Navy as a cryptographer. After he left the Navy, he taught at a school for girls in the Virginia juvenile court system. Lears was educated at the University of Virginia, the University of North Carolina, and Yale University, where he received a Ph.D. in American Studies.

He has held fellowships from the Guggenheim Foundation, the Rockefeller Foundation, the American Council of Learned Societies, the National Endowment for the Humanities, the Winterthur Museum, the Smithsonian Institution, and the Shelby Cullom Davis Center at Princeton University. In October 2003 he received the Public Humanities Award from the New Jersey Council for the Humanities, and in 2009 he was elected a Fellow of the American Academy of Arts and Sciences.

Lears is the editor-in-chief of the Raritan Quarterly Review. He has been a regular contributor to The New Republic, The Nation, The Los Angeles Times, The Washington Post, The New York Times, and other publications. He has also written essays and reviews in The New York Times, The Nation, The New York Review of Books, the London Review of Books, The New Republic, and other magazines. He has taught at Yale University, the University of Missouri, and New York University.

== Books ==
- No Place of Grace: Antimodernism and the Transformation of American Culture, 1880–1920 (1981).
- Fables of Abundance: A Cultural History of Advertising in America (1994).
- Something for Nothing: Luck in America (2003).
- Rebirth of a Nation: The Making of Modern America, 1877–1920 (2009).
- Animal Spirits: the American Pursuit of Vitality from Camp Meeting to Wall Street (2023)

== Articles ==
- Jackson Lears, "Imperial Exceptionalism" (review of Victor Bulmer-Thomas, Empire in Retreat: The Past, Present, and Future of the United States, Yale University Press, 2018, ISBN 978-0-300-21000-2, 459 pp.; and David C. Hendrickson, Republic in Peril: American Empire and the Liberal Tradition, Oxford University Press, 2017, ISBN 978-0190660383, 287 pp.), The New York Review of Books, vol. LXVI, no. 2 (February 7, 2019), pp. 8–10.
- Jackson Lears, "The Forgotten Crime of War Itself" (review of Samuel Moyn, Humane: How the United States Abandoned Peace and Reinvented War, Farrar, Straus and Giroux, 2021, 400 pp.), The New York Review of Books, vol. LXIX, no. 7 (April 21, 2022), pp. 40–42. "After September 11 [2001] no politician asked whether the proper response to a terrorist attack should be a US war or an international police action. [...] Debating torture or other abuses, while indisputably valuable, has diverted Americans from 'deliberating on the deeper choice they were making to ignore constraints on starting war in the first place.' [W]ar itself causes far more suffering than violations of its rules." (p. 40.)
