= Susan L. Mann =

American historian

- Born: Susan Louise Mann; 1943 (age 82–83); United States
- Education: University of Michigan (BA; Stanford University (MA, PhD)
- Spouse: G. William Skinner
- Writing career
- Language: English
- Subject: History of China
- Notable awards: Joseph Levenson Book Prize; John K. Fairbank Prize

Susan Louise Mann (born 1943) is an American sinologist and historian of China best known for her work on the Qing dynasty and the role of women and gender in Chinese history. She was a professor of history at the University of California, Davis, from 1989 until her retirement in 2010.

Her 1997 book Precious Records: Women in China's Long Eighteenth Century won the Joseph Levenson Book Prize in the field of pre-20th century China and the American Historical Association awarded the Fairbank Prize for the best book in East Asian history to The Talented Women of the Zhang Family (2007). In making their award, the Historical Association said both books were "path-breaking interventions", praising the former for recognizing the important influence of elite Chinese women and the latter for exploring the significance of same-sex social environments for both genders in elite Chinese society, and added that both "brilliantly demonstrated how placing women and gender at the center of the inquiry changes our overall view of Chinese history."

She was president of the Association for Asian Studies (2000) and has been a member of the American Academy of Arts and Sciences since 2013.

== Education and career ==
Mann graduated with a bachelor's degree in Far Eastern languages and literatures from the University of Michigan, then earned her master's degree in Asian languages at Stanford University and then her doctorate there in 1972. Her doctoral dissertation concerned the eighteenth century scholar, Hong Liangji.

She taught briefly at Northwestern University and the University of Chicago in the mid-1970s, and at the University of California, Santa Cruz before joining the University of California, Davis, in 1989. At Davis she served as chair of the Department of East Asian Languages and Cultures and the Department of History. She received the Outstanding Mentor Award from the UC Davis Consortium for Women and Research.

She was married to the anthropologist G. William Skinner until his death in 2008.

== Scholarship on gender and women ==
Mann's first works focused on the relation between the Chinese merchant class and local officials, but while at the University of Chicago, The Women's Union asked Mann to be their sponsor. The students discussed feminist theory, which led Mann to ask new questions. She then turned her attention to women and gender relations in Chinese history.

Mann joined feminist scholars in the 1980s and 1990s, including Patricia Ebrey, Charlotte Furth, Dorothy Ko, Evelyn Rawski, Paul Ropp, Ann Waltner, and Ellen Widmer, who turned their attention to the roles of women in the late Ming dynasty and early and mid Manchu Qing dynasty, the 16th through early 19th centuries. This period was relatively unstudied in spite of being the most richly documented period of Chinese history before Western influences became powerful in the 19th century. Economic growth and urbanization brought social mobility, while an expansion of printing and literacy gave voice to women. These recent scholars used texts written by women and for women in addition to texts written by men for or about women. They found that the anti-traditional biases of modern Chinese intellectuals against Confucianism and the traditional family had too often confirmed the same sorts of bias among Western scholars. The new work moved to correct misunderstandings about Confucian traditional society and the assumption that women were passive victims who helped to perpetuate their own victimhood because they were ignorant and powerless.

Precious Records: Women in China's Long Eighteenth Century (1997), won the Joseph Levenson Prize from the Association for Asian Studies, and The Talented Women of the Zhang Family (2007), was a group biography of women in several generations of a literati family in the lower Yangzi region. The first, Precious Records, showed that upper-class women, although kept in the "inner quarters" and not allowed to participate in political life outside the home, were not mere victims of Confucian patriarchy. Mann used both the writings of the literati in their families, who wrote often appreciative accounts, and their own writings, mainly poetry.

Mann's second prize-winning book, The Talented Women of the Zhang Family, explores many of the same themes but through portraits of three women, a mother, her daughter, and a great-niece, over a period from the 1790s to the 1860s, going from the height of Qing prosperity and peace to the chaos of the Taiping Rebellion.Mann not only translates the poetry of the women, but allows herself to recreate their feelings and invent some scenes that reveal their character.

Gender and Sexuality in Modern China reprinted a range of her essays. Margaret Kuo, writing in China Review International praised her insights on gender and sexuality in modern China and described her as a leading authority on the subject. The essays use approaches from history, literature, philosophy, religion, and other disciplines, but build into an argument that has larger dimensions. Mann shows that the Chinese state played a generous role in regulating gender and sexuality, categories which in turn give historians materials that they can use in innovative ways. Kuo singled out her "masterful treatment" of the rise and fall of dynasties for "illustrating how adopting sexuality as an analytic category enables the historian to tackle areas in which actual women may not have been present but gendered power formations and sexualized ways of understanding the world certainly were." Mann argues that the Chinese state was distinctive for the outsized role it played in regulating gender and sexuality, a role in which "the family, gendered division of labor, and processes of reproduction were more closely tied together with the operation of the state than perhaps in any other political system."

== Selected publications ==
- Jones, Susan Mann (1972). Hung Liang-Chi (1746–1809): The Perception and Articulation of Political Problems in Late Eighteenth Century China (PhD thesis). Stanford University.
- Mann, Susan; Kuhn, Philip (1978). "Dynastic Decline and the Roots of Rebelion". In Fairbank, John King (ed.). Cambridge History of China. Vol. 10. Cambridge; New York: Cambridge University Press. pp. 107–162.
- Mann, Susan (1986). "New Perspectives on Chinese Urbanization". Journal of Urban History. 13 (1): 72–81. doi:10.1177/009614428601300104. S2CID 144973491.
- Mann, Susan (1987). Local Merchants and the Chinese Bureaucracy : 1750–1950. Stanford (Calif.): Stanford University Press. ISBN 978-0-8047-1341-2.
- Mann, Susan (1992). "" Fuxue"(Women's Learning) by Zhang Xuecheng (1738–1801): China's First History of Women's Culture". Late Imperial China. 13 (1): 40–62. doi:10.1353/late.1992.0004. S2CID 144166028.
- Mann, Susan (1996). "Women in the Life and Thought of Zhang Xuecheng". Chinese Language, Thought, and Culture: Nivison and His Critics: 98–105.
- Mann, Susan (1997). Precious Records: Women in China's Long Eighteenth Century. Stanford, Calif.: Stanford University Press. ISBN 978-0-8047-2743-3.
- Mann, Susan (2000). "The Male Bond in Chinese History and Culture". American Historical Review. 105 (5): 1600–1614. doi:10.2307/2652032. JSTOR 2652032.
- Mann, Susan (2000). "Presidential Address: Myths of Asian Womanhood". The Journal of Asian Studies. 59 (4): 835–862. doi:10.2307/2659214. JSTOR 2659214. S2CID 161399752.
- Mann, Susan; Cheng, Yu-Yin (2001). Under Confucian Eyes : Writings on Gender in Chinese History. Berkeley: University of California Press. ISBN 978-0-520-22274-8.
- Mann, Susan (2007). The Talented Women of the Zhang Family. Berkeley: University of California Press. ISBN 978-0-520-25089-5.
- Mann, Susan (2008). "Dowry Wealth and Wifely Virtue in Mid-Qing Gentry Households". Late Imperial China. 29 (1S): 64–76. doi:10.1353/late.0.0006. S2CID 154221741.
- Mann, Susan L. (2009). "Scene-Setting: Writing Biography in Chinese History". The American Historical Review. 114 (3): 631–639. doi:10.1086/ahr.114.3.631.
- Mann, Susan (2011). Gender and Sexuality in Modern Chinese History. New York: Cambridge University Press. ISBN 978-0-521-86514-2.
