= Regional religious system =

The concept of the regional religious system (RRS) 區域宗教系統 was first put forth in an article co-authored by Jiang Wu 吳疆, Daoqin Tong 童道琴, and Karl Ryavec (2013) based on spatial analysis and GIS modeling of the distribution of religious sites in Greater China. This study has been inspired by regional systems analysis (RSA) and the study of hierarchical regional space (HRC) and macroregions 宏區域 developed by G. William Skinner 施堅雅.

== Definition of RRS ==
A preliminary definition is provided in the article by Wu, Tong and Ryavec:

A regional religious system is a type of spatial formation in which a group of related or unrelated religious institutions are conditioned by physical, geographical, administrative, cultural, or socioeconomic systems and are highly dependent on regionally and locally distributed variables such as economy, transportation, education, culture, ethnicity, and language, etc.

According to their study, an RRS is basically a spatial formation characterized by the geographical distribution of religious sites. The formation of an RRS is shaped by regional systems such as William Skinner's macroregions. Also, the distribution of these sites relies on regionally and locally distributed factors.

== GIS modeling of RRS: methodology and sources ==
GIS modeling of RRS focuses on the distribution of Buddhist sites in Chinese history, because of the persistent presence of Buddhism in Chinese culture and history. This study is based on the assumption that "Chinese Buddhist institutions are fundamentally local institutions and temple-building activities are spontaneous endeavors initiated at the local level by harnessing local resources."

The research team first studied the distribution of religious sites by implementing the kernel density estimation in ArcGIS. A series of density maps were generated based on three major datasets ranging from Buddhist institutions in Han Chinese areas (including Taiwan) from the Tang and Five Dynasties period, the Qing dynasty period, and the contemporary period. Second, the research team conducted similar analysis in non-Han Chinese areas such as the Tibetan Plateau and Mosques in Muslim areas. Third, these mapping results are compared with macroregion maps Skinner created.

== Findings ==
High levels of correlation are found between these density maps and Skinner's macroregions. First, clusterings of Buddhist sites are found in most of Skinner's macroregions. Second, density maps create natural boundaries overlapping with those of Skinner's macroregions. Third, the distribution of transportation routes greatly impacted the distribution of Buddhist sites. Finally, the distribution pattern clearly shows a core-periphery relationship. Based on these initial findings, the Greater China area has been delineated into ten RRSs.

== Sources ==
- Jiang Wu, Daoqin Tong. Spatial Analysis and GIS Modeling of Regional Religious Systems in China. University of Arizona.
- Daoqin Tong, Karl Ryavec. Spatial Analysis and GIS Modeling of Regional Religious Systems in China: Conceptualization and Initial Experiments. Chinese History in Geographical Perspective, ed. By Jeff Kyong-McClain and Yongtao Du. Lexington Books, 2013, pp. 179–196.
