= Physiographic macroregions of China =

Physiographic macroregions of China is a term suggested by an American anthropologist G. William Skinner as a subdivision of China Proper into nine areas according to the drainage basins of the major rivers and other travel-constraining geomorphological features. They are distinct in terms of environment, economic resources, culture and more or less interdependent histories with often unsynchronized developmental macrocycles. They were described in Skinner's landmark essays in The City in Late Imperial China.

== 19th century ==
Skinner and his school maintain that prior to modernization, transportation was largely constrained by terrain and the physiographic macroregions are a close approximation for the socioeconomic macroregions of 19th-century China. The macroregions are defined by Skinner as follows:

- 10 Northeast China, 东北区
- 20 North China, 华北区
- 30 Northwest China 西北区
  - Wei-Fen Basins 渭汾流域分区
  - Upper Yellow River Basin 黄河上游分区
  - Gansu Corridor 河西(甘肃)走廊分区
- 40 Upper Yangtze 长江上游区
- 50 Middle Yangtze 长江中游区
  - Middle Yangtze proper 长江中游分区
  - Gan Basin 赣江流域分区
  - Yuan Basin 沅江流域分区
  - Upper Han Basin 汉江上游分区
- 60 Lower Yangtze 长江下游区
- 70 Southeast Coast 东南沿海区 (approximately Fujian, eastern part of Guangdong, southern part of Zhejiang, and Taiwan)
  - Ou-Ling River Basins 瓯灵流域分区
  - Min River Basin 闽江流域分区
  - Zhang-Quan 漳泉分区 (Zhangzhou plus Quanzhou)
  - Han Basin 韩江流域分区
  - Taiwan 台湾分区
- 80 Lingnan 岭南区, which may be translated as "South of Mountains". It includes the Southern coast and nearly coincides with the two entities: province of Guangdong and Guangxi autonomous region, together traditionally called "Two Guang provinces", or Liangguang.
- 90 Yungui 云贵区; covers most of Yunnan Province and larger part of Guizhou Province and corresponds to the Yungui Plateau.

Modern provinces of Xinjiang, Tibet, Qinghai and a larger part of Inner Mongolia are not considered by Skinner's scheme.

== 20th century ==
According to Skinner's analysis, the 20th century China excluding Inner Asia has 9 socioeconomic macroregions with cores not changed from the physiographic ones of the 19th century, but with changed territorial extents.

== See also ==
- Regions of China
- Administrative divisions of China
- Geography of China#History
- Regional Religious System - an approach to the study of Chinese religion based on Skinner's research
