= Raritan (journal) =

- Discipline: Literary journal
- Language: English
- Edited by: Jackson Lears

Publication details
- History: 1981–2025
- Publisher: Rutgers University (United States)
- Frequency: Quarterly

Standard abbreviations
- ISO 4: Raritan

Indexing
- ISSN: 0275-1607

Links
- Journal homepage

Raritan was a literary and intellectual quarterly that published poetry, fiction and essays. The journal was based at Rutgers University in New Jersey. The magazine was founded by Richard Poirier and Thomas R. Edwards in 1981 and was edited by Jackson Lears from 2002 until the publication's close. In a note accompanying the Winter 2025 issue, Lears announced that the journal "will cease publication after the Late Spring 2025 issue, the last under [his] editorship."

Notable writers who have contributed to this journal include Jacob M. Appel, Harold Bloom, David Bromwich, Anne Carson, Robert Coles, William C. Dowling, David Ferry, Harry Frankfurt, George Kateb, Frank Kermode, Joyce Carol Oates, Adam Phillips, Robert Pinsky, Richard Posner, Richard Rorty, Edward Said, Frederick Seidel, Vikram Seth, Daniel Stern, and Michael Wood.

== See also ==
- List of literary magazines
