= Charlotte Furth =

American historian (1934–2022)

- Charlotte Furth, from a 1972 newspaper
- Born: January 22, 1934; Charlottesville, Virginia, U.S.
- Died: June 19, 2022 (aged 88); Los Angeles, California, U.S.
- Occupations: College professor, Asian studies scholar
- Notable work: A Flourishing Yin: Gender in China’s Medical History 960-1665 (1999)

Charlotte Davis Furth (January 22, 1934 – June 19, 2022) was an American scholar of Chinese history. She was a professor at California State University, Long Beach, and at the University of Southern California. She was awarded a Guggenheim Fellowship and a Fulbright fellowship for her research, and published several books.

== Early life and education ==
Charlotte Davis was born in Charlottesville, Virginia, and raised in Chapel Hill, North Carolina, the daughter of Lambert Davis and Isabella Davis. She earned a bachelor's degree in French literature from the University of North Carolina in 1954. She completed doctoral studies in Chinese history at Stanford University in 1965, the same year her younger child was born.

== Career ==
Furth taught history for 23 years at the California State University, Long Beach (CSULB), until 1989, and then for 18 more years at the University of Southern California (USC). In 1972 she was awarded a Guggenheim Fellowship. She taught at Beijing University in 1981 and 1982, one of the first American Fulbright fellows admitted to teach in China after the Cultural Revolution. She was awarded the 2001 Margaret W. Rossiter History of Women in Science Prize for her book A Flourishing Yin: Gender in China’s Medical History, 960-1665 (1999). She retired with emeritus status from USC in 2008. In 2012 she was honored by the Association for Asian Studies with an award for her "distinguished contributions to Asian Studies."

== Publications ==
Furth was co-editor of Late Imperial China, and served on the editorial board of The Journal of Asian Studies. She was a contributor to The Cambridge History of China.

- Ting Wen-Chiang: Science and China’s New Culture (1970)
- Reflections on the May Fourth Movement: A Symposium (1972, with Merle Goldman and Jerome B. Grieder)
- The Limits of Change: Essays on Conservative Alternatives in Republican China (1976, edited by Furth)
- Women in China: Bibliography of Available English Language Materials (1984, with Lucie Cheng and Hon-ming Yip)
- "Blood, Body, and Gender: Medical Images of the Female Condition in China 1600–1850" (1986)
- "Concepts of Pregnancy, Childbirth, and Infancy in Ch'ing Dynasty China" (1987)
- "Androgynous Males and Deficient Females: Biology and Gender Boundaries in Sixteenth- and Seventeenth-Century China" (1988)
- "Chinese Medicine and the Anthropology of Menstruation in Contemporary Taiwan" (1992, with Ch'en Shu-yueh)
- "Poetry and Women's Culture in Late Imperial China: Editor's Introduction" (1992)
- A Flourishing Yin: Gender in China’s Medical History 960-1665 (1999)
- "The Physician as Philosopher of the Way: Zhu Zhenheng (1282–1358)" (2006)
- Thinking with Cases: Specialist Knowledge in Chinese Cultural History (2007, with Judith T. Zeitlin and Ping-chen Hsiung)
- Health and Hygiene in Chinese East Asia: Policies and Publics in the Long Twentieth Century (2010, with Angela Ki Che Leung and Qizi Liang)
- Opening to China: A Memoir of Normalization, 1981–1982 (2017)

== Personal life ==
In 1956, Charlotte Davis married her childhood friend Montgomery Furth, a philosophy professor. They had two children, David and Isabella. Her husband died in 1991, and she died in 2022, at the age of 88.
