= Julius Tobias =

American painter and sculptor

Julius Tobias (1915 – 1999) was an American painter and sculptor, known for creating large minimalist environments. He was a student of Fernand Léger. Works by Tobias are in the collection of the Brooklyn Museum and the Albright-Knox Art Gallery
