= Michael George Cooke =

American academic (1934–1990)

Michael George Cooke (September 11, 1934 – September 11, 1990) was an American academic.

Cooke graduated from Yale University in 1957, and completed doctoral studies at the University of California, Berkeley in 1962. He then began teaching at Yale, accepting an assistant professorship at his alma mater in 1968. Cooke later taught at the University of Iowa and at Boston University, before returning to Yale in 1971. Cooke was later appointed by Yale as the Bird White Housum Professor of English Literature in 1987. Cooke was injured in a traffic collision in Woodbridge, Connecticut, on September 11, 1990, his 56th birthday. He died later that day at St. Raphael's Hospital in New Haven, Connecticut.
