= Richard Poirier =

American literary critic (1925–2009)

Richard Poirier (September 9, 1925 – August 15, 2009) was an American literary critic. He was known for his editorship of Raritan and Partisan Review and for co-founding the Library of America. He was a named chair professor of English Literature at Rutgers University.

== Early life and education ==
Poirier was born on September 9, 1925 in Gloucester, Massachusetts. After high school, he served in the US Army and served in the European theater of World War II.

He graduated from Amherst College on the G.I. Bill, earned an MA from Yale University, and then a PhD from Harvard University in 1960. He also studied under the literary critic F. R. Leavis at Downing College, Cambridge, on a Fulbright Scholarship during the 1950s.

== Career ==
He co-founded the Library of America in 1979 and served as chairman of its board. He was the Marius Bewley Professor of American and English Literature at Rutgers University. He was also the founder and editor of Raritan, a literary quarterly, and an editor of Partisan Review. He was series editor of Prize Stories: The O. Henry Awards from 1961 to 1966.

In 1968, he signed the "Writers and Editors War Tax Protest" pledge, vowing to refuse tax payments in protest against the Vietnam War.

== Death ==
Poirer died on August 15, 2009 in Manhattan.

== Works ==
- Stories British and American (1953) with Jack Barry Ludwig
- The Comic Sense of Henry James: A Study of the Early Novels (1960)
- In Defense of Reading : A Reader's Approach to Literary Criticism (1963) editor with Reuben A. Brower
- A World Elsewhere: The Place of Style in American Literature (1966)
- American Literature: Volume Two (Little, Brown 1970) editor with William L. Vance
- The Oxford Reader: Varieties of Contemporary Discourse (1971) editor with Frank Kermode
- The Performing Self: Compositions and Decompositions in the Languages of Contemporary Life (1971)
- Mailer (Fontana Modern Masters, 1972)
- Robert Frost: The Work of Knowing (1977)
- The Renewal Of Literature: Emersonian Reflections (Random House, 1987) ISBN 0-394-50140-3
- Raritan Reading (1990) editor
- Ralph Waldo Emerson (1990)
- Poetry and Pragmatism (1992)
- Collected Poems, Prose, and Plays of Robert Frost (Library of America, 1995) editor with Mark Richardson
- Trying It Out in America: Literary and Other Performances (2003)
