= G. William Skinner =

American anthropologist and scholar of China

George William Skinner
- Born: February 14, 1925; Oakland, California, U.S.
- Died: October 26, 2008 (aged 83); Davis, California, U.S.
- Education: Deep Springs College; Cornell University
- Known for: Physiographic macroregions of China, Model of the Chinese standard marketing area
- Spouse: Susan L. Mann
- Scientific career
- Fields: Anthropology of China; Anthropology of Southeast Asia (especially Overseas Chinese, Indonesia and Thailand); China Studies
- Workplaces: Cornell University; Columbia University; Stanford University; University of California, Davis
- Doctoral advisor: Lauriston Sharp
- Doctoral students: Norma Diamond, P. Steven Sangren, Stevan Harrell
- Other notable students: Katherine Verdery, Helen Siu, Steven Mosher

George William Skinner (simplified Chinese: 施坚雅; traditional Chinese: 施堅雅; February 14, 1925 – October 26, 2008) was an American anthropologist and scholar of China. Skinner was a proponent of the spatial approach to Chinese history, as explained in his Presidential Address to the Association for Asian Studies in 1984. He often referred to his approach as "regional analysis," and taught the use of maps as a key class of data in ethnography.

== Early life and education ==
Skinner was born on February 14, 1925, in Oakland, California. His father, John James Skinner, was a pharmacologist and his mother, Eunice Engle Skinner, taught music and became the director of music education for the Berkeley school system; his sister, Jane Skinner Hardester, became a noted choral conductor. Skinner spent two years at Deep Springs College, a small college founded in 1917 by electricity tycoon and philanthropist L. L. Nunn to educate small cohorts of young men into the life of the mind in a self-sufficient, disciplined manner. Julian Haynes Steward, an American anthropologist best known for his role in developing theories of cultural ecology, is an early graduate of this institution and undertook a career in anthropology.

After Deep Springs, he joined the Navy V-12 Program in 1943, then attended the U.S. Navy Oriental Language School for 18 months at the University of Colorado, Boulder, where he studied Chinese. The language school he attended was formerly named the Navy Japanese Language School, which, during wartime, staffed many Japanese American instructors that trained U.S. Navy and Marinal personnel for duty in the Pacific. In 1944, the school was renamed the U.S. Navy Oriental Language School to include courses in Chinese, Russian, and Malay. The contract between the Navy and the University of Colorado concluded on June 15, 1946. These shifts in the program's focus and operations account for Skinner's enrollment in the Chinese section.

In 1946, Skinner headed for Cornell University to complete his B.A. degree. This was a common path for Deep Springs students, due to the connection between the two institutions through L. L. Nunn, who also founded the Telluride House at Cornell in 1911. Skinner graduated in 1947 with his B.A. (with distinction) in the Department of Far Eastern Studies (changed to Asian Studies in 1962), which was initially organized in 1946 and institutionalized from a wartime program in the language, history, and culture of China that trained people for government service. According to the history of the department, it was a groundbreaking period when the foundational structure of administrative units focused on Asia, including area studies programs, were established. Skinner remained there for his Ph.D. in anthropology under the supervision of Lauriston Sharp.

During Skinner's early academic years at Cornell, the institution experienced significant disciplinary shifts. As mentioned in the previous paragraph, area studies have received greater attention. Specifically, Asian studies in Cornell's Anthropology Department can be traced back to at least around 1947, when the Cornell Thailand Project was initiated as part of the Cross-Cultural Methodology Project, with a focus on technological change and development. Lauriston Sharp led the work in Thailand, and shortly thereafter, Morris Opler began a study on disease transmission in India. The long-term nature of these projects allowed several students to start their work with one of the research centers, continue through their graduate studies, and, in some cases, join the faculty as experienced colleagues.

== Academic career ==
Skinner's first job was as instructor in sociology at Cornell in 1949. Late in that year he flew to Chengdu, in China's Sichuan province, to conduct doctoral dissertation research on the structure of markets in the Chengdu Plain. Skinner's research was cut short by the arrival of the People's Liberation Army, which confiscated his notes, but the experience became the basis of his later work on spatial modelling. A copy of his field notes on village life in and around Gaodianzi and pre-revolution Chengdu were later discovered and published in 2017 as Rural China on the Eve of Revolution: Sichuan Fieldnotes, 1949–1950. Additionally, due to the inaccessibility to China, Skinner turned his research focus to the diasporic Chinese communities in Southeast Asia.

Particularly, according to Lauriston Sharp, research and training seminars conducted by faculty and graduate students at Cornell "during 1949 and 1950 indicated positively the importance of the overseas Chinese in Southeast Asia for any realistic assessment on a regional basis of the economic and political situation in a major portion of the Far East" (a geographical term no longer used within the academia for its negative implications of Orientalism). This institutional and logistical change was a strategic and academic move of the Department of Anthropology. In the preface written for Skinner's report on the Chinese communities in Southeast Asia in 1950, Lauriston wrote, "There still remained the question, accordingly, of how much more could be accomplished effectively in the various political units of Southeast Asia through coordinated and systematic research efforts carried out openly by interested outsiders most of whom would normally have been trained to work in China proper."

It was to seek an answer to this question that the Department commissioned Skinner to conduct a survey of the Chinese in Southeast Asian when he emerged in Hong Kong in late August, 1950, after spending almost all of the previous twelve months in western China. Skinner then proceeded to Bangkok, Thailand, where he researched a substitute doctoral topic, the social structure of the Chinese community in Thailand. He finished his PhD in 1954. This research was published in his first two books, Chinese Society in Thailand (1957) and Leadership and Power in the Chinese Community of Thailand (1958)

Between 1951 and 1955, he was field director of the Cornell Southeast Asia Program, then a research associate at Cornell. He became assistant professor of anthropology at Columbia University in 1958. Two years later, Skinner was hired back at Cornell as associate professor and then promoted to full professor in 1962 — an unusually fast track to that status. In 1965, he left for Stanford University, where he taught and advised students for 25 years. In the 1960s, he was able to return to mainland China, where he did work focused largely on the Chinese urban environment. He moved again in 1990 to the University of California, Davis, which had hired his wife, China historian Susan L. Mann. Skinner retired from teaching in 2005 but maintained an active research program until his death three years later.

== Research and Contribution ==
=== Regional Analysis ===
Skinner's best-known influence on Chinese Studies was his delineation of the Physiographic macroregions of China. In later years he was instrumental in the establishment of the China Historical Geographic Information Systems project at Harvard and Fudan Universities. His papers and maps are archived in the library collections of Harvard, Cornell, the University of Washington, and Fudan University.

==== Marketing and Social Structure in Rural China ====
Skinner's landmark three-part article, "Marketing and Social Structure in Rural China" (1964-65), remains a cornerstone of anthropological research. In Part I, he analyzed the organization of premodern Chinese marketing systems, demonstrating how periodic marketplaces connected villages into cohesive networks and linked them to higher-level urban centers. He argued that these systems shaped social and cultural boundaries, including those of kinship, language, class, and religion. Parts II and III examined the transition to modern marketing under communist collectivization, showing how traditional structures were adapted to preserve village communities and market areas. Skinner's work not only redefined the study of agrarian marketing systems but also highlighted their integration with broader social, political, and cultural dynamics, inspiring further research across the globe.

==== Family Systems ====
In his later career, Skinner deepened his interest and research into demography, especially on kinship and family systems. Particularly, he wanted to examine and understand how kinship systems and household organization affect economic and demographic behavior in various places, including China, Japan, and France. He also examined these correlations by studying demographic shifts throughout different periods in the modern history of these three countries. Additionally, he was interested in applying his "regional analysis" and "family systems theory" to study elsewhere other than China. Scholars have considered this particular regional shift as an effort to move beyond the limitations of area studies. Although he has published countless articles and books on China, he has written abundant materials on the family systems in Meiji Japan, and many of these academic works are unpublished. He also gave speeches and talks to Stanford alumni during his stay in Tokyo.

==== Department Politics ====
Skinner has also impacted the department politics of the Department of Anthropology at Stanford. When he chaired the admission committee, he decided to make the process gender-blind despite the opposition of his colleagues. Eventually, the department welcomed an all-female entering class. Many of his students later moved into neo-Marxist critical anthropology of the 1970s and 1980s. In 1983, Skinner's advisee Steven Mosher was dismissed from the PhD program over ethical charges related to research conduct in China.

==== Archives ====
Skinner's unpublished research material is housed in various locations, including the Center for Studies in Demography and Ecology at the University of Washington and the Fairbank Center at Harvard University.

== Publications ==
Books and monographs

- Report on the Chinese in Southeast Asia. Ithaca: Cornell University, Southeast Asia Program, 1951. 91 pp. (Data papers 1).
- (General editor) The Social Sciences and Thailand. Bangkok: Cornell Research Center, 1956. 185 + 125 pp. (in Thai and English).
- Chinese Society in Thailand: An Analytical History. Ithaca: Cornell University Press, 1957. xvii + 459 pp. (Japanese edition: Bangkok: Japanese Chamber of Commerce, 1973, 365 pp.).
- Leadership and Power in the Chinese Community of Thailand. Ithaca: Cornell University Press, 1958. xvii +363 pp. (Monographs of the Association for Asian Studies, III). (Japanese edition: Tokyo: Ajia Keizai Kenkyujo, 1961. 417 pp.). (Reprinted 1979 by Universities Microfilm International).
- (Editor) Local, Ethnic, and National Loyalties in Village Indonesia: A Symposium. New Haven: Yale University, Southeast Asia Studies, 1959. 68 pp.
- (Editor) Modern Chinese Society: An Analytical Bibliography, Vol. 1, Publications in Western Languages, 1644–1972. Stanford: Stanford University Press, 1973. 1xxviii + 802 pp.
- (Editor, with Winston Hsieh) Modern Chinese Society: An Analytical Bibliography, Vol. 2, Publications in Chinese, 1644–1969. Stanford University Press, 1973. lxxci + 802 pp.
- (Editor, with Shigeaki Tomita) Modern Chinese Society: An Analytical Bibliography, Vol. 3, Publications in Japanese, 1644–1971. Stanford: Stanford University Press, 1973. 1xix + 531 pp.
- (Editor, with Mark Elvin) The Chinese City Between Two Worlds. Stanford: Stanford University Press, 1974. xiii + 458 pp.
- (Editor, with A. Thomas Kirsch) Change and Persistence in Thai Society: Essays in Honor of Lauriston Sharp. Ithaca: Cornell University Press, 1975. 386 pp.
- (Editor) The City in Late Imperial China. Stanford: Stanford University Press, 1977. xvii + 820 pp.
- (Editor) The Study of Chinese Society: Essays by Maurice Freedman. Stanford: Stanford University Press, 1979. xxiv + 491 pp.
- Rural China on the Eve of Revolution. University of Washington Press, 2017. 280 pp.

Articles and book chapters

- Aftermath of Communist liberation in the Chengtu Plain. Pacific Affairs 24, 1 (Mar. 1951): 61–76.
- The new sociology of China. Far Eastern Quarterly 14, 4 (Aug. 1951): 365–371.
- Peasant organization in rural China. Annals of the American Academy of Political and Social Science 277 (Sept. 1951): 89–100.
- A study in miniature of Chinese population. Population Studies 5, 2 (Nov. 1951): 91–103. (Reprinted in Social Demography, edited by Thomas R. Ford and Gordon F. De Jong. Englewood Cliffs, NJ: Prentice-Hall, 1970, 642–656.)
- Cultural values, social structure and population growth. Population Bulletin of the United Nations 5 (July 1956): 5–12.
- The unity of the social sciences. In The Social Sciences and Thailand. Bangkok: Cornell Research Center, 1956, 3–6. (In Thai and English).
- Chinese assimilation and Thai politics. Journal of Asian Studies 16, 2 (Feb. 1957): 237–250. (Reprinted in Southeast Asia: The Politics of National Integration, edited by John T. McAlister, Jr. New York: Random House, 1973, 383–398.)
- The Chinese of Java. In Colloquium on Overseas Chinese, edited by Morton H. Fried. New York: Institute of Pacific Relations, 1958, 1–10.
- Overseas Chinese in Southeast Asia. Annals of the American Academy of Political and Social Science 321 (Jan. 1959): 136–147.
- The nature of loyalties in rural Indonesia. In Local, Ethnic and National Loyalties in Village Indonesia: A Symposium. New Haven: Yale University, Southeast Asia Studies, 1959, 1–11. (Reprinted in Social Change: The Colonial Situation, edited by Immanuel M. Wallerstein. New York: Wiley, 1966, 265–277.)
- Change and persistence in Chinese culture overseas: A comparison of Thailand and Java. Journal of the South Seas Society 16 (1960): 86100. (Reprinted in Readings in South-east Asian Anthropology, edited by Donald J. Tugby. Brisbane: University of Queensland Press, 1967. Reprinted in Southeast Asia: The Politics of National Integration, edited by John T. McAlister, Jr. New York: Random House, 1973, 399–415.)
- Java's Chinese minority: Continuity and change. Journal of Asian Studies 20, 3 (May 1961): 353–362.
- The Chinese minority. In Indonesia, edited by Ruth T. McVey. New Haven: HRAF Press, 1963, 97–117. (Indonesian translation: Golongan minoritas Tionghoa. In Golongan Etnis Tionghoa di Indonesia, edited by Mely G. Tan. Jakarta: Penderbit PT Gramedia, 1979, 1–29.)
- What the study of China can do for social science. Journal of Asian Studies 23, 4 (Aug. 1964): 517–522. [Chinese translation in Ta-hsüeh sheng-huo (Hong Kong) 6 (1966): 8–13.]
- The Thailand Chinese: Assimilation in a changing society. Asia 2 (Autumn 1964): 80–92.
- Marketing and social structure in rural China, Parts I, II, and III. Journal of Asian Studies 24, 1 (Nov. 1964): 3–44; 24, 2 (Feb. 1965): 195–228; 24, 3 (May 1965): 363–399. (Part I reprinted in Peasant Society: A Reader, edited by Jack M. Potter et al. Boston: Little, Brown, 1967, 63–93; and in Man, Space and Environment: Concepts in Contemporary Human Geography, edited by Paul Ward English and Robert C. Mayfield. New York: Oxford University Press, 1972, 561–601. Parts I, II, and III separately reprinted in Bobbs Merrill reprint series. Reissued 1974, 1977, 1981, 1988, 1994, and 2000 as a pamphlet by the Association for Asian Studies. Japanese edition: Kyoto: Horitse Bunka Sha, 1979. 222 p.)
- Communication (on marketing systems in Communist China). Journal of Asian Studies 25, 2 (Feb. 1966): 319–324.
- Overseas Chinese leadership: Paradigm for a paradox. In Leadership and Authority, edited by Gehan Wijeyewardene. Singapore: University of Malaya Press, 1968, 191–207.
- (with Edwin A. Winckler) Compliance succession in rural Communist China: A cyclical theory. In A Sociological Reader on Complex Organization, 2nd ed., edited by Amitai Etzioni. New York: Holt, Rinehart, and Winston, 1969, 410–438.
- Chinese peasants and the closed community: An open and shut case. Comparative Studies in Society and History 13, 3 (July, 1971): 270–281.
- (with Arthur P. Wolf) Maurice Freedman (1920–75) [obituary]. China Quarterly 63 (Sept. 1975): i–iii
- Maurice Freedman, 1920–1975, and Bibliography of Maurice Freedman. American Anthropologist 78, 4 (Dec. 1976): 871–885.
- Mobility strategies in late imperial China: A regional-systems analysis. In Regional Analysis, Vol. 1. Economic Systems, edited by Carol A. Smith. New York: Academic Press, 1976, 327–364.
- Urban development in imperial China [Part One introduction]. In The City in Late Imperial China, edited by G. William Skinner. Stanford: Stanford University Press, 1977, 3–31.
- Urban and rural in Chinese society [Part Two introduction]. In The City in Late Imperial China. Stanford: Stanford University Press, 1977, 253–273.
- Urban social structure in Ch'ing China [Part Three introduction]. In The City in Late Imperial China. Stanford: Stanford University Press, 1977, 521–553.
- Regional urbanization in nineteenth-century China. In The City in Late Imperial China. Stanford: Stanford University Press, 1977, 211–249.
- Cities and the hierarchy of local systems. In The City in Late Imperial China. Stanford: Stanford University Press, 275–364. (Reprinted in Studies in Chinese Society, edited by Arthur P. Wolf. Stanford: Stanford University Press, 1978, 1–77.)
- Vegetable supply and marketing in Chinese cities. China Quarterly 76 (Dec. 1978): 733–793.
- Introduction. In The Study of Chinese Society: Essays by Maurice Freedman. Stanford: Stanford University Press, 1979, xi–xxiv.
- Vegetable supply and marketing in Chinese cities. In Vegetable Farming Systems in China, edited by Donald L. Plucknett and Halsey L. Beemer, Jr. Boulder, CO: Westview Press, 1981, 215–280.
- Chinese history and the social sciences. In Chinese Social and Economic History from the Song to 1900, edited by Albert Feuerwerker. Ann Arbor: University of Michigan, Center for Chinese Studies, 1982, 11–6.
- Asian studies and the disciplines. Asian Studies Newsletter 19, 4 (Apr. 1984).
- Rural marketing in China: Revival and reappraisal. In Markets and Marketing: Proceedings of the 1984 Meeting of the Society for Economic Anthropology, edited by Stuart Plattner. Lanham, Md: University Press of America, 1985, 7–47.
- Presidential address: The structure of Chinese history. Journal of Asian Studies 44, 2 (Feb. 1985): 271–292.
- Rural marketing in China: Repression and revival. China Quarterly 102 (Sept. 1985): 393–413.
- Sichuan's population in the nineteenth century: Lessons from disaggregated data. Late Imperial China 8, 1 (June 1987): 1–79.
- Conjugal power in Tokugawa Japanese families: A matter of life or death. In Sex and Gender Hierarchies, edited by Barbara D. Miller. New York: Cambridge University Press, 1993, 236–270.
- Differential development in Lingnan. In The Economic Transformation of South China: Reform and Development in the Post-Mao Era, edited by Thomas P. Lyons and Victor Nee. Ithaca: Cornell East Asia Program, 1994, 17–54.
- Creolized Chinese societies in Southeast Asia. In Sojourners and Settlers: Histories of Southeast Asia and the Chinese, edited by Anthony Reid. Sydney: Allen and Unwin, 1996, 50–93.
- Family systems and demographic processes. In Anthropological Demography: Toward a New Synthesis, edited by David I. Kertzer and Thomas E. Fricke. Chicago: University of Chicago Press, 1997, 53–114.
- Introduction (and maps). In Migration and Ethnicity in Chinese History: Hakkas, Pengmin, and their Neighbors, by Sow-Theng Leong. Stanford: Stanford University Press, 1997, 1–18.
- Chinese cities, then and now: The difference a century makes. In Cosmopolitan Capitalists: Hong Kong and the Chinese Diaspora at the End of the Twentieth Century. Seattle: University of Washington Press, 1999, 56–79.
- (with Mark Henderson and Yuan Jianhua) China's fertility transition through regional space: Using GIS and census data for a spatial analysis of historical demography. Social Science History 24, 3 (Fall 2000): 613–643.

== Sources ==
- Brian Niiya, "Navy Japanese Language School", "https://encyclopedia.densho.org/Navy_Japanese_Language_School/" Last updated 2024-17-03.
- U.S. Navy Japanese Language School collection, "https://archives.colorado.edu/repositories/2/resources/1514."
- History of the Department of Asian Studies, Cornell University, "https://asianstudies.cornell.edu/history."
- History of the Department of Anthropology, Cornell University, "https://anthropology.cornell.edu/department-history."
- Lauriston Sharp (1950), "Preface," Report on the Chinese in Southeast Asia (written by Skinner in 1950, and published in 1951).
- Harrell, Stevan (2009). "In Memoriam: G. William Skinner, 1925–2008". The China Quarterly. 198: 453–458. doi:10.1017/S0305741009000411.
- Daniel Little, "G. William Skinner", The China Beat 2008-17-11.
