= David Saperstein (SEC official) =

American lawyer and SEC division director (1901–1990)

- Born: June 14, 1901; Hoboken, New Jersey, U.S.
- Died: December 28, 1990 (aged 89); North Bergen, New Jersey, U.S.
- Occupations: Lawyer; regulator
- Known for: Director of the SEC's Division of Trading and Exchange; 1937 “Saperstein Interpretation” concerning exchange specialists

David Saperstein (June 14, 1901 – December 28, 1990) was an American lawyer and government regulator associated with the creation and early administration of the United States Securities and Exchange Commission (SEC). He served as associate counsel to the Pecora Commission and later directed the SEC's Division of Trading and Exchange under Chairman Joseph P. Kennedy Sr.. Saperstein was also associated with the drafting and early administration of the Securities Exchange Act of 1934.

== Early life and education ==
Saperstein was born on June 14, 1901, in Hoboken, New Jersey. His father, Samuel Saperstein, worked for Prudential Insurance in Hudson County. Saperstein attended public schools in Weehawken and graduated from Hoboken High School, then known as Demarest High School. He received a Bachelor of Arts degree from New York University in 1921 and a Bachelor of Laws degree from Columbia Law School in 1923.

Before entering federal service, Saperstein practiced law in Union City, New Jersey. In 1934, contemporary financial press reported that he was retiring from the Union City law firm of Platoff, Saperstein & Platoff to take up his SEC duties in Washington, D.C.

== Relationship with Philip M. Lovell ==
Philip M. Lovell, the Los Angeles naturopath and architectural patron born Morris Saperstein, was Saperstein's uncle. Lovell became known for his health column in the Los Angeles Times and for commissioning Richard Neutra's Lovell Health House in Los Angeles.

In the early 1930s, Saperstein accompanied Lovell on a trip to the Soviet Union. Historian Gary Marmorstein's study of Lovell discusses the trip in connection with Lovell's broader interest in health reform, food, architecture, and social planning. The episode has been noted in scholarship on Lovell and the Lovell Health House, but it was separate from Saperstein's later work at the SEC.

== Pecora Commission ==
During the Senate investigation of stock-exchange practices, Saperstein served as associate counsel to the United States Senate Committee on Banking and Currency under chief counsel Ferdinand Pecora. Hearing transcripts from March 1934 list “Julius Silver and David Saperstein, associate counsel to the committee.”

Saperstein's work on the investigation included staff supervision and related hearings. A July 1934 account in the Commercial and Financial Chronicle, quoting reports from The New York Times, stated that Saperstein had been with the Senate Committee on Banking and Currency since January 24, 1933, first as associate counsel and later as acting counsel, and that he had supervised staff gathering facts on banking and stock-market conditions. His obituary in The New York Times later credited him with helping draft the legislation that became the Securities Exchange Act of 1934.

== U.S. Securities and Exchange Commission ==
=== Appointment and responsibilities ===
In July 1934, SEC Chairman Joseph P. Kennedy Sr. appointed Saperstein of New Jersey as chief of the SEC's Stock Market Trading Division, later known as the Division of Trading and Exchange. The SEC Historical Society identifies Saperstein as the director of the Trading and Exchange Division and describes that division as overseeing the registration of securities brokers and dealers, rules for practices such as short selling, and the detection of unlawful practices.

A resident of Cliffside Park, New Jersey, Saperstein commuted to his federal work in Washington, D.C. Contemporary accounts reported that the trading and exchange division was expected to supervise exchanges and help prevent violations of the Securities Exchange Act's restrictions on pool operations, wash sales, matched orders, and other forms of stock-market manipulation.

Saperstein also worked on policy questions involving the separation of broker and dealer functions. In 1936, he prepared or presented a study titled Report on the Feasibility and Advisability of the Complete Segregation of the Functions of Dealer and Broker, which discussed conflicts that could arise when brokerage firms combined agency, advisory, underwriting, and trading functions.

=== The "Saperstein Interpretation" ===
In 1937, the SEC issued an interpretation concerning specialists on securities exchanges that later became known as the "Saperstein Interpretation". A later SEC notice described the interpretation as a letter by Saperstein, then director of the Commission's Trading and Exchange Division, to the presidents of exchanges with specialist systems.

The interpretation addressed the so-called Tenth Rule, which limited specialists' proprietary trades to dealings “reasonably necessary” to maintain a fair and orderly market. According to the SEC's later summary, the interpretation required each specialist transaction for the specialist's own account to meet a reasonable-necessity test, and it rejected the idea that a specialist could show compliance merely by proving that a transaction had no discernible harmful market effect.

The SEC later described the Saperstein Interpretation as part of the historical basis for specialist stabilization requirements. In 2006, the Commission revisited the trade-by-trade application of the interpretation in connection with New York Stock Exchange rule changes, stating that automation, competition, and changes in market structure had altered the environment in which specialists operated. The Commission stated that specialists would remain subject to the negative obligation to limit proprietary trading to transactions reasonably necessary to maintain a fair and orderly market, while removing the requirement that each individual trade be measured under the older trade-by-trade test.

=== Departure ===
Saperstein was mentioned in 1937 as a possible candidate for SEC commissioner, but he returned to private practice for family reasons.

== Private practice ==
After leaving government service, Saperstein joined the New York law firm Silver, Saperstein & Barnett, later Silver, Saperstein, Barnett & Solomon. He represented Polaroid Corporation in federal litigation, including Polaroid Corp. v. Casselman (1962), in which the court listed Silver, Saperstein & Barnett as counsel for Polaroid and named Julius Silver, David Saperstein, and Isaac M. Barnett as of counsel. He remained a corporate lawyer until retiring in 1982.

== Death and family ==
Saperstein died on December 28, 1990, at Palisades General Hospital in North Bergen, New Jersey, at age 89. He had lived in Weehawken, New Jersey. He was survived by his wife, Louise Lederer; two children, Sue Bernstein and Roy Saperstein; a sister; six grandchildren; and two great-grandchildren.

== Legacy ==
Saperstein's work at the SEC remained a point of reference in later debates over the regulation of exchange specialists and market structure. In a 1991 letter to The New York Times, legal scholar Norman S. Poser described the Saperstein Interpretation as an important early effort to reduce conflicts of interest and trading advantages enjoyed by specialists.

== See also ==
- Philip M. Lovell
- Polaroid Corporation
- Pecora Commission
- Securities Exchange Act of 1934
