= John Newman (sculptor) =

American sculptor (born 1952)

John Newman is an American sculptor. He was born in Flushing, Queens in 1952. He received his B.A. from Oberlin College (1973). He attended the Whitney Museum Independent Study Program in 1972 and received his M.F.A. in 1975 from the Yale School of Art. He was a fellow at the Center for Advanced Visual Studies at MIT from 1975 to 1978. He is based in New York City.

== Career ==
Newman came of age as a sculptor in the late 1970s and early 1980s. He has had over 50 solo exhibitions and participated in numerous group exhibitions in galleries and museums throughout the United States, Europe, and Asia. His sculptures, drawings, and prints are represented in numerous public collections, including the Museum of Modern Art, New York, the Metropolitan Museum of Art, New York, the Whitney Museum of American Art, New York, the Tate Modern in London, the National Gallery of Australia, Canberra, and the Albertina in Vienna, and the Storm King Art Center, New York, among many others.

Newman is the recipient of many awards and residencies, including the Rome Prize, the Civitella Ranieri Foundation, the Guggenheim Foundation, the Joan Mitchell Foundation, the Pollock-Krasner Foundation, and a Senior Research Fulbright Grant to India. In 2015, he completed a residency at the Chinati Foundation in Marfa, Texas.

Newman is the former director of graduate studies in sculpture at the Yale School of Art. He currently teaches at the New York Studio School of Drawing, Painting and Sculpture and the School of Visual Arts in New York City. He has been commissioned to do several large-scale sculptures for the City of Richmond, Virginia, Dai Nippon in Tokyo, Storm King Art Center, and Grounds for Sculpture in Hamilton, New Jersey.

== In print ==
In his interview with Newman, which was published in the April 2012 issue of The Brooklyn Rail, its co-founder Phong Bui addressed his use of different materials and techniques, including Calcutta basket weaving, Bengali brass casting, and hariko techniques, to mix them up with practices from the West. In response, Newman said:

"I want to be very careful not to be a cultural tourist! I’m the filter of all of those experiences, which only occurs after I am back in the studio. [...] traveling allowed me to step out of the concealed contradictions that are embedded within a system; in this case the system is the art world, where so many of my contemporaries were making art about art, or how art connects to larger spheres of contexts, meaning the gallery space, the gallery system, or art’s possible social relevancy..."

In his Selected Writings, the artist Carroll Dunham notes about Newman's work:

"Newman’s mature work has evolved in methodical opposition to these commandments. It is intimate, materially omnivorous, hyper-spatially curvy, dissonantly evocative, eccentrically constructed, and defiantly connected to a notion of sculpture as abstract statuary, a three-dimensional site of anthropomorphized contemplation (the sort of art Ad Reinhardt described as “something you back into when you’re looking at a painting”)."

== Solo exhibitions ==
Newman has exhibited his work since 1977. His earliest national shows were hosted by the CUNY Graduate Center Mall, New York and the Center for Advanced Visual Studies, MIT, Cambridge, Massachusetts.

In 2016, the Beeler Gallery at Columbus College of Art and Design, in Columbus, Ohio, hosted “Possible in Principle.” In 2013, the Jaffe-Friede Gallery at Dartmouth College in Hanover, New Hampshire hosted “Everything is on the Table.” Newman's exhibition “Instruments of Argument” was hosted by the New York Studio School Gallery in 2009 and in 2007, the Sarah Moody Gallery of Art at the University of Alabama, Tuscaloosa, presented an exhibition as well. In 2005, his exhibition entitled "Monkey Wrenches and Household Saints" was shown at the Clifford Gallery at Colgate University (catalogue). In addition, he exhibited at Amherst College, Amherst, Massachusetts (1999), Grounds for Sculpture, Johnson Atelier, Mercerville, New Jersey (1998), Tyler Graphics, Mt. Kisco, New York (catalogue) (1995), Ft. Wayne Museum of Art, Ft. Wayne, Indiana (1993); Arkansas Art Center, Little Rock (catalogue)(1993), Reed College, Portland, Oregon (1981), and many others.

== Statement ==
In 2013, Newman stated: "People often misunderstand my work as surreal, because they see these disparate things. And because it’s not seemingly geometric or representational, it’s something that is not easily categorizable.”

== Works in public collections ==
- Addison Gallery of American Art, Andover, Massachusetts
- Akron Art Museum, Akron, Ohio
- Allen Art Museum, Oberlin College, Oberlin, Ohio
- The Albertina Museum, Vienna, Austria
- Albright-Knox Art Gallery
- Arkansas Art Center
- Art Institute of Chicago
- Bank of Boston
- Belger Family Foundation, Kansas City, Missouri
- Boca Raton Art Museum
- The Brooklyn Museum
- Chase Manhattan Bank
- Chemical Bank
- Colby College Museum, Maine
- Dallas Museum of Art
- Dannheiser Foundation
- Department of Transportation, Washington, DC
- Deutsche Bank
- Des Moines Art Center
- Farnsworth Museum of Art, Maine
- Fidelity Investments
- First Bank System, Inc., Minneapolis
- The Fogg Art Museum
- Fort Wayne Museum
- General Mills Corporation
- Grand Rapids Museum
- High Museum of Art
- Honolulu Museum of Art
- Hood Museum, Dartmouth College
- Joslyn Museum, Omaha, Nebraska
- Library of Congress, DC
- List Center for the Visual Arts, MIT
- Los Angeles County Museum of Art
- McNay Art Museum, San Antonio, TX
- Mellon Bank, Pittsburgh, Pennsylvania
- Metropolitan Museum of Art
- Minneapolis Institute of Art, Minneapolis
- Mississippi Museum of Art, Jackson, Mississippi
- Sarah Moody Gallery of Art, University of Alabama, Tuscaloosa
- The Morgan Library
- Museum of Fine Arts, Boston
- Museum of Fine Arts, Houston
- Museum of Modern Art
- The Nasher Collection, Dallas
- The Nasher Museum of Art at Duke University
- National Academy Museum
- National Gallery of Berlin
- National Gallery of Australia, Canberra
- Nelson Atkins Museum
- New York Public Library
- Orlando Museum of Art
- Parrish Museum
- Palm Springs Art Museum
- Philadelphia Museum
- Portland Museum of Art, Maine
- Prudential Insurance
- Sammlung Hoffman, Berlin
- Sheldon Memorial Art Gallery, Lincoln, Nebraska
- Staatliche Graphische Sammlung, Munich
- St. Louis Art Museum
- Storm King Art Center
- Southwestern Bell
- Tang Museum, Sarasota Springs, New York
- Tate Gallery, London
- University of Colorado/Boulder Art Museum
- Walker Art Center
- Whitney Museum of American Art
- Worcester Art Museum
- Yale Art Gallery

== Bibliography ==
2020

Sarah Bahr, Ensnared by the Fine Art of Scam”, NY Times, Oct. 12t

2016

Will Heinrich, “Art in Review: John Newman and Jo Nigoghossian,” NY Times, Nov. 18th

Carroll Dunham, “Into words: the collected writings of Carroll Dunham: John Newman”, Badlands Unlimited

Anderson Turner, “Intersections at Akron Art Museum will expand your horizons,” Akron Beacon Journal, October, 14th

2014

R.C. Baker, “The New Surreal”, Village Voice, May 14–20, Vol. LIX, No. 20

Peter Frank, “Get your Quick and Dirty Arts Education Haiku”, Huffington Post, September 5

2013

Ken Johnson, “ Going Solo Has Its Day, in a Hodgepodge Style”, New York Times, March 8

2012

“John Newman and B. Wurtz”, BOMB, No. 120, Summer 2012

“In conversation: John Newman with Phong Bui”, The Brooklyn Rail, April

Peter Plagens, “Balancing Grit with Wit”, Wall St. Journal, March 17-18th

2009

Roberta Smith, “John Newman”’ New York Times, February 27th

Stephen Mueller, “John Newman: New York Studio School”, Art in America, May

Ben La Rocco, “John Newman”, The Brooklyn Rail, March

Stephanie Buhmann, “Exploratory Territories”, The Villager, Volume 78, Number 37 February 18–24

2006

Roberta Smith, "Critic's Notebook: Chelsea Is a battlefield: Galleries Muster Groups”, New York Times, July 28

David Cateforis, "John Newman at the Byron C. Cohen Gallery", REVIEW, December 2006

Ken Johnson, "From carved creatures to Disneyland rugs", Boston Globe, September 26

Stephanie Buhmann, "Review", Sculpture Magazine, April 2006, Vol. 25, No.3

2005

Laurie Simmons, "Artists on Artists". BOMB, Summer 2005, Number 92

Linda Yablonsky, "Why Small Sculpture is Big", Artnews, December

2003

Roberta Smith, "John Newman", New York Times, Friday, May 30" Sandra Wolfer, "Sculptures find niche at seniors' home", Daily news, July 3 Roy Proctor, “Look up in the sky!”, Richmond Times Dispatch, Nov. 14th Paulette Roberts-Pullen, “Art around us”, Style Weekly, Richmond, Virginia, Nov. 26th

2001

Janet Koplos, "John Newman at Von Lintel and Nusser", Art in America, November

Grace Glueck, "John Newman: Homespun", New York Times, Friday, May 18

Linda Yablonsky, "John Newman: Homespun", TimeOut, May 3–10, 2001

Mario Naves, "Creepy Fetishes, Lazy Eyes, Bad Boys in the West 20's", New York Observer

Daniel Rothbart,"The Protean Forms of John Newman", NY Arts, April, Vol. 6, No. 4

Edith Newhall, "Talent-Material Culture", New York Magazine, May 7, 2001,

Will Jones, "Station's sculpture stirs up a buzz", Richmond Times-Dispatch, Nov. 22

H. Peter Stern and others, "Earth, Sky and Sculpture: Storm King Art Center"

Raphael Rubinstein, "A Stealth Revolution in Sculpture: John Newman", catalogue essay for GrandArts exhibition

Nancy Princenthal, " Homespun", catalogue essay for Edition Von Lintel and Nusser

Robin Trafton, ""C" is for Contrast", Kansas City Star, Dec. 7th, 2001

Janet Purcell, "Grounds for Celebration", Trenton Times, June 14
