= Barbara Morgan (photographer) =

American photographer

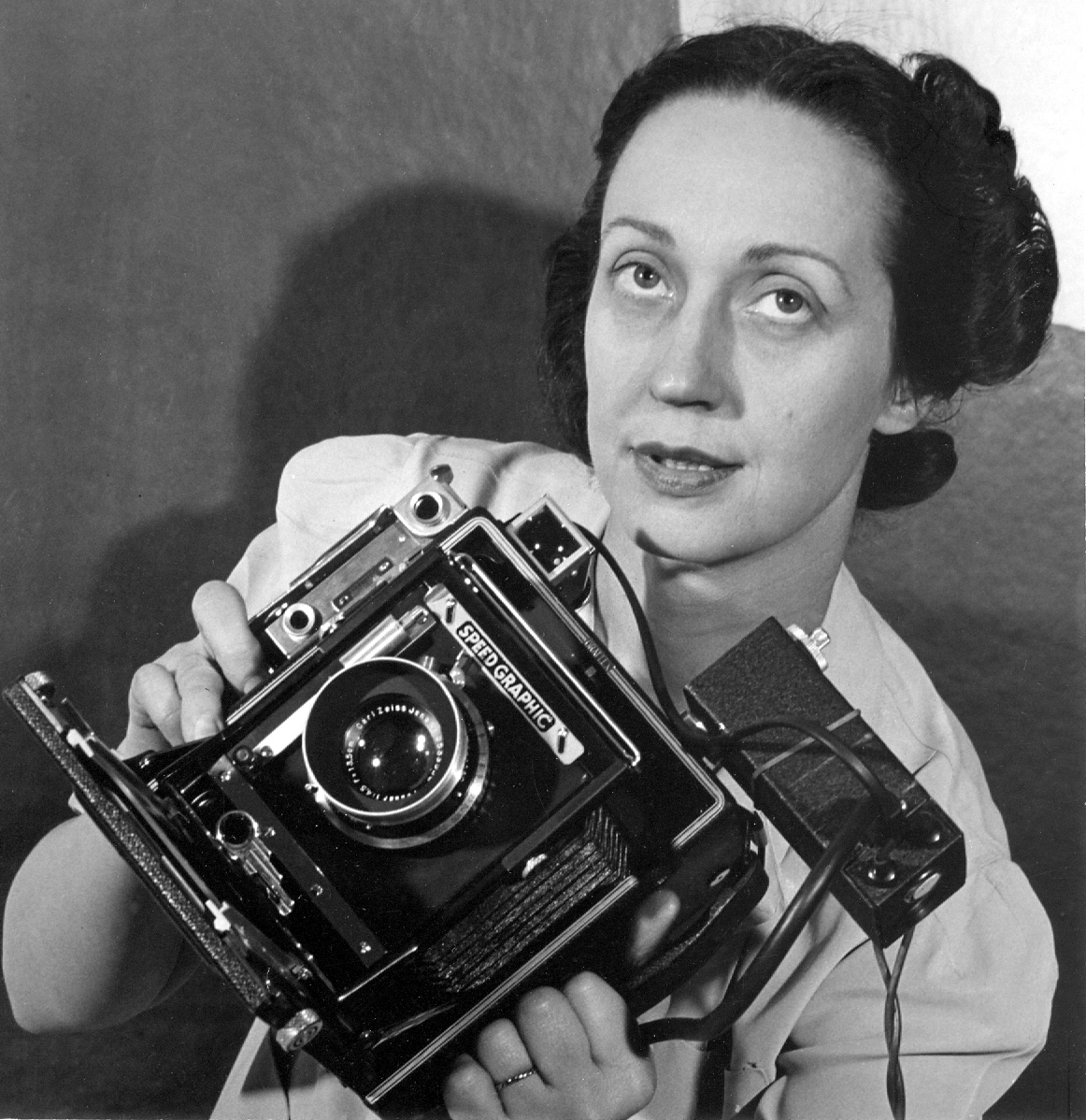
- Morgan in 1940
- Born: Barbara Brooks Johnson; July 8, 1900; Buffalo, Kansas
- Died: August 17, 1992 (aged 92); North Tarrytown, New York
- Known for: Photography
- Spouse: Willard D. Morgan
- Awards: American Society of Magazine Photographers Lifetime Achievement Award (1988)

Barbara Morgan (July 8, 1900 – August 17, 1992) was an American photographer best known for her depictions of modern dancers. She was a co-founder of the photography magazine Aperture.

Morgan is known in the visual art and dance worlds for her penetrating studies of American modern dancers Martha Graham, Merce Cunningham, Erick Hawkins, José Limón, Doris Humphrey, Charles Weidman and others. Morgan's drawings, prints, watercolors and paintings were exhibited widely in California in the 1920s, and in New York and Philadelphia in the 1930s.

== Biography ==
=== Early life and education ===
Barbara Brooks Johnson was born on July 8, 1900, in Buffalo, Kansas. Her family moved to the West Coast that same year and she grew up on a Southern California peach ranch.

Her art training at UCLA, from 1919 to 1923, was based on Arthur Wesley Dow's principles of art “synthesis.” Abstract design was taught parallel to figurative drawing and painting. Art history was taught with significant emphasis on the primitive, Asian, and European artistic traditions. While a student, Johnson read from the Chinese Six Canons of Painting, about “rhythmic vitality”, or essence of life force, described as the artist's goal of expression. This concept related directly to her father's teaching that all things are made of “dancing atoms,” and remained a guiding philosophy throughout her life as an artist.

Johnson joined the faculty at UCLA in 1925, and became an advocate for modern art when many of her colleagues were oriented to a more traditional approach to art. She exhibited her drawings, prints and watercolors throughout California. In 1929, Los Angeles Times critic Arthur Miller wrote: “One of the finest sets of prints in the show is that by Barbara Morgan, and these chance also to be the most abstract works here. … Miss Morgan serves it with an aesthetic sauce that is not produced in a casual kitchen. So abstract has she become that we see her taking hints from Kandinsky, arch abstractionist of them all.” In the same year, Prudence Wollet of the Los Angeles Times wrote: “For out and out independence, Barbara Morgan has taken the most liberties yet… I contend that this experimenter bears watching.”

In 1925, Barbara Johnson married Willard D. Morgan, a writer who illustrated his articles with his own photographs. Barbara assisted Willard in photographing the modern architecture of Frank Lloyd Wright and Richard Neutra, including a full documentation of the building of the Lovell House. Willard saw the importance of photography, which he claimed to be the real modern art of the twentieth century. Barbara continued to paint, feeling that photography was “useful only as record.” In 1927, Barbara co-curated an exhibition of Edward Weston's work with colleague Annita Delano in the UCLA Gallery. Weston's rich, brilliant prints of Californian and Mexican subject matter “rang the bell” for her when she was hanging this show at UCLA, although she found them "too static for [her] own style".

In 1932, she gave birth to her first son, Douglas O. Morgan, who later married photographer Liliane de Cock. In 1935, she gave birth to her second son, Lloyd B. Morgan.

=== Work in the Southwestern US ===
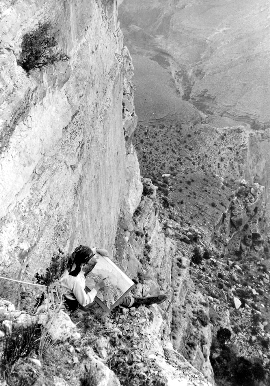
Morgan painting the Grand Canyon in 1928. Photograph by Willard Morgan

Every summer when classes were over, Willard and Barbara loaded their car, with painting and photography equipment and headed for the desert. Barbara painted as much as possible for winter exhibits and helped Willard photograph for articles. Willard had two Model A Leicas, with which the couple photographed each other in cliff ruins, climbing Rainbow Bridge, in the Hopi mesas and canyons. The resulting photographs were among the first 35mm images to appear in American magazines illustrating Willard's articles.

Morgan's Southwest experiences were deeply influential to her. The stratification of Grand Canyon and Monument Valley attuned her to geologic time; Mesa Verde Cliff Dwellings to ancient human time. The Navajo and Pueblo Indian tribes through ritual dance displayed their “partnership in the cosmic process” and connected her to a universal primal.

=== Work in New York City ===
In response to Willard's Leica-illustrated articles, E. Leitz, Inc. offered him a job publicizing the new 35mm camera, and the couple moved to New York City in the summer of 1930. After one year traveling the east with Willard, Barbara set up a printmaking studio in 1931 on 23rd street opposite Washington Square Park in New York City. Carl Zigrosser of the Weyhe Gallery (NYC) exhibited her woodcuts and new lithographs of city themes. The impact of the city, its masses of people, traffic, buildings and the east, were in counterpoint to her memories of the Southwest. Out of this subject matter, symbolic forms emerged and she began to paint more abstractly, exhibiting her new work in a solo show at the Mellon Gallery in Philadelphia. While at UCLA, Barbara had been offered a scholarship by Dr. Albert Barnes, so while traveling the east, she visited his art collection in Merion, Pennsylvania. As a form of study, he allowed Willard and Barbara to photograph his entire collection. While photographing a Sudan fertility icon and an Ivory Coast totemic mask, Barbara discovered that she could make these ritual sculptures seem either menacing or benign, simply by control of lighting. This experience of dramatization of controllable meanings by light manipulation became the prelude to her “psychological lighting” of dance for camera compositions.

Barbara Morgan was deeply involved in the American Artists' Congress from its inception in 1936 and served as an exhibition committee member during Stuart Davis' presidency of the Congress from 1937 to 1939.

=== Photography ===
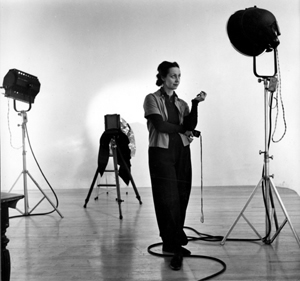
Morgan in her studio, 1941

With two young children, Douglas born in 1932 and Lloyd in 1935, Barbara sought a workable way to be both a mother and an artist. To abandon painting in favor of photography seemed extreme, but for two saving factors; first, the emergence of an idea for a future book, and second, not requiring the uninterrupted daylight hours that painting does, and one could work at night in the darkroom. Although Barbara had exposed thousands of images, she still did not consider herself a photographer because she had not completed a cycle of developing and printing her own work. Thus she set up a new studio with a darkroom at 10 East 23rd Street, overlooking Madison Square, and began experimenting with the technical and darkroom aspects of photography in 1931. Barbara learned processing from Willard and worked on other gaps in her technique, chiefly with the 4x5 Speed Graphic camera and Leica with all lenses. She worked with Harold Harvey as he was perfecting his all temperature Replenishing Fine Grain Developer 777. During this time she started to explore photomontage.

Morgan was an early member of the Photo League in New York. Her photographs were included in the League's exhibition "This Is the Photo League" in 1949 The Barbara Morgan Estate is represented by Bruce Silverstein Gallery in New York, NY

=== Dance photography ===
In 1935 Barbara attended a performance of the young Martha Graham Dance Company. She was immediately struck with the historical and social importance of the emerging American Modern Dance movement:

“The photographers and painters who dealt with the Depression, often, it seemed to me, only added to defeatism without giving courage or hope. Yet the galvanizing protest danced by Martha Graham, Humphrey-Weidman, Tamiris and others was heartening. Often nearly starving, they never gave up, but forged life affirming dance statements of American society in stress and strain. In this role, their dance reminded me of Indian ceremonial dances which invigorate the tribe in drought and difficulty.”

Morgan conceived of her 1941 book project Martha Graham: Sixteen Dances in Photographs- the year she met Graham. From 1935 through the 1945 she photographed more than 40 established dancers and choreographers, and she described her process:

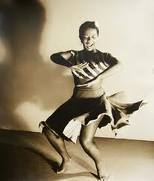
Pearl Primus, Rock Daniel (1944)

“To epitomize…a dance with camera, stage performances are inadequate, because in that situation one can only fortuitously record. For my interpretation it was necessary to redirect, relight, and photographically synthesize what I felt to be the core of the total dance.”

Many of the dancers Morgan photographed are now regarded as the pioneers of modern dance, and her photographs the definitive images of their art. These included Valerie Bettis, Merce Cunningham, Jane Dudley, Erick Hawkins, Hanya Holm, Doris Humphrey, José Limón, Sophie Maslow, May O'Donnell, Pearl Primus, Anna Sokolow, Helen Tamiris, and Charles Weidman. Critics Clive Barnes, John Martin, Elizabeth McCausland, and Beaumont Newhall have all noted the importance of Morgan's work.

Graham and Morgan developed a relationship that would last some 60 years. Their correspondence attests to their mutual affection, trust and respect. In 1980, Graham stated:

“It is rare that even an inspired photographer possesses the demonic eye which can capture the instant of dance and transform it into timeless gesture. In Barbara Morgan I found that person. In looking at these photographs today, I feel, as I felt when I first saw them, privileged to have been a part of this collaboration. For to me, Barbara Morgan through her art reveals the inner landscape that is a dancer's world.”

In 1945, with sponsorship by the National Gallery and the State Department, Morgan mounted the exhibition La Danza Moderna Norte-Americana: Fotografias por Barbara Morgan – 44 panel mounted enlargements, exhibited first at the Museum of Modern Art, New York City, then for a South American tour.

=== Photomontage and light drawing ===
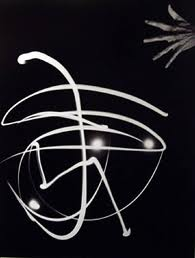
Pure Energy and Neurotic Man (1940)

In her continuing quest to do more with photography, Morgan considered the pervasive, vibratory character of light energy as a partner of the physical and spiritual energy of the dance, and as the prime mover of the photographic process. “Suddenly, I decided to pay my respects to light, and create a rhythmical light design for the book tailpiece.” She created gestural light drawings with an open shuttered camera in her darkened studio.

Although photomontage was enthusiastically practiced in Europe and Latin America in the 1930s and 40s, it was still alien to American photography and widely disparaged. Morgan's knowledge of the European avant-garde, and her friendship with Lucia and László Moholy-Nagy, furthered her interest in montage. She was particularly struck by how the genre could capture the multiplicity of modern American life. She worked with themes of social concern and natural and constructed environments.

=== Summer's Children and book design work ===
Over the years her great interest in children's growth inspired many jobs located at children's camps, schools and colleges, and her own projects, which culminated in the book, Summer's Children (1951). Beaumont Newhall, of George Eastman House praised the work stating, “Her sensitive photographs, skillfully combined with words, capture the world of youth with heartiness and tenderness, humor and sympathy. Summer's Children is a moving interpretation of the magic world of youth.”

Morgan also designed and photo-edited The World of Albert Schweitzer, by Erica Anderson (Harper & Brothers, 1955), and made the photographs for Prestini's Art in Wood, for Pocohontas Press in 1950.

=== Black Mountain College ===
In 1943 at the request of Josef Albers, Barbara Morgan sent 24 photographs for an exhibition at Black Mountain College to accompany a lecture he was presenting on photography. The next year, Morgan joined the faculty of Art Summer Institute for a week during its inaugural year (1944) with Walter Gropius and Josef and Anni Albers, among others. During this session, Morgan lectured to the entire campus community on "the role of Light in Photography." She did not teach a darkroom class, but rather used an outdoor workshop and placed emphasis on aesthetics over technique.

=== Contributions ===
Morgan's life and art were both infused with a sense of energy and purposefulness. “I'm not just a 'photographer' or a 'painter,'” she asserted, “but a visually aware human being searching out ways to communicate the intensities of life.” She possessed an innate capacity for close associations and lasting friendships with some of the most creative minds of her time, exchanging letters with Edward Weston, Gordon Parks, Margaret Mead, Buckminster Fuller, Joseph Campbell, William Carlos Williams, Dorothea Lange, Stuart Davis, Richard Neutra, and Charles Sheeler, among many others. She was a deep and trusted friend of Berenice Abbott, Wynn Bullock, Minor White, Ansel Adams, and Nancy and Beaumont Newhall. In 1952, Morgan founded Aperture Magazine with Adams, Lange, White and the Newhalls. Her work was included by Edward Steichen in MoMA's world-touring The Family of Man, which she reviewed for an issue of Aperture devoted to the show. Morgan exhibited widely, including a second solo show at Museum of Modern Art, New York, and lectured nationally for nearly five decades. She was a guest instructor for the Ansel Adams Yosemite Workshops in 1970 and 1971. Her numerous articles in journals, her commentaries on art and photography, and her voluminous, lively correspondence have yet to be studied in depth. Morgan's archive, along with her husband Willard's, is part of the UCLA Library Special Collections, Charles E. Young Research Library, University of California. “How wonderful to behold a person who has developed all of these capacities because of her practice of living as a whole being,” Minor White wrote in the introduction to a 1964 issue of Aperture dedicated to her work.

She subsequently resumed work in drawing, watercolor, and painting as well, which continued through the 1970s.

== Published works ==
- Martha Graham: Sixteen Dances in Photographs (First Edition 1941, Duell, Sloan and Pearce)
- Summer's Children (First Edition 1951, Morgan and Morgan)
- Barbara Morgan- A Morgan & Morgan Monograph (1972)
- Barbara Morgan: Photomontage (1980, Morgan and Morgan)

== Awards and recognition ==
- Lifetime Achievement Award of American Society of Magazine Photographers
- Women's Caucus for Art Lifetime Achievement Award (1986)
- Honorary Doctorate of Fine Arts degree From Marquette University, Milwaukee, Wisconsin in 1978
