= 2018 Roseanne 300 =

Fifth race of the 2018 NASCAR Xfinity Series

Race details
- Race 5 of 33 of the 2018 NASCAR Xfinity Series
- Date: March 17, 2018
- Official name: Roseanne 300
- Location: Fontana, California, Auto Club Speedway
- Course: Permanent racing facility
- Course length: 2 miles (3.2 km)
- Distance: 150 laps, 300 mi (482.803 km)
- Scheduled distance: 150 laps, 300 mi (482.803 km)
- Average speed: 127.283 miles per hour (204.842 km/h)

Pole position
Driver	Christopher Bell	Joe Gibbs Racing
- Time: 39.766

Most laps led
Driver	Joey Logano	Team Penske
- Laps: 139

Winner
No. 22	Joey Logano	Team Penske

Television in the United States
- Network: Fox Sports 1
- Announcers: Adam Alexander, Michael Waltrip, Brad Keselowski

Radio in the United States
- Radio: Motor Racing Network

The 2018 Roseanne 300 was the 5th stock car race of the 2018 NASCAR Xfinity Series season, and the 20th iteration of the event. The race was held on Saturday, March 17, 2018, in Fontana, California, at Auto Club Speedway, a 2 miles (3.2 km) permanent D-shaped oval racetrack. The race took the scheduled 150 laps to complete. At race's end, Joey Logano of Team Penske would dominate and win his 29th NASCAR Xfinity Series win of his career and the first of his part-time season. To fill out the podium, Justin Allgaier and Elliott Sadler, both driving for JR Motorsports would finish second and third, respectively.

== Background ==
The layout of Auto Club Speedway, the venue where the race was held.

Auto Club Speedway (previously California Speedway) was a two-mile (3.2 km), low-banked, D-shaped oval superspeedway in Fontana, California which hosted NASCAR racing annually from 1997 to 2023. It was also used for open wheel racing events. The racetrack was located near the former locations of Ontario Motor Speedway and Riverside International Raceway. The track was owned and operated by International Speedway Corporation and was the only track owned by ISC to have its naming rights sold. The speedway was served by the nearby Interstate 10 and Interstate 15 freeways as well as a Metrolink station located behind the backstretch.

=== Entry list ===
#	Driver	Team	Make	Sponsor
0	Garrett Smithley	JD Motorsports	Chevrolet	VehicleKeys.com
00	Cole Custer	Stewart-Haas Racing with Biagi-DenBeste	Ford	Haas CNC
1	Elliott Sadler	JR Motorsports	Chevrolet	Beechcraft, Cessna
01	Vinnie Miller	JD Motorsports	Chevrolet	JAS Expedited Trucking
2	Matt Tifft	Richard Childress Racing	Chevrolet	Anderson's Maple Syrup
3	Austin Dillon	Richard Childress Racing	Chevrolet	Prudential Overall Supply, Red Kap
4	Ross Chastain	JD Motorsports	Chevrolet	Future Media Sales, Daley Technology Systems
5	Michael Annett	JR Motorsports	Chevrolet	Pilot Flying J
7	Justin Allgaier	JR Motorsports	Chevrolet	Hellmann's
8	Tommy Joe Martins	B. J. McLeod Motorsports	Chevrolet	B. J. McLeod Motorsports
9	Tyler Reddick	JR Motorsports	Chevrolet	Nationwide Children's Hospital
11	Ryan Truex	Kaulig Racing	Chevrolet	Bar Harbor
15	Matt Mills	JD Motorsports	Chevrolet	Flex Glue
16	Ryan Reed	Roush Fenway Racing	Ford	DriveDownA1C.com
18	Ryan Preece	Joe Gibbs Racing	Toyota	Rheem
19	Brandon Jones	Joe Gibbs Racing	Toyota	Menards, Jeld-Wen
20	Christopher Bell	Joe Gibbs Racing	Toyota	GameStop, Turtle Beach
21	Daniel Hemric	Richard Childress Racing	Chevrolet	South Point Hotel, Casino & Spa
22	Joey Logano	Team Penske	Ford	Discount Tire, America's Tire
23	Spencer Gallagher	GMS Racing	Chevrolet	Allegiant Air
24	Kaz Grala	JGL Racing	Ford	Nettts
28	Dylan Lupton	JGL Racing	Ford	ThinQ Technology Partners
35	Joey Gase	Go Green Racing with SS-Green Light Racing	Chevrolet	Sparks Energy
36	Alex Labbé	DGM Racing	Chevrolet	Wholey's, Can-Am
38	J. J. Yeley	RSS Racing	Chevrolet	RSS Racing
39	Ryan Sieg	RSS Racing	Chevrolet	Lombard Bros Gaming
40	Chad Finchum	MBM Motorsports	Toyota	"TLC" Resorts Vacation Club, Smithbilt Homes
42	John Hunter Nemechek	Chip Ganassi Racing	Chevrolet	Fire Alarm Services
45	Josh Bilicki	JP Motorsports	Toyota	Prevagen
51	Jeremy Clements	Jeremy Clements Racing	Chevrolet	RepairableVehicles.com
52	David Starr	Jimmy Means Racing	Chevrolet	Striping Technology, Chasco
55	Stephen Leicht	JP Motorsports	Toyota	Jani-King "The King of Clean"
60	Austin Cindric	Roush Fenway Racing	Ford	LTi Printing
66	Timmy Hill	MBM Motorsports	Dodge	CrashClaimsR.Us, Chris Kyle Memorial Benefit
74	Mike Harmon	Mike Harmon Racing	Chevrolet	Shadow Warriors Project
76	Spencer Boyd	SS-Green Light Racing	Chevrolet	Grunt Style "This We'll Defend"
78	B. J. McLeod	B. J. McLeod Motorsports	Chevrolet	JW Transport
89	Morgan Shepherd	Shepherd Racing Ventures	Chevrolet	Visone RV Motorhome Parts, Racing with Jesus
90	Josh Williams	DGM Racing	Chevrolet	Scott Foundation, Phoenix Children's Hospital
93	Jeff Green	RSS Racing	Chevrolet	RSS Racing
Official entry list

== Practice ==
=== First practice ===
First practice was held on Friday, March 16 at 12:35 PM PST. Christopher Bell of Joe Gibbs Racing would set the fastest lap with a lap of 40.299 and an average speed of 178.664 miles per hour (287.532 km/h).

Pos.	#	Driver	Team	Make	Time	Speed
1	20	Christopher Bell	Joe Gibbs Racing	Toyota	40.299	178.664
2	22	Joey Logano	Team Penske	Ford	40.431	178.081
3	3	Austin Dillon	Richard Childress Racing	Chevrolet	40.435	178.064
Full first practice results

=== Second and final practice ===
The second and final practice was held on Friday, 2:35 PM PST. Daniel Hemric of Richard Childress Racing would set the fastest lap with a lap of 40.262 and an average speed of 178.829 miles per hour (287.797 km/h).

Pos.	#	Driver	Team	Make	Time	Speed
1	21	Daniel Hemric	Richard Childress Racing	Chevrolet	40.262	178.829
2	22	Joey Logano	Team Penske	Ford	40.385	178.284
3	42	John Hunter Nemechek	Chip Ganassi Racing	Chevrolet	40.391	178.258
Full final practice results

== Qualifying ==
Qualifying would take place on Saturday, March 17 at 10:35 AM PST. Since Auto Club Speedway is at least 2 miles (3.2 km), the qualifying system was a single car, single lap, two round system where in the first round, everyone would set a time to determine positions 13-40. Then, the fastest 12 qualifiers would move on to the second round to determine positions 1-12.

Christopher Bell of Joe Gibbs Racing would advance from the first round and win the pole by setting the fastest time in Round 2, with a lap of 39.766 and an average speed of 181.059 miles per hour (291.386 km/h).

No drivers would fail to qualify.

=== Full qualifying results ===
Pos.	#	Driver	Team	Make	Time (R1)	Speed (R1)	Time (R2)	Speed (R2)
1	20	Christopher Bell	Joe Gibbs Racing	Toyota	39.745	181.155	39.766	181.059
2	22	Joey Logano	Team Penske	Ford	39.665	181.520	39.796	180.923
3	42	John Hunter Nemechek	Chip Ganassi Racing	Chevrolet	40.031	179.861	40.001	179.996
4	00	Cole Custer	Stewart-Haas Racing with Biagi-DenBeste	Ford	39.900	180.451	40.015	179.933
5	21	Daniel Hemric	Richard Childress Racing	Chevrolet	39.784	180.977	40.027	179.879
6	7	Justin Allgaier	JR Motorsports	Chevrolet	39.956	180.198	40.079	179.645
7	16	Ryan Reed	Roush Fenway Racing	Ford	39.944	180.252	40.083	179.627
8	18	Ryan Preece	Joe Gibbs Racing	Toyota	40.198	179.113	40.088	179.605
9	19	Brandon Jones	Joe Gibbs Racing	Toyota	40.191	179.145	40.163	179.269
10	11	Ryan Truex	Kaulig Racing	Chevrolet	40.143	179.359	40.615	177.274
11	1	Elliott Sadler	JR Motorsports	Chevrolet	40.047	179.789	40.627	177.222
12	24	Kaz Grala	JGL Racing	Ford	40.241	178.922	40.734	176.757
Eliminated in Round 1
13	4	Ross Chastain	JD Motorsports	Chevrolet	40.244	178.909	—	—
14	60	Austin Cindric	Roush Fenway Racing	Ford	40.291	178.700	—	—
15	23	Spencer Gallagher	GMS Racing	Chevrolet	40.409	178.178	—	—
16	9	Tyler Reddick	JR Motorsports	Chevrolet	40.480	177.866	—	—
17	39	Ryan Sieg	RSS Racing	Chevrolet	40.496	177.795	—	—
18	5	Michael Annett	JR Motorsports	Chevrolet	40.574	177.454	—	—
19	3	Austin Dillon	Richard Childress Racing	Chevrolet	40.625	177.231	—	—
20	2	Matt Tifft	Richard Childress Racing	Chevrolet	40.631	177.205	—	—
21	36	Alex Labbé	DGM Racing	Chevrolet	40.899	176.043	—	—
22	51	Jeremy Clements	Jeremy Clements Racing	Chevrolet	40.929	175.914	—	—
23	35	Joey Gase	Go Green Racing with SS-Green Light Racing	Chevrolet	41.081	175.264	—	—
24	38	J. J. Yeley	RSS Racing	Chevrolet	41.100	175.182	—	—
25	0	Garrett Smithley	JD Motorsports	Chevrolet	41.162	174.919	—	—
26	78	B. J. McLeod	B. J. McLeod Motorsports	Chevrolet	41.188	174.808	—	—
27	90	Josh Williams	DGM Racing	Chevrolet	41.656	172.844	—	—
28	40	Chad Finchum	MBM Motorsports	Toyota	41.745	172.476	—	—
29	76	Spencer Boyd	SS-Green Light Racing	Chevrolet	41.751	172.451	—	—
30	15	Matt Mills	JD Motorsports	Chevrolet	41.812	172.199	—	—
31	8	Tommy Joe Martins	B. J. McLeod Motorsports	Chevrolet	41.882	171.912	—	—
32	93	Jeff Green	RSS Racing	Chevrolet	42.476	169.507	—	—
33	89	Morgan Shepherd	Shepherd Racing Ventures	Chevrolet	42.808	168.193	—	—
Qualified by owner's points
34	01	Vinnie Miller	JD Motorsports	Chevrolet	42.868	167.957	—	—
35	66	Timmy Hill	MBM Motorsports	Dodge	43.069	167.174	—	—
36	52	David Starr	Jimmy Means Racing	Chevrolet	43.232	166.543	—	—
37	55	Stephen Leicht	JP Motorsports	Toyota	43.328	166.174	—	—
38	45	Josh Bilicki	JP Motorsports	Toyota	43.868	164.129	—	—
39	74	Mike Harmon	Mike Harmon Racing	Chevrolet	43.972	163.741	—	—
40	28	Dylan Lupton	JGL Racing	Ford	—	—	—	—
Official qualifying results
Official starting lineup

== Race results ==
Stage 1 Laps: 35

Fin	#	Driver	Team	Make	Pts
1	22	Joey Logano	Team Penske	Ford	0
2	7	Justin Allgaier	JR Motorsports	Chevrolet	9
3	00	Cole Custer	Stewart-Haas Racing with Biagi-DenBeste	Ford	8
4	1	Elliott Sadler	JR Motorsports	Chevrolet	7
5	9	Tyler Reddick	JR Motorsports	Chevrolet	6
6	20	Christopher Bell	Joe Gibbs Racing	Toyota	5
7	42	John Hunter Nemechek	Chip Ganassi Racing	Chevrolet	4
8	21	Daniel Hemric	Richard Childress Racing	Chevrolet	3
9	4	Ross Chastain	JD Motorsports	Chevrolet	2
10	11	Ryan Truex	Kaulig Racing	Chevrolet	1

Stage 2 Laps: 35

Fin	#	Driver	Team	Make	Pts
1	22	Joey Logano	Team Penske	Ford	0
2	9	Tyler Reddick	JR Motorsports	Chevrolet	9
3	20	Christopher Bell	Joe Gibbs Racing	Toyota	8
4	1	Elliott Sadler	JR Motorsports	Chevrolet	7
5	7	Justin Allgaier	JR Motorsports	Chevrolet	6
6	00	Cole Custer	Stewart-Haas Racing with Biagi-DenBeste	Ford	5
7	21	Daniel Hemric	Richard Childress Racing	Chevrolet	4
8	3	Austin Dillon	Richard Childress Racing	Chevrolet	0
9	18	Ryan Preece	Joe Gibbs Racing	Toyota	2
10	5	Michael Annett	JR Motorsports	Chevrolet	1

Stage 3 Laps: 80

Fin	St	#	Driver	Team	Make	Laps	Led	Status	Pts
1	2	22	Joey Logano	Team Penske	Ford	150	139	running	0
2	6	7	Justin Allgaier	JR Motorsports	Chevrolet	150	2	running	50
3	11	1	Elliott Sadler	JR Motorsports	Chevrolet	150	4	running	48
4	19	3	Austin Dillon	Richard Childress Racing	Chevrolet	150	0	running	0
5	5	21	Daniel Hemric	Richard Childress Racing	Chevrolet	150	0	running	39
6	4	00	Cole Custer	Stewart-Haas Racing with Biagi-DenBeste	Ford	150	0	running	44
7	16	9	Tyler Reddick	JR Motorsports	Chevrolet	150	0	running	45
8	20	2	Matt Tifft	Richard Childress Racing	Chevrolet	150	0	running	29
9	8	18	Ryan Preece	Joe Gibbs Racing	Toyota	150	0	running	30
10	13	4	Ross Chastain	JD Motorsports	Chevrolet	150	0	running	29
11	15	23	Spencer Gallagher	GMS Racing	Chevrolet	150	0	running	26
12	10	11	Ryan Truex	Kaulig Racing	Chevrolet	150	0	running	26
13	9	19	Brandon Jones	Joe Gibbs Racing	Toyota	150	0	running	24
14	12	24	Kaz Grala	JGL Racing	Ford	150	0	running	23
15	22	51	Jeremy Clements	Jeremy Clements Racing	Chevrolet	150	0	running	22
16	23	35	Joey Gase	Go Green Racing with SS-Green Light Racing	Chevrolet	150	0	running	21
17	7	16	Ryan Reed	Roush Fenway Racing	Ford	150	0	running	20
18	18	5	Michael Annett	JR Motorsports	Chevrolet	150	0	running	20
19	21	36	Alex Labbé	DGM Racing	Chevrolet	150	0	running	18
20	17	39	Ryan Sieg	RSS Racing	Chevrolet	150	1	running	17
21	1	20	Christopher Bell	Joe Gibbs Racing	Toyota	150	4	running	29
22	26	78	B. J. McLeod	B. J. McLeod Motorsports	Chevrolet	150	0	running	15
23	25	0	Garrett Smithley	JD Motorsports	Chevrolet	149	0	running	14
24	31	8	Tommy Joe Martins	B. J. McLeod Motorsports	Chevrolet	149	0	running	13
25	27	90	Josh Williams	DGM Racing	Chevrolet	148	0	running	12
26	36	52	David Starr	Jimmy Means Racing	Chevrolet	148	0	running	11
27	34	01	Vinnie Miller	JD Motorsports	Chevrolet	148	0	running	10
28	14	60	Austin Cindric	Roush Fenway Racing	Ford	147	0	running	9
29	3	42	John Hunter Nemechek	Chip Ganassi Racing	Chevrolet	147	0	running	12
30	29	76	Spencer Boyd	SS-Green Light Racing	Chevrolet	147	0	running	7
31	37	55	Stephen Leicht	JP Motorsports	Toyota	132	0	brakes	6
32	38	45	Josh Bilicki	JP Motorsports	Toyota	122	0	engine	5
33	40	28	Dylan Lupton	JGL Racing	Ford	109	0	engine	4
34	24	38	J. J. Yeley	RSS Racing	Chevrolet	76	0	power steering	3
35	35	66	Timmy Hill	MBM Motorsports	Dodge	56	0	vibration	2
36	28	40	Chad Finchum	MBM Motorsports	Toyota	45	0	engine	1
37	30	15	Matt Mills	JD Motorsports	Chevrolet	29	0	crash	1
38	33	89	Morgan Shepherd	Shepherd Racing Ventures	Chevrolet	22	0	suspension	1
39	32	93	Jeff Green	RSS Racing	Chevrolet	10	0	brakes	1
40	39	74	Mike Harmon	Mike Harmon Racing	Chevrolet	6	0	engine	1
Official race results

Previous race: 2018 DC Solar 200	NASCAR Xfinity Series; 2018 season	Next race: 2018 My Bariatric Solutions 300
