= Lovell Beach House =

Historic house in California, United States

- U.S. National Register of Historic Places
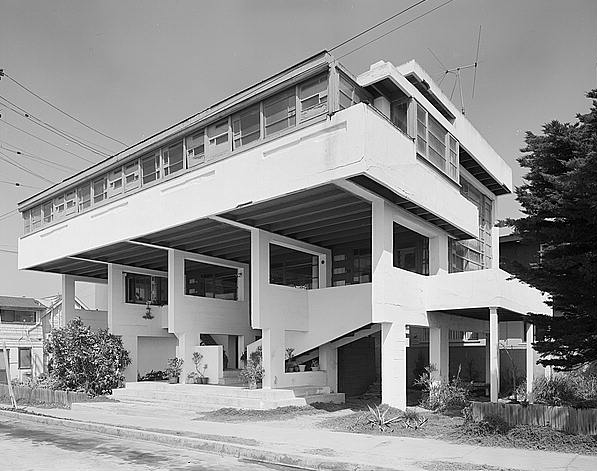
- The Lovell Beach House
- Location: 1242 West Oceanfront, Newport Beach, CA
- Coordinates: 33°36′21.23″N 117°55′03.59″W
- Built: 1926
- Architect: Rudolf Schindler
- Architectural style: Modern
- NRHP reference No.: 74000545
- Added to NRHP: February 5, 1974

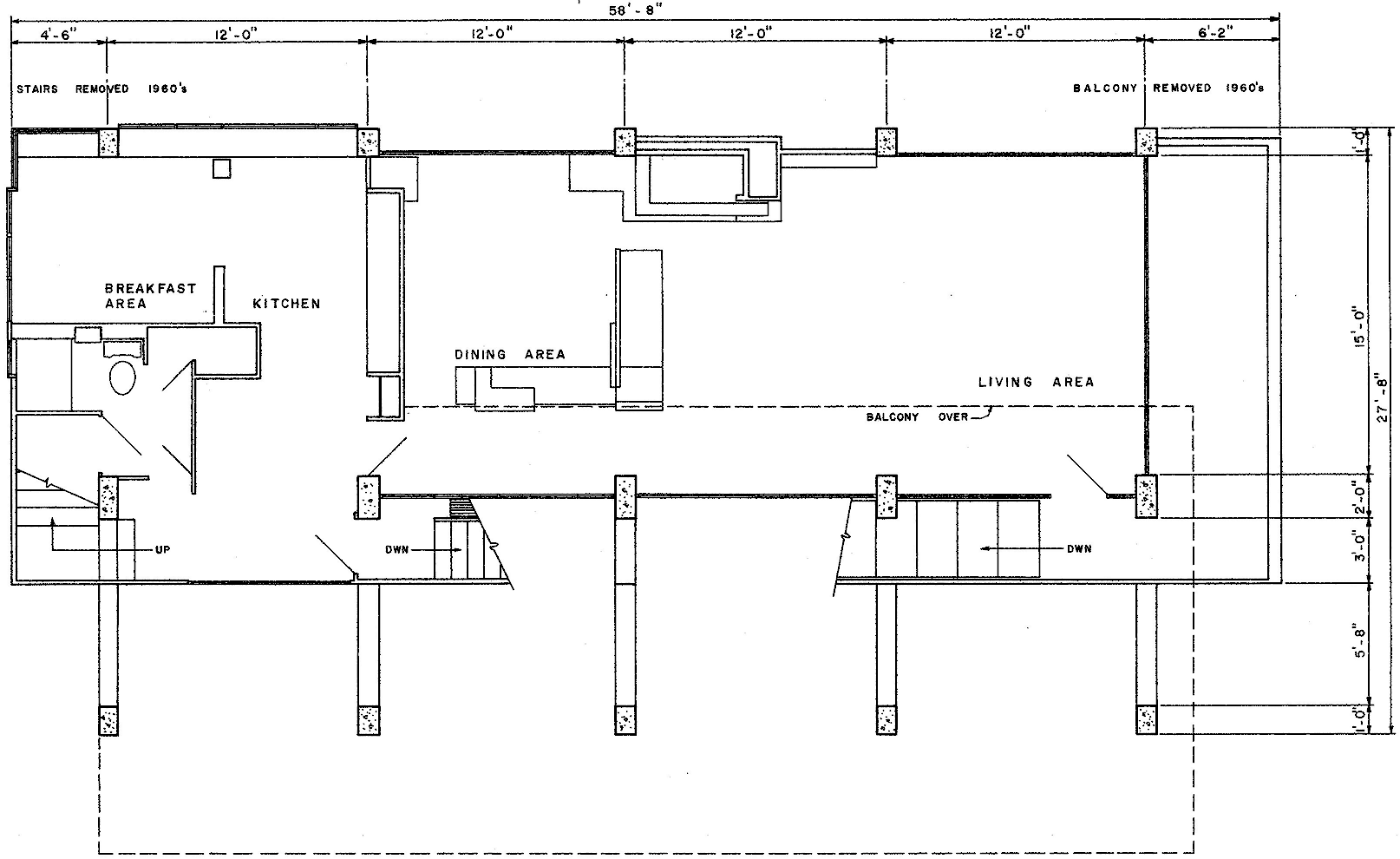
First floor plan (north is on the left)

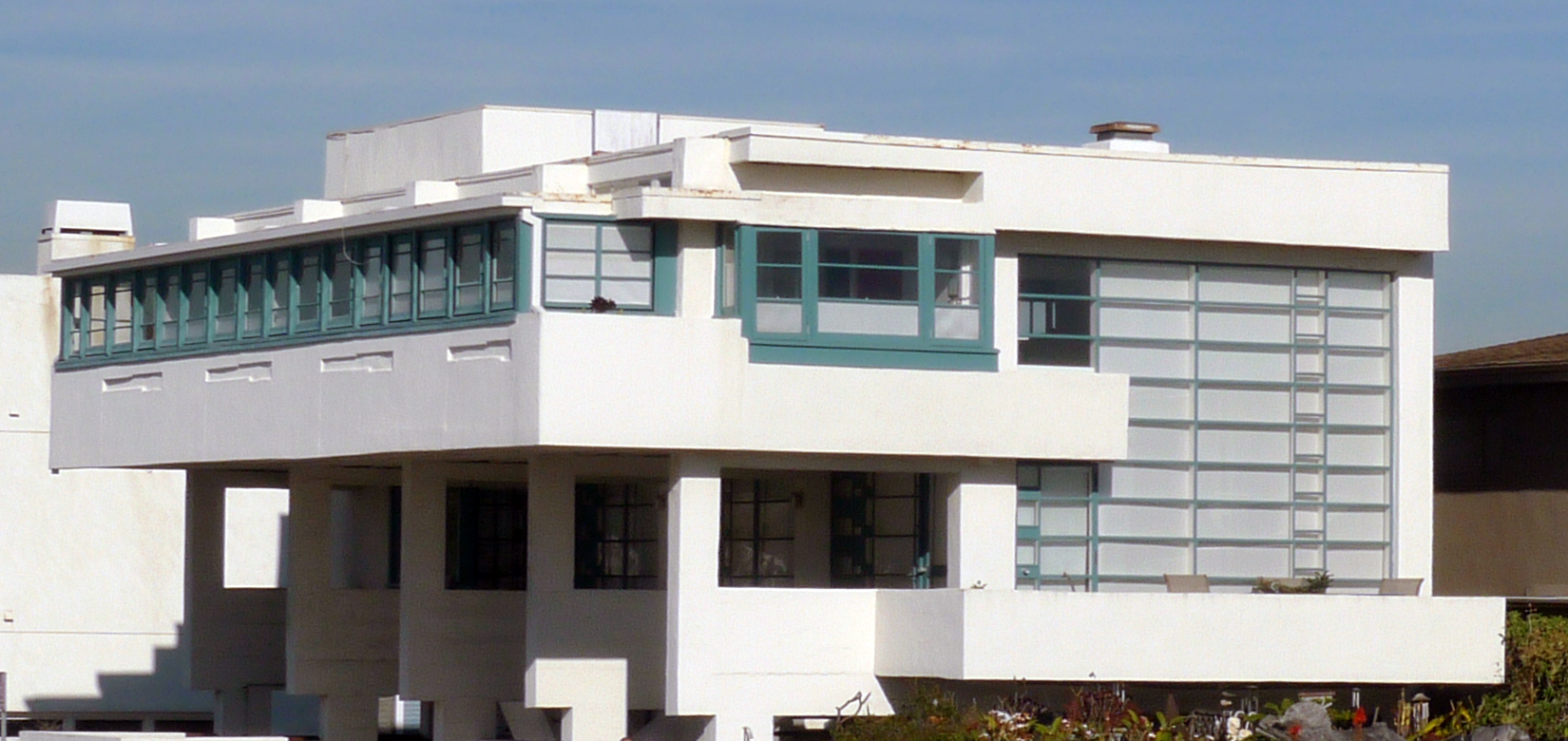
Lovell Beach House December 2013

The Lovell Beach House is located on the Balboa Peninsula in Newport Beach, California. The building was completed in 1926 and is now recognized as one of the most important works by architect Rudolf Schindler, second only to the Schindler House, built four years earlier for his family as a show house and studio. Both of these early houses by Schindler are considered landmarks of early modern architecture in America.

The residence is on the ocean front, not far from The Wedge at Newport Harbor, in a tightly packed neighborhood of buildings. The house is sheltered from the street on the west side by raising the living quarters above the ground level. The open space below reveals the reinforced concrete frames that were formed in the shape of a figure 8. Two stairways pass through the openings in the frames leading to the kitchen and the main entry. The garage is on the north side of the ground floor and the garden is on the south side, between the house and the beach.

The interior is arranged around a two-story living/dining room, with full height, curtain wall windows on the east and south side facing the ocean. The kitchen and breakfast area are located on the north side of the first floor, with a terrace on the ocean side over the garden. Lamps and built-in furniture were provided as part of the original design. Bedrooms on the second floor are connected by a corridor overlooking the main living room. Each of the bedrooms originally had access to an open sleeping porch, but these were enclosed by Schindler in 1928.

== Context ==
The client for the project, Philip M. Lovell, was inspired by a style of healthy living, with guidelines for proper diet and exercise. Schindler also adopted these principles and addressed these concerns in the design of the beach house. The arrangement of the living quarters on the north side of the house maximizes the circulation of fresh air. Each bedroom is furnished with windows for cross ventilation to eliminate the need for air conditioning. The Lovell family continue to own the house.

Lovell also commissioned another house in Los Angeles. The Lovell "Health House" was completed in 1929 on Dundee Drive in Los Angeles, three years after the Beach House was finished. This commission was awarded to Richard Neutra, who was living with his wife in a part of Schindler's House and studio between 1926 and 1930. These two architects created houses that became classic forms of the new California residential design, and icons of the Modern movement in America.

== Historic significance ==
The Los Angeles branch of the Historic American Buildings Survey (HABS) documented the house in 1968. The house today has much the same appearance as the photographs taken during the survey. The significance of the house was already apparent at the time:

The Lovell Beach House is generally considered one of the greatest works of pioneering modern architect, R. M. Schindler. It demonstrates an early use of concrete which predates and predicts the post-war Brutalist style, in which concrete is left unsurfaced, and structure is distinct from enclosure. ... The house is lifted above its beach site and cradled in five concrete frames in the shape of figure 8's. These were poured in place. The enclosed areas were shop-fabricated and hoisted into position. The play of forms in the advancing and receding planes are related to the De Stijl movement begun in the Netherlands in 1917.

The Beach House was listed as a Registered Historic Place in California on February 5, 1974.

== See also ==
- Constructivist architecture
