= Prudential =

Prudential is an adjective referring to prudence and, in a financial context, denotes risk awareness. Specifically, prudential policy refers to public regulation and supervision of financial institutions such as banks and insurance companies. Prudential may also refer to:

== Companies and associated items ==
- Prudential plc, a British multinational insurance company
  - Prudential BSN Takaful, a Malaysian takaful company
  - ICICI Prudential Life Insurance, an Indian company
- Prudential Financial, an American financial products and services company
  - Prudential Securities, former financial services arm of Prudential Financial
- Prudential Bank Limited, a private commercial bank in Ghana
- Prudential Overall Supply, an American laundry and cleanroom company headquartered in Irvine, California, US
- Prudential Steamship Corporation, a defunct American shipping company

== Award ==
- Prudential Spirit of Community Award, established by one of the above companies

== Buildings and structures ==
- Prudential Building (Buffalo, New York), US
- Prudential Assurance Building (disambiguation), two buildings in England
- Prudential Center (disambiguation), several structures in the United States
- Prudential Headquarters, several buildings in Newark, New Jersey, US
- Prudential House, a skyscraper in Warsaw, Poland
- Prudential Tower, a skyscraper in Boston, Massachusetts, US
  - Prudential station, an underground light rail stop
  - Prudential Tunnel, a highway tunnel
- Prudential Tower (Tokyo), a skyscraper in Nagatachō, Tokyo, Japan
- Houston Main Building, formerly the Prudential Building, a demolished skyscraper in Houston, Texas, US

== Sport ==
- Prudential Trophy, a One Day International cricket competition in England 1972–1982
- Prudential World Cup, the name of the first three Cricket World Cups
