= Willard D. Morgan =

American photographer, writer, editor and educator (1900–1967)

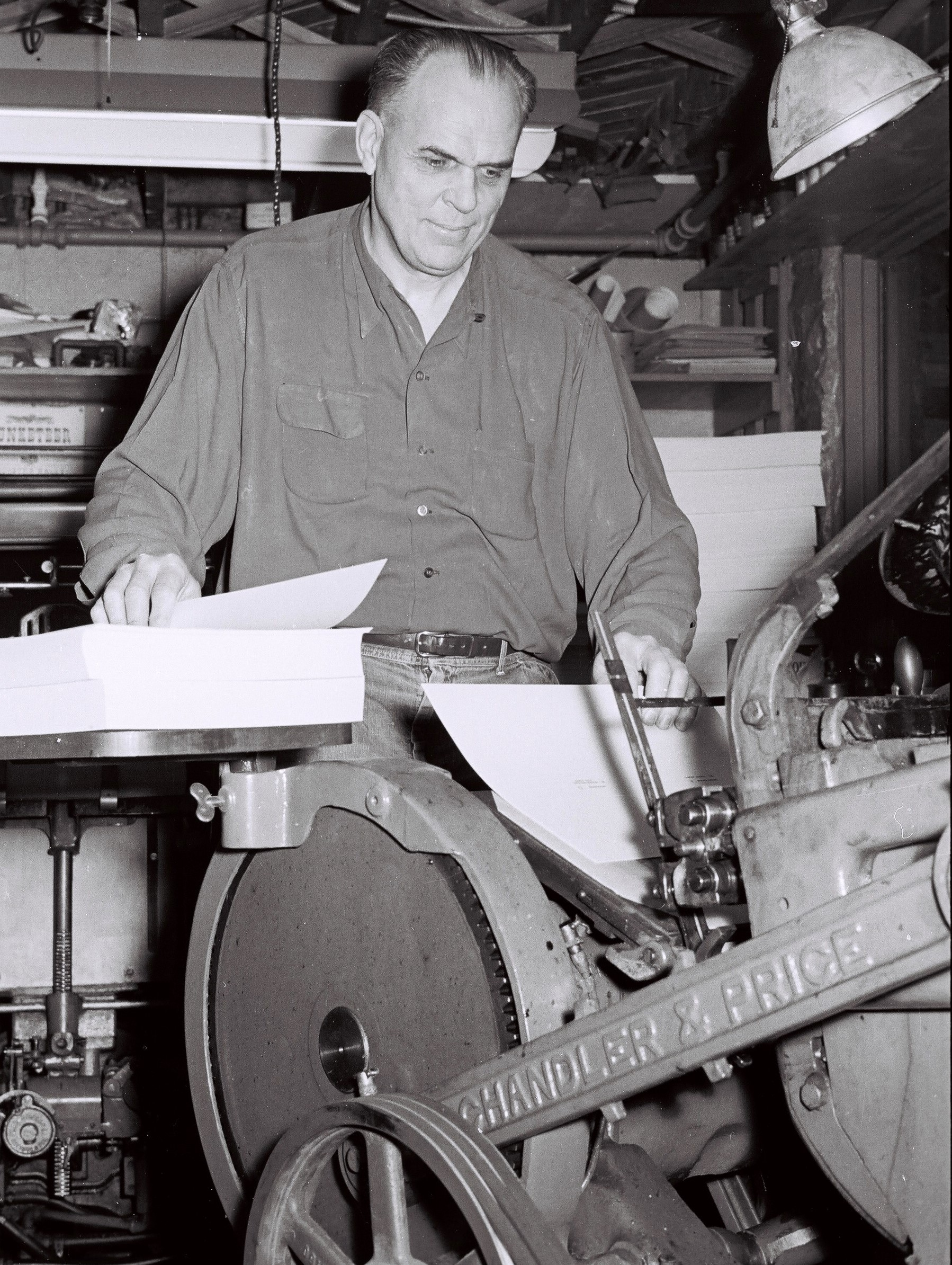
- Morgan working in home print shop, 1950
- Born: Willard Detering Morgan; May 30, 1900; Snohomish, Washington, US
- Died: September 18, 1967 (aged 67); Bronxville, New York, US
- Other name: "Herc" (to his friends)
- Occupations: Photographer, writer, editor
- Notable work: The Leica Manual; The Complete Photographer (magazine); The Encyclopedia of Photography: The Complete Photographer
- Spouse: Barbara Morgan (m. 1925)
- Children: 2

Willard "Herc" Detering Morgan (May 30, 1900 – September 18, 1967) was a photographer, writer, editor, and educator and the husband of photographer Barbara Morgan, known for her documentation of Martha Graham's dances.

Morgan's career spanned some of the most influential developments in the history of American photography. He was instrumental in introducing the first 35mm camera in the US, was an early director of photography at MOMA, and was the first to exhibit the Farm Security Administration photographers. He was also a writer and editor of technical publications on photography (from the Leica Manual, to Ansel Adams' Basic Photo Series, Encyclopedia of Photography, to Encyclopædia Britannica), and was a photo editor at LIFE and later a photo editor at Look.

== Background ==
Willard Morgan was born in Snohomish, Washington, on May 30, 1900, to Morgan and Marie Detering. Known to his friends as Herc, short for Hercules, Morgan was a very large man who stood 6'7" with a corresponding athletic build.

== California ==
As a teenager in Pomona, California, Morgan operated a small press out of his home—writing articles, photographing, and editing small journals for youth groups.

After graduating from Pomona College in 1923 with a degree in English, Morgan earned his living by writing freelance magazine articles and illustrating them with his photographs. He married Barbara Brooks Johnson, a painter on the art faculty of UCLA in 1925. While she helped him with composition, he taught her photography. She would eventually use these lessons to produce photographs of Martha Graham.

Morgan contacted Richard Neutra to discuss the influence of the automobile on architecture. The relationship would last a lifetime, with Willard photographing all aspects of construction of the Lovell house in the 1920s, writing articles about it, and publishing Richard Neutra on Building: Mystery & Realities of the Site in 1951.

== 35mm photography and the Southwest ==
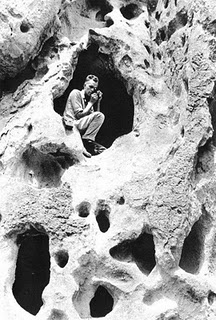
Willard with Leica at Bandelier. Photo by Barbara Morgan 1928, taken with their second 35mm Leica

Morgan first saw the 35mm Leica model A camera in 1928. He wrote to E. Leitz in New York City and proposed trading two Leica cameras and other necessary equipment in exchange for articles that would feature photographs made by the Leica, highlighting the possibilities of its small size.

In 1928, Barbara and Willard Morgan set out to capture the Southwest landscape on film. Morgan used these images to illustrate his articles, becoming the first American photographer to use the 35mm Leica as a professional camera. Morgan was offered a position at E. Leitz, Inc. as a 35mm camera promoter, so the couple moved to New York City in 1930.

In 1931, Morgan lectured throughout the US on the use of the 35mm Leica camera for Leitz. During this time, he also redesigned a Leica projector—originally fit to project large format lantern slides or continuous filmstrips—to accommodate a new 2-by-2-inch (51 mm × 51 mm) slide that would become the standard. He created the Leitz publication Leica Photography in 1932 and continued to publicize the Leica camera. He also patented the FocoSlide, a copying device manufactured by Leitz, which improved the Leica's performance in copy and macro applications by allowing the photographer to view exactly what the lens would see, without parallax. In 1933, Morgan produced and curated the First Annual Leica Photographic Salon, one of the first 35mm exhibitions to be held outside a camera club.

Morgan & Lester (Henry M. Lester) Publishers was founded in 1934, and Leica Manual was the firm's first book, published the next year. Morgan edited the Leica Manual, written and illustrated by specialists in the miniature field. Leica Manual went through 15 editions with over a million copies sold. A Spanish translation of the Leica Manual was printed in 1954.

== Life magazine ==
From the onset of Life magazine in 1936, Morgan worked as the contributions editor for two years. With only four staff photographers, Life originally based the majority of photo-illustrations on reader contributions, and Willard's department solicited and selected those images. He recalls one photographer who came into his office: "Weegee was one that I first found through the contributor department. And I remember he came in there with a pack of pictures under his arm one day and his old worn-out overcoat, and I thought he was a Bowery bum." Edward Weston and Carl Mydans were also selected through Morgan's office – the latter soon becoming a staff photographer.

In 1938, as director of exhibits at Life magazine, Morgan was responsible for the first showing of the Farm Security Administration photographs in the First International Photographic Exposition in New York City. FSA photographers Russell Lee and Arthur Rothstein assembled the photographs. In correspondence with Roy Stryker, Morgan reflects on the reaction to the exhibit:

Turned out that I had plenty of criticism and some violent reactions from the public. The pictorial and Oval Table Society bunch were down on me and wanted to remove the FSA photos as not being worthy of the Show ... Yes, Mr. Bing, the father of the Oval Table Society threatened to pull out of the exhibition because I hung the FSA photos in the next gallery to his pictorial, mostly soft-focus pictures. He could see one of our big enlargements over the partition ... so I smoothed out his feathers by lowering your photo so he couldn't see it from his booth. Even then he kept grumbling about the FSA photos not being worthy of showing.

Edward Steichen wrote an article for U.S. Camera Annual in 1939, commending the show.

== Museum of Modern Art ==
In 1943, the Museum of Modern Art appointed Morgan as the first Director of its photography collections as well as its newly established Photography Center. In the October/November MoMA bulletin introducing the center and its new Director, Willard writes,

Photography has been a natural development of the mechanical age. It is man's way of showing a world image. With such readily expressive medium, anyone can use the camera- for casual snapshots, for commercial gain, or for the photographs which have more than a transitory value ... something possessing greater depth of perception and meaning. It is not my intention to force photography in a narrow or precious direction, but here at the Photography Center to encourage its varied possibilities and affirm its simple honesty. The purpose of the Photography Center is to watch and encourage the best in all photography.

As director, Morgan organized an extensive lecture series. The first lecture, "Standards of Photographic Criticism", a discussion by three critics about the nature and standards of the photo critic's task, was attended by some 250 people. Weegee presented a lecture at the Center entitled "Realism in Photography"; Barbara Morgan spoke on "Imagination in Photography"; and a panel consisting of Charles Sheeler, Hyatt Mayer, Paul Strand, and Ben Shahn discussed "Photography and the Other Arts".

Morgan scheduled Ansel Adams to deliver six public lectures at the Center In 1945, which later became the basis for The Basic Photo Series, which were the first of Adams' publications to include his Zone System principles. In 1948, Morgan began editing and publishing these books these books with Henry Lester, through their publishing house Morgan & Lester.

Morgan established a lantern slide collection for loans to museums, lecturers and school departments, with specific mimeographed notes on "The History of Photography" and "What is Photography."

In the museum proper, Morgan curated the controversial exhibition entitled "The American Snapshot", of which a U.S. Camera review says, "Whether we call them snapshots or some other name, these pictures constitute the most vital, most dynamic, and most interesting and worthwhile photographic exhibition ever assembled by the Museum of Modern Art."

During Morgan's tenure, he actively expanded on MoMA's print collection, adding significant holdings of Farm Security Administration images and scientific photography, which he found revealed new possibilities to artistic photographers through their technical experiments. In a 1964 letter to Barbara Morgan, Nancy Newhall says, "At least it will go on record – something too often forgotten – that Herc was the first Director of Photography at the Museum of Modern Art and helped create the first Center. And whatever mistakes we made, there hasn't yet been a Center that meant so much to photographers."

== Publishing ==
Morgan founded Morgan & Lester Publishers with Henry M. Lester in 1934. The Leica Manual, which Morgan edited, was the firm's first book, published in 1935. Written and illustrated by specialists in the miniature camera field, Leica Manual went through fifteen editions and sold over a million copies. A Spanish translation of the Leica Manual was printed in 1954.

The first Photo-Lab-Index, with quarterly supplements, was published by Morgan & Lester in 1939. The new development of synchronized flash and shutter was first fully explained in Synchroflash Photography, written by Morgan. In 1940, Morgan published and edited the first edition of Graphic Graflex Photography, a technical book on the press camera, which eventually saw its tenth edition in 1954 and was edited by both Morgan and Lester.

From 1941 until 1943, Morgan was the general editor of The Complete Photographer, the ten-volume Encyclopedia of Photography published by the National Educational Alliance. The encyclopedia was published as a magazine and led to The Complete Photographer Quarterly, and eventually to The Encyclopedia of Photography. The Complete Photographer examined photography from both technical and artistic viewpoints. The contributors to the magazine were experts in their fields, and The Complete Photographer serves as a who's-who of photography during the 1940s.

While Morgan & Lester were publishing the 10th Edition of Graphic Graflex Photography, they were also publishing Graflex 22, a manual on the 2 1/4 x 2 1/4 reflex camera written by John S. Carroll. The Stereo Realist Manual was published the following year in 1955. Edited by both Morgan and Lester, the book was the first to contain actual examples of stereo images in both color and black & white. The images could then be experienced with the enclosed optical viewer.

In 1951, Morgan published Richard Neutra on Building: Mystery & Realities of the Site, illustrated with architectural photographs by Julius Shulman. Morgan wrote the photography section of the Encyclopædia Britannica Book of the Year supplements from 1959 until his death in 1967. He was also general editor of the Encyclopedia of Photography, a twenty-volume edition, published by Greystone Press in 1963.

== Type and printing ==
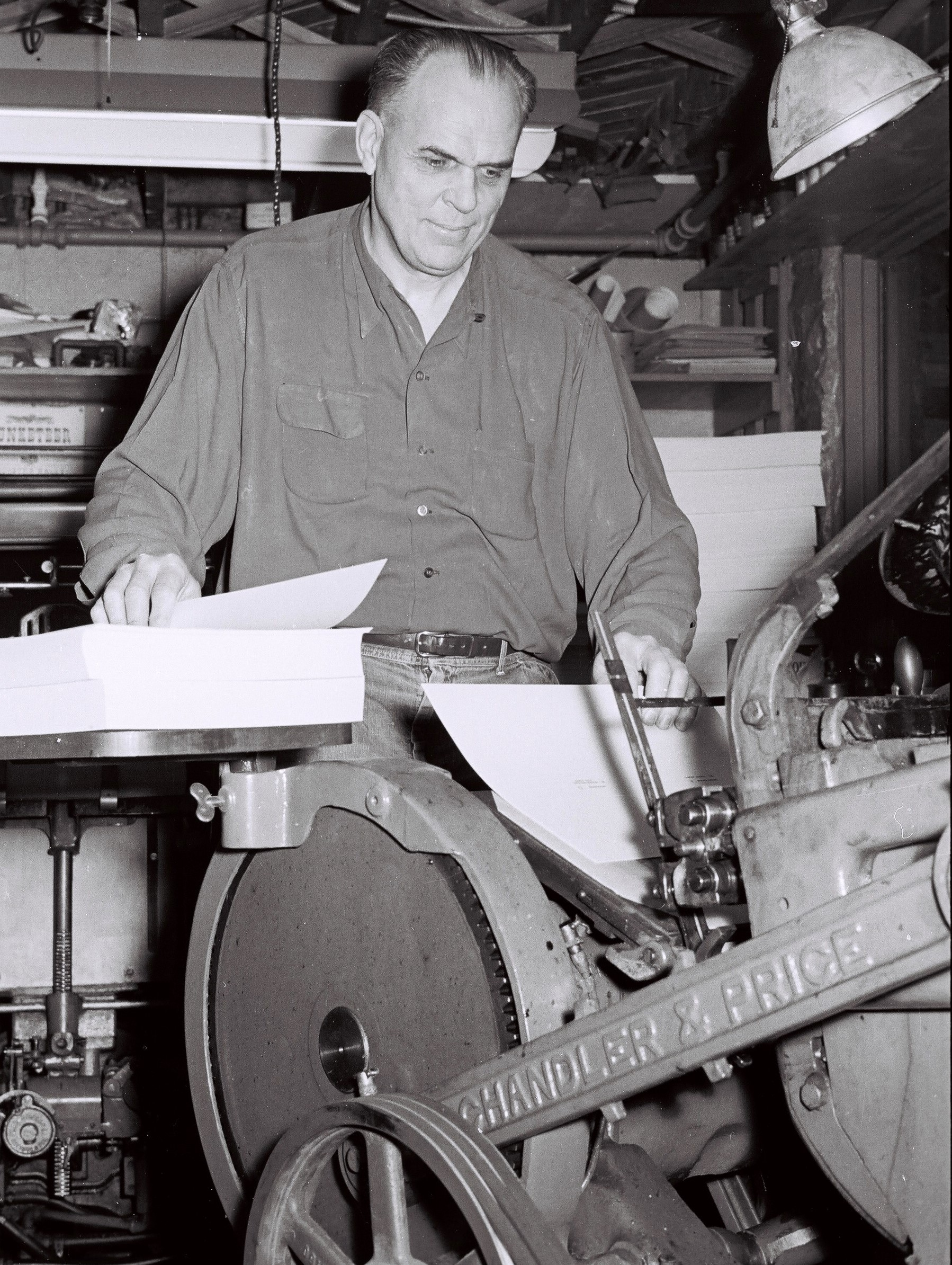
Willard working in his home print shop, 1950

Willard D. Morgan also made significant contributions to the field of printing. A member of the Typophiles Club in New York from 1942 until his death, he was interested not only in publishing on photography but also in fonts and book formats. He collected Americana type fonts of the nineteenth century, contemporary fonts and European type (historical and modern) for 25 years. He studied style and designs of wood and foundry fonts historically, technically and aesthetically. Morgan's collection was perhaps the most comprehensive collection of American typefaces in the US. It is now housed at the Smithsonian National Museum of American History.

== Family and friends ==
Willard and Barbara Morgan had their first child, Douglas Oliver Morgan, on May 7, 1932, while living in Gramercy Park. A second son, Lloyd Brooks Morgan, was born on August 3, 1935. The couple lived at 1 Lexington Avenue until 1941 when they moved into a modern house in Scarsdale, New York, designed by Swiss architect John Weber, with a photographic studio and darkroom for Barbara, a study for Willard, space for a print shop and museum, and a barn, chicken coop and rabbit house. Morgan maintained relationships with Beaumont and Nancy Newhall, Ansel Adams, Margaret Bourke-White, Berenice Abbott, Albert Boni, Julien Bryan and many others in the fields of photography and publishing. He died in 1967 at Lawrence Hospital in Bronxville, New York.

== Published works ==
Numerous published works, including Leica Manual - To be added
