= Prudential Center (disambiguation) =

The Prudential Center is a sports and entertainment arena in Newark, New Jersey, United States

Prudential Center may also refer to:

- Prudential Center (Boston), a shopping and office complex in Boston, Massachusetts, United States

Other similarly named buildings include:

- Prudential Tower, Boston, Massachusetts, United States
- One Prudential Plaza, Chicago, Illinois, United States
- Two Prudential Plaza, Chicago, Illinois, United States
- Prudential Headquarters, the headquarters of Prudential Financial in Newark, New Jersey, United States
- Prudential Plaza, the former name of the Eight Forty One building in Jacksonville, Florida
- Two Prudential Plaza (Jacksonville), Jacksonville, Florida, United States

== For other uses see ==
- Prudential (disambiguation)
