= Philip M. Lovell =

American naturopath

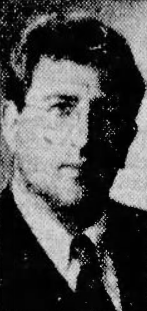
- Born: Morris Saperstein; 2 May 1895; New York City
- Died: 6 September 1978 (aged 83); Hemet, California
- Occupation: Naturopath
- Spouse: Leah Press (m. 1923)

Philip M. Lovell (2 May 1895 – 6 September 1978) was an American naturopath and architectural patron best known for Lovell House and Lovell Beach House. He campaigned for natural foods, sunbathing and a vegetarian diet but was staunchly opposed to the use of medicines.

== Career ==
Lovell was born Morris Saperstein in New York City. In the early 1920s, he quit is job in insurance and left New York to study at the American School of Osteopathy where he earned a degree. Saperstein moved to Los Angeles and reinvented himself as Philip M. Lovell. He took up naturopathy and opened a "drugless practitioner" business in Downtown Los Angeles in 1924.

He worked as a naturopath and one of his first clients was Harry Chandler, publisher of the Los Angeles Times. Chandler was impressed by Lovell and he gave him his own health column "Care of the Body" for the Los Angeles Times. The column was published for over twenty years. Lovell joined the California Avocado Association and proclaimed the avocado "a food concentrate much more sustainable than meat".

Lovell requested his readers to build homes that enabled them to live healthier lives. In 1927, Lovell commissioned Richard Neutra to design a special home for him known as Lovell House. The project was completed in 1929. He invited 5000 of his readers from Los Angeles to visit the house. The property included many unique features such as bedrooms with "porches so that sleeping can be done outdoors" and indirect interior lighting for reading at night. Lovell stated that the house had "a greater profusion of [windows] than in any home I have ever seen".

== Views ==
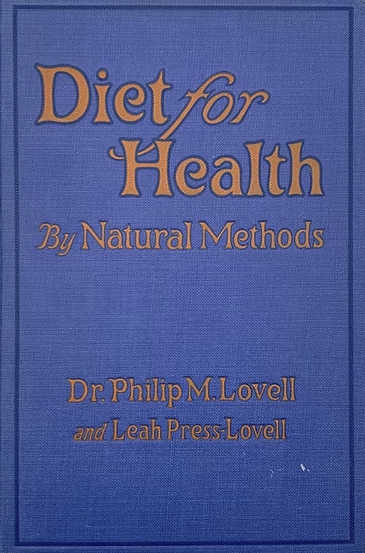
Diet for Health by Natural Methods

=== Naturopathy ===
Lovell promoted exercise, nudism, sunbathing and a meatless diet. He authored Diet for Health by Natural Methods in 1927 which advocated a vegetarian diet and sample menus for ailments and conditions. The book advocated for a naturopathic philosophy based on vitalism. He argued that foods in their natural state are alive and give the body "vital energy" and "replenish the tissues which are constantly being destroyed". He believed that foods possess "vitality" and that this living principle is transferred to the body. Lovell campaigned against the use of drugs and medicines as these are not food thus must not enter the body as they jeopardize the vital energy. He also argued for consumption of raw natural foods as he believed that cooked, processed or preserved foods diminish the vital food principle. Photographer Edward Weston was influenced by Lovell's book and philosophy. He took photographs of sliced fruits and vegetables which were alleged to reveal the food's lifeforce.

Lovell recommended for adults eight or nine hours of sleep a night in an open sleeping porch or in bed adjacent to a wide open window. He also instructed adults to have a cold shower in the morning with thirty to sixty minute walks each day and to practice deep breathing exercises.

=== Vegetarianism ===
Lovell was influenced by Otto Carque who he described as "the first pioneer in the California pure food movement". Lovell advocated for a vegetarian diet but only if it was based on unprocessed foods. He criticized vegetarians who consumed processed cereal products, cakes, cookies, jams, sugars and soft drinks. In a 1941 article he stated that a diet based on a limited amount of unprocessed meat with vegetables is preferable to a processed vegetarian diet based on cakes and sugars. He recommended a diet of fresh fruit juices, raw fruits and vegetables, nuts, whole wheat bread and butter. Lovell opposed the use of salt, pepper and vinegar. He believed that cancer was largely driven by food adulteration and commented that "vegetarians seldom seem to have cancer if the foods are washed thoroughly".

Lovell was supportive of John and Vera Richter's raw food vegetarian restaurant, the Eutropheon. He lectured on how to prepare "unfired foods".

== Personal life ==
He married Leah Press in 1923. She was a teacher at Lovell House. They had three sons.

== Selected publications ==
- The Avocado and Health. Edwin G. Hart. 1920.
- The Health of the Child. Times-Mirror Press. 1926.
- Diet for Health by Natural Methods. Times-Mirror Press. 1927.
- Sex and You: A Care of the Body Book. Wolfer Printing Company. 1940.
