= Prudential Assurance Building =

Prudential Assurance Building may refer to:

- Prudential Assurance Building, Liverpool
- Holborn Bars, London (former Prudential Assurance headquarters in Holborn)
