= Lovell House =

Historic house in Los Angeles, California

- U.S. National Register of Historic Places
- Los Angeles Historic-Cultural Monument
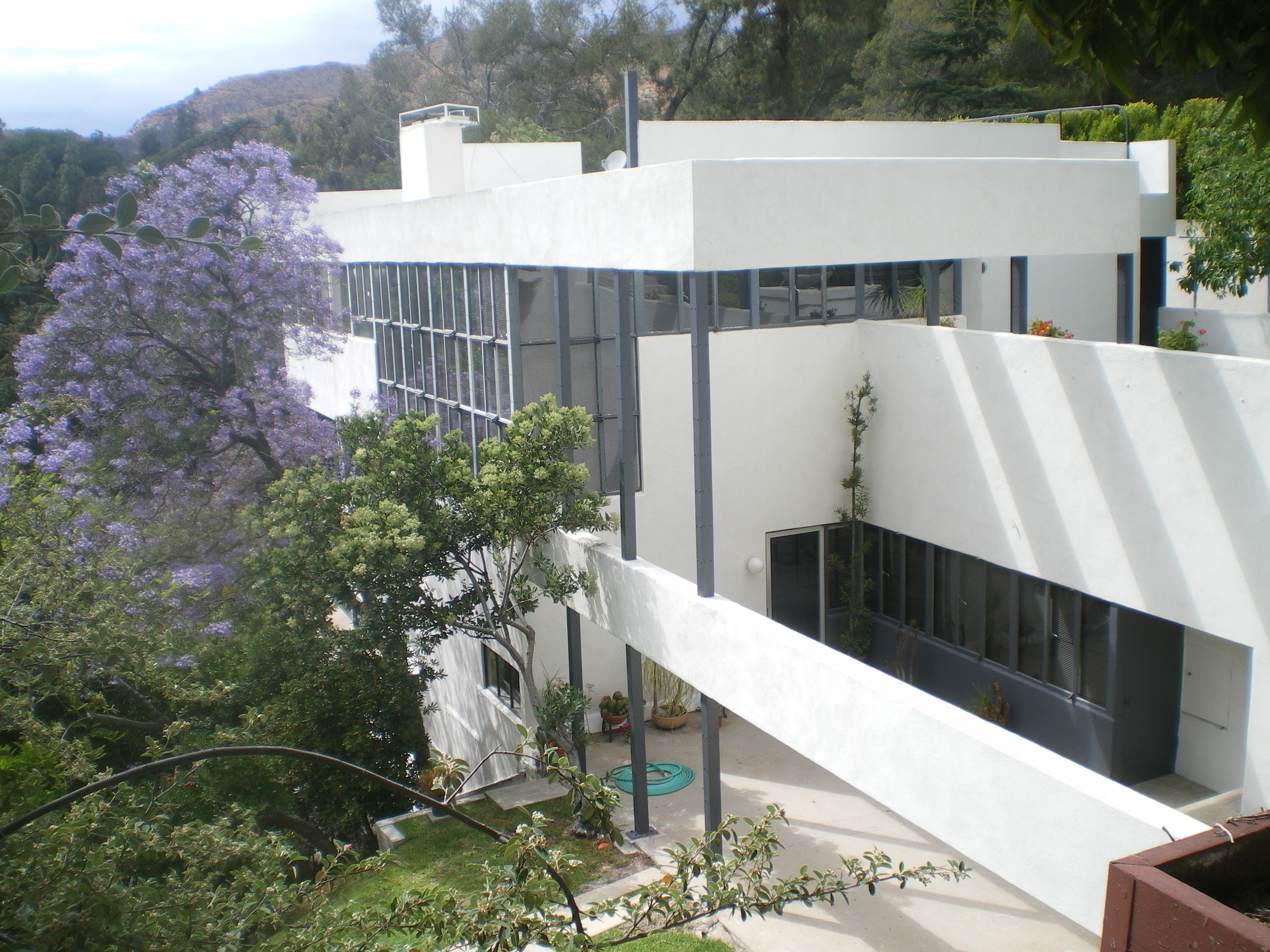

- Location within the Los Angeles metropolitan area Location within California Location within the United States
- Location: 4616 Dundee Dr, Los Angeles, CA 90027
- Coordinates: 34°7′5.4″N 118°17′16″W
- Area: 2.5 acres (1.0 ha)
- Built: 1928
- Architect: Richard Neutra
- Architectural style: International style
- NRHP reference No.: 71000147
- LAHCM No.: 123

Significant dates
- Added to NRHP: October 14, 1971
- Designated LAHCM: March 20, 1974

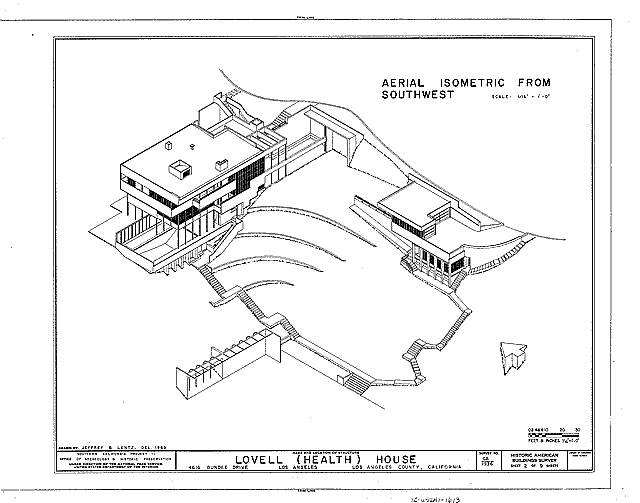
Lovell House Isometric view (HABS drawing)

The Lovell House or Lovell Health House is an International style modernist residence designed and built by Richard Neutra between 1927 and 1929. The home, located at 4616 Dundee Drive in the Los Feliz neighborhood of Los Angeles, California, was built for the physician and naturopath Philip Lovell. It is considered a major monument in architectural history, and was a turning point in Neutra's career.

It is often described as the first steel frame house in the United States, and also an early example of the use of gunite (sprayed-on concrete). Neutra was familiar with steel construction due to his earlier work with the Chicago firm Holabird & Roche. Neutra served as the contractor for the project because no residential contractors were willing to construct a steel frame home due to the industry's unfamiliarity with and outright distaste for industrial materials employed for residential work.

== History ==
Philip M. Lovell was enchanted with the house and praised his architect publicly. Lovell had previously commissioned architect Rudolf Schindler to build the landmark Lovell Beach House in 1926. Neutra and Schindler were contemporaries in Europe and the Neutras lived with the Schindlers (Schindler House) when they first settled in Los Angeles in 1925. Lovell chose Neutra instead of Schindler to build his Los Angeles home while they were living under the same roof. Neutra was known for his relationships with his clients—he thought of himself as a therapist and the client his patient. He spent time getting to know his clients and analyzed their needs.

Philip Lovell's unconventional health philosophies heavily influenced the design and purpose of the Lovell House. Known for his advocacy of natural living, Lovell emphasized the integration of health-focused features such as outdoor spaces for sunbathing, a rooftop solarium, and rooms designed to maximize UV exposure. The home was one of the first in Los Angeles to include spaces dedicated to nude sunbathing, outdoor exercise, and vegetarian meal preparation, aligning with his belief in heliotherapy and drug-free living.

Lovell's health-oriented ideals extended beyond architecture; he was a naturopath and a prominent health columnist for the Los Angeles Times. His columns, lectures, and radio broadcasts popularized alternative health practices in California, and the Lovell House became a physical manifestation of his lifestyle beliefs. This combination of health and architecture marked a significant departure from traditional residential designs of the time.

The Lovell house was an expensive house during the time. Lovell paid his contractor $58,672.32. Leah and Philip Lovell had differing views on what they remembered the cost estimate to be. Philip recalled $37,000, while Leah thought, $48,000. There was still an outstanding fee of $413 for Richard Neutra in 1930, which was part of the estimated total of $5863.

The Lovell House was purchased in 1961 by Morton and Betty Topper. It was added to the list of Registered Historic Places in Los Angeles in 1971.

In 2021, art dealers Iwan and Manuela Wirth purchased the property for $8.75 million, "with plans to bring back its original lustre."

== Design ==
The Lovell House underwent multiple design iterations before its final construction. Early designs included an L-shaped structure descending a hillside in three levels, connected by a long balcony on the third floor. These designs emphasized stepped masses and earth ramps leading to a tennis court, reflecting the natural integration central to Richard Neutra's architectural philosophy. Despite its later designation as the "Health House," none of the initial designs included the extensive exercise facilities originally envisioned by Lovell.

In its final form, the house incorporated innovative structural elements, such as open-web steel joists and four-inch-square steel posts spaced at five-foot intervals, emphasizing Neutra's mastery of steel construction techniques. While the steel cantilevers appear freestanding, they are supported by the roof structure. The exterior design features horizontal bands of metal lath and white stucco, creating visual rhythm by juxtaposing vertical and horizontal lines. These bands are further enhanced by the interplay of steel-framed windows and screens, which create a modular appearance emblematic of modernist principles.

The 4,800 sq ft (450 m^{2}), three-story house aesthetically follows many of the principles of the International Style. It was included in the 1932 exhibit at the Museum of Modern Art in New York that retrospectively defined the style. In essence it reflects Neutra's interest in industrial production, and this is most evident in the repetitive use of factory-made window assemblies. In fact, Neutra's apprentice Harwell Hamilton Harris suggested that Neutra was drawn to America because of Henry Ford.

The Lovell House design incorporates functional spaces that reflect both modernist principles and the needs of its inhabitants. The main staircase, described as wide and open, connects the living quarters with a spacious area featuring floor-to-ceiling plate glass windows, providing sweeping views of the ocean and city. A centrally positioned fireplace in this space allows guests to simultaneously enjoy warmth and the dramatic evening skyline, exemplifying Neutra's focus on blending comfort with scenic integration.

A dedicated library space for over a thousand volumes showcases adjustable shelving, direct and indirect lighting through a 52-foot trough, and natural materials such as mouse gray carpeting and natural-colored drapes. The library's design includes a cozy corner with access to an outdoor patio and features built-in telephones and furnishings that highlight the forerunner of modern American interior finishes.

The interior reflects Neutra's interest in Cubism, transparency, and hygiene. The "minimal" detailing shows the influence of Irving Gill. In another nod to industrial production, Neutra installed two Ford Model-A headlights in the main stairwell. (The headlights were provided by Neutra apprentice Gregory Ain.) The Historic American Buildings Survey described the Lovell House as "a prime example of residential architecture where technology creates the environment."

The exterior consisted of a lightweight steel frame construction. The building used standard sections that related to the unit plan. The porches and balconies hung down from the roof level. This was done in order to avoid scattering the depth. The walls outside were 3.6" expanded metal reinforced with 1 1/4" of dense concrete walls (using spray-on concrete). The entrance of the house is on the top story, through a terrace. Upon entry, there is a framed view of an extravagant stairway. The main level of the house enclosed the living, dining, and guest rooms. The main level also had the kitchen while the top floor consisted of the family bedrooms.

== In film productions and photography ==
The house was used in the 1997 film L.A. Confidential as the home of Pierce Morehouse Patchett, played by David Strathairn. It was also depicted in the film Beginners (Mike Mills, 2010) as the home of Oliver (Ewan McGregor) and his father Hal (Christopher Plummer). The house was first photographed by Willard Morgan (1900-1967). Photographs of the building were regarded highly so that the building could be seen by many other people. These images were included in the Modern Architecture exhibition of 1932 at the New York's Museum of Modern Art (MOMA).

== See also ==
- Lovell Beach House
- Los Angeles Historic-Cultural Monuments in Hollywood and Los Feliz
