= Prudential Overall Supply =

- Industry: Textile
- Founded: 1932
- Founder: John D. Clark
- Headquarters: Irvine, California

Prudential Overall Supply is an American company with headquarters in Irvine, California. The company was founded in 1932 as a uniform and textile laundry service, serving industrial clients such as automotive production facilities. The company currently serves municipal, industrial and service industry companies.

The company was founded by John D. Clark, who served as the company's President until 1972, and served as Chairman Emeritus until his death in 1991. Dan Clark, John's brother took over until 1984, then serving as chairman until his death in 1989.

== History ==
In 1943, Prudential signed a contract with the government to clean and sterilize gas mask components. The company discontinued home laundry, hospital and agency services in favor of garment rentals.

In 1952, Prudential opened its Los Angeles plant, followed by a plant in Van Nuys, California in 1960. In 1961, the company opened a plant in Chula Vista, California. In 1966, the Riverside, California plant was launched, followed by the building of the corporate headquarters in Irvine, California. The company expanded its operations into Milpitas, California in 1971.

The Cerritos Dust Control plant was launched in 1972. In 1976 a plant in Irvine was opened. In 1978, Prudential began serving the Arizona area with the acquisition of Tucson Supreme Cleaners, representing the company's ninth plant. The company continued its expansion efforts in both California and Arizona, opening plants in Carson, California and Phoenix, Arizona.

Throughout the 1980s the company opened plants in Irvine, CA, Milpitas industrial and Milpitas cleanroom, California Plants, Fremont, CA (now Milpitas cleanroom), Los Angeles, CA cleanroom Plant, Fresno, CA, Moorpark, CA, Mesa, AZ cleanroom Plant, Phoenix, Arizona, Round Rock, Texas cleanroom Plant and Vista, CA.

In 1994, the company began global operations through a cooperative venture with AMPri Rubberware to operate a cleanroom near Kuala Lumpur, Malaysia.

In September 2015 Prudential Overall Supply acquired operations of now bankrupt laundry firm Coyne International Enterprises in Virginia and South Carolina.

In March 2019, it was announced that Prudential had a five-year contract with Consolidated Laundry Machinery (CLM), which includes the purchase of CLM's dryer technology. In June 2019, it received a "STAR Site" designation from the Arizona Division of Occupational Safety and Health Consultation Department for " exemplary and comprehensive safety and health management systems." Later in June, it was announced that there would be a leadership transition at the end of the year when president Tom Watts retires. Then-CEO Dan Clark stepped down from this position for his son John Clark to take over while he remains as a member of the company's board of directors. In July 2019, the company renewed its ISO 9001:2015 certification.

The company was covered by Morley Safer on the American Medical Review episode covering cleanroom processing and technology.
