= WhatsOnStage Awards 2026 =

British theatre awards

26th WhatsOnStage Awards
- Date: 8 March 2026
- Location: London Palladium
- Hosted by: Gina and Mazz Murray
- Most wins: Paddington: The Musical (9)
- Most nominations: Paddington: The Musical (14)

Television/radio coverage
- Produced by: Alex Wood, Darius Thompson, Alex Parker and Damian Sandys

The 26th WhatsOnStage Awards took place on 8 March 2026 at The London Palladium for the third time, with nominations opening on 6 November 2026. The event is co-produced by Alex Wood, Darius Thompson, Alex Parker and Damian Sandys.

== Winners and nominees ==
The nominees for the 25th WhatsOnStage Awards were announced on 11 December 2025 by Into the Woods stars Gracie McGonigal, Hana Ichijo and Gabrielle Lewis-Dodson at the Bridge Theatre in London. The winners were then revealed at a ceremony at The London Palladium

Best New Play	Best New Musical
The Comedy About Spies; Inter Alia; Born With Teeth; Clarkston; Stereophonic; Through It All Together	Paddington: The Musical; The Great Gatsby; Hercules; Here and Now; Shucked; Titanique
Best Play Revival	Best Musical Revival
Richard II; Much Ado About Nothing; The Lady from the Sea; The Seagull; The Importance of Being Earnest; A Streetcar Named Desire	Evita; Brigadoon; Jesus Christ Superstar; Little Shop of Horrors; My Fair Lady; The Producers
Best Performer in a Play	Best Supporting Performer in a Play
Jonathan Bailey, Richard II; Ncuti Gatwa, Born With Teeth; Tom Hiddleston, Much Ado About Nothing; Joe Locke, Clarkston; Maxine Peake, The Last Stand of Mrs Mary Whitehouse; Rosamund Pike, Inter Alia	Stephen Fry, The Importance of Being Earnest; Emma Corrin, The Seagull; Joe Alwyn, The Lady from the Sea; Yerin Ha, The Maids; Sophie Melville, Clarkston; Mason Alexander Park, Much Ado About Nothing
Best Performer in a Musical	Best Supporting Performer in a Musical
Rachel Zegler, Evita; James Hameed and Arti Shah, Paddington The Musical; Lauren Drew, Titanique; Lucie Jones, 13 Going On 30; Jamie Muscato, The Great Gatsby; Diego Andres Rodriguez, Evita	Amber Davies, The Great Gatsby; Bella Brown, Evita; Candace Furbert, Sharlene Hector, Brianna Ogunbawo, Malinda Parris and Robyn Rose-Li, Hercules; Victoria Hamilton-Barritt, Paddington: The Musical; Grace Mouat, 13 Going On 30; Layton Williams, Titanique
Best Takeover Performance	Best Professional Debut Performance
Emma Kingston, Wicked; Stevie Doc, The Devil Wears Prada; Rob Madge, Cabaret; Eva Noblezada, Cabaret; Alex Young, Operation Mincemeat; Karis Anderson, Moulin Rouge! The Musical	Timi Akinyosade, Paddington: The Musical; Mia Carragher, The Hunger Games: on Stage; Hannah Dodd, Cabaret; Jess Folley, Burlesque; Ruaridh Mollica, Clarkston; Asha Parker-Wallace, Burlesque
Best Direction	Best Musical Direction/Supervision
Luke Sheppard, Paddington: The Musical; Tamara Harvey, The Constant Wife; Jamie Lloyd, Much Ado About Nothing; Thomas Ostermeier, The Seagull; Tim Sheader, Natasha, Pierre & The Great Comet of 1812; Lynette Linton, Intimate Apparel	Matt Brind, Paddington: The Musical; Tom Brady, Hamlet Hail to the Thief; Justin Craig, Stereophonic; Stuart Morley, Jesus Christ Superstar; Sarah Travis, Davey Anderson and Ali Roocroft, Wild Rose; Alan Williams, Evita
Best Choreography	Best Sound Design
Fabian Aloise, Evita; Ellen Kane, Ballet Shoes; Ellen Kane, Paddington: The Musical; Lorin Latarro, The Producers; Drew McOnie, Brigadoon; Jennifer Weber, 13 Going On 30	Gareth Owen, Paddington: The Musical; Adam Fisher, Evita; Tony Gayle, Wild Rose; Tom Gibbons, The Seagull; Ryan Rumery, Stereophonic; Gareth Tucker and Nick Lidster for Autograph, Natasha, Pierre & The Great Comet of 1812
Best Set Design	Best Costume Design
Tom Pye, Paddington: The Musical; Frankie Bradshaw, Ballet Shoes; Lizzie Clachan, The Lady from the Sea; Paul Tate dePoo III, The Great Gatsby; Michael Taylor, My Fair Lady; David Zinn, Stereophonic	Gabriella Slade and Zahra Jafar, Paddington: The Musical; Alex Berry, Intimate Apparel; Linda Cho, The Great Gatsby; Colin Richmond, The Red Shoes; Rae Smith, The Importance of Being Earnest; Michael Taylor, My Fair Lady
Best Lighting Design	Best Casting
Jon Clark, Evita; Paule Constable, The Unlikely Pilgrimage of Harold Fry; Neil Austin, Born With Teeth; Neil Austin, Paddington: The Musical; Howard Hudson, Natasha, Pierre & The Great Comet of 1812; Jessica Hung Han Yun, Hamlet Hail to the Thief	Natalie Gallacher, for Pippa Ailion & Natalie Gallacher Casting, Nick Hockaday and Annabelle Davis, Paddington: The Musical; Stuart Burt, Make It Happen; Alastair Coomer, The Importance of Being Earnest; Pippa Ailion, for Pippa Ailion & Natalie Gallacher Casting, Natasha, Pierre & The Great Comet of 1812; Bryony Jarvis-Taylor, Here We Are; Pearson Casting, Titanique
Best Video Design	Best Wigs, Hair and Make Up Design
Jamie Lloyd (Director), Nick Ward (Video Systems and Programmer) and David Anderson (Camera Supervisor), Evita; Zakk Hein, The Maids; Luke Halls, Sing Street; Andrzej Goulding, Born With Teeth; Ash J Woodward, Paddington: The Musical; Will Duke, Hamlet, Hail to the Thief	Campbell Young Associates, Paddington: The Musical; Georgia Lowe, Little Shop of Horrors; Charles G LaPointe, Rachael Geier (Wigs and Hair) and Ashley Ryan (Make-up), The Great Gatsby; Mia M Neal (Wigs and Hair) and Kirk Cambridge-Del Pesche (Make-up), Hercules; Grace Smart, Cyrano de Bergerac; Rae Smith, with Kate Elizabeth, Campbell Young Associates and Adele Brandman, The Importance of Being Earnest
Best Off-West End Production	Best Regional Production
Young Frankenstein; Be More Chill; The Last Five Years; The Frogs; Brixton Calling; Cul de Sac	13 Going On 30; Come Fall in Love – The DDLJ Musical; Jesus Christ Superstar; Krapp’s Last Tape; Pride and Prejudice; Through It All Together
Best Concert Event	Best West End Show
Rachel Zegler: Live at The London Palladium, The London Palladium; The Book Thief in Concert, Prince of Wales Theatre; Gravity, Theatre Royal, Drury Lane; The Hunchback of Notre Dame in Concert, Prince Edward Theatre; Jeremy Jordan: Live at the Royal Albert Hall, Royal Albert Hall; Songs for a New World – 30th Anniversary Concert, Eventim Apollo, Hammersmith	Les Misérables; Cabaret; Operation Mincemeat; Hadestown; Wicked; Oliver!
Special Award: Services to UK Theatre
James Graham (Playwright and Screenwriter)

== Productions with multiple accolades ==
=== Multiple wins ===
- 7 wins: Paddington: The Musical, a record for a new West End musical
- 5 wins: Evita
- 2 wins: Richard II
