= Anyone Can Whistle =

Musical by Stephen Sondheim and Arthur Laurents

- Cover of the original cast recording.
- Music: Stephen Sondheim
- Lyrics: Stephen Sondheim
- Book: Arthur Laurents
- Productions: 1964 Broadway; 1995 Carnegie Hall concert 2010 New York City Center Encores! 2022 Off-West End

Anyone Can Whistle is a musical with music and lyrics by Stephen Sondheim, and a book by Arthur Laurents. Described as "a satire on conformity and the insanity of the so-called sane," the show tells a story of an economically depressed town whose corrupt mayor decides to create a fake miracle in order to attract tourists. The phony miracle draws the attention of an emotionally inhibited nurse, a crowd of inmates from a local asylum, and a doctor with secrets of his own.

Following a tryout period in Philadelphia, Anyone Can Whistle opened at the Majestic Theatre on April 4, 1964, with Angela Lansbury making her stage musical debut. The show received widely varied reviews (including negative notices from the New York Times and the New York Herald Tribune), and closed after a run of twelve previews and nine performances.

While the score has become an acclaimed part of Sondheim's canon, Anyone Can Whistle has seen relatively few productions compared to other Sondheim musicals. The title song, "Everybody Says Don't", and "There Won't Be Trumpets" have been performed widely.

== Background ==
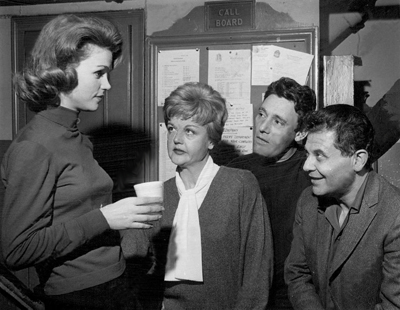
Lee Remick, Angela Lansbury, Harry Guardino, and Herbert Greene

The show was first announced in The New York Times on October 5, 1961: "For the winter of 1962, [Arthur Laurents] is nurturing another musical project, The Natives Are Restless. The narrative and staging will be Mr. Laurent's handiwork; music and lyrics that of Stephen Sondheim. A meager description was furnished by Mr. Laurents, who refused to elaborate. Although the title might indicate otherwise, it is indigenous in content and contemporary in scope. No producer yet." No news of the show appeared until July 14, 1963, in an article in The New York Times about Kermit Bloomgarden, where it discussed the four shows he was producing for the coming season; two were maybes, two were definite. One of the latter was a Sondheim-Laurents musical (now named Side Show). In a letter to Bloomgarden, Laurents wrote, "I beg you not to mention the money problems or any difficulties to Steve anymore. It depresses him terribly and makes it terribly difficult for him to work...It is damn hard to concentrate...when all the atmosphere is filled with gloom and forebodings about will the show get the money to go on?...Spare him the gory details." This behavior was considered unusual for Laurents, who did not have a reputation for kindness. Sondheim discovered that Laurents hated doing backers' auditions and he took over that responsibility, playing and singing more than 30. They found 115 investors to back the $350,000 production, including Richard Rodgers and Sondheim's father.

Eager to work with both Laurents and Sondheim, Angela Lansbury accepted the lead role as Mayoress Cora Hoover Hooper, despite her strong misgivings about the script and her ability to handle the score. Also signed were Lee Remick as Nurse Fay Apple and Harry Guardino as Hapgood. Laurents had wanted Barbra Streisand for the role of Fay, but she turned it down to star in Funny Girl. Following rehearsals in New York City, the company started pre-Broadway tryouts in Philadelphia from March 2 to 21, 1964. Laurents, ignoring criticism about the show's message being trite and its absurdist style difficult to comprehend, poured his energies into restaging rather than dealing with the crux of the problem.

The show suffered further setbacks when supporting actor Henry Lascoe, who played Comptroller Schub, suffered a heart attack during the show's out-of-town tryout, and was replaced by Gabriel Dell. According to Sondheim, "Lansbury was so insecure onstage, and unhappy with her performance, that we considered replacing her. Ironically, it soon became apparent that it had been Lascoe, an old pro...who had made her feel like an amateur. The minute his much less confident understudy took over, she felt free to blossom, which she spectacularly did." Sondheim called the reviews "humiliating" and the audiences "hostile."

== Productions ==
After multiple revisions, the show opened April 4, 1964, at the Majestic Theatre on Broadway, where it closed after 9 performances and 12 previews, unable to overcome negative notices from major papers such as the New York Times and the New York Herald Tribune. Scenic design was by William and Jean Eckart, costume design by Theoni V. Aldredge, and lighting design by Jules Fisher. Choreographer Herbert Ross received the show's sole Tony Award nomination.

The show became a cult favorite, and a truncated recording by the original cast released by Columbia Records sold well among Sondheim fans and musical theater buffs. "There Won't Be Trumpets," a song cut during previews, has become a favorite of cabaret performers.

A staged concert was presented at Carnegie Hall in New York City on April 8, 1995, as a benefit for the Gay Men's Health Crisis. Columbia recorded the concert, preserving for the first time musical passages and numbers not included on the original Broadway cast recording. The cut song "There's Always a Woman" was included for this concert. Lansbury served as narrator, with Madeline Kahn as Cora, Bernadette Peters as Fay, and Scott Bakula as Hapgood. Additional cast included Chip Zien, Ken Page, and Harvey Evans, the only cast member from the original show to reprise his role.

The complete score was recorded in 1997 at Abbey Road Studios with Julia McKenzie, Maria Friedman, and John Barrowman joined by a 42-piece orchestra; the recording went unreleased until December 2020.

Sony reissued the original Broadway cast recording on compact disc in 2003. Two revivals were staged that year: one in London at the Bridewell Theatre and one in Los Angeles at the Matrix Theatre.

The Ravinia Festival presented a staged concert on August 26 and 27, 2005, with Audra McDonald (Fay), Michael Cerveris (Hapgood), and Patti LuPone (Cora).

Talk Is Free Theatre presented the Canadian professional premiere (in concert) on January 11, 2008, at the Gryphon Theatre in Barrie, Ontario, with a fundraiser performance on January 13 at the Diesel Playhouse in Toronto, Ontario. It starred Adam Brazier as Hapgood, Kate Hennig as Cora, Blythe Wilson as Fay, and Richard Ouzounian as Narrator, who also served as director. Choreography was by Sam Strasfeld. Additional cast included Juan Chioran as Comptroller Schub, Jonathan Monro as Treasurer Cooley, and Mark Harapiak as Chief Magruder. Musical direction was provided by Wayne Gwillim.

Encores! presented a staged concert from April 8 through April 11, 2010, with Sutton Foster as Nurse Fay Apple, Donna Murphy as Mayoress Cora Hoover Hooper, and Raul Esparza as Hapgood, with direction and choreography by Casey Nicholaw. The production was the second most attended in Encores! history, and Stephen Sondheim was present at the post-matinee talkback on April 10.

A London production of Anyone can Whistle opened at the Jermyn Street Studio Theatre, London, in association with Primavera Productions, running from March 10, 2010, to April 17, 2010. The director is Tom Littler, with Musical Director Tom Attwood, and a cast that includes Issy van Randwyck (Mayoress), Rosalie Craig (Nurse Fay Apple) and David Ricardo-Pearce (Hapgood).

Porchlight Music Theatre presented Anyone Can Whistle in 2013 as a part of "Porchlight Revisits" series, in which it staged three forgotten musicals per year. It was directed by Christopher Pazdernik and music directed by Aaron Benham.

A new production directed by Phil Willmott opened at the Union Theatre in London, running from February 8 through March 11, 2017.

A concert presentation of the show was presented by MasterVoices, under the direction and baton of Ted Sperling, on March 10, 2022, at Carnegie Hall in New York City. This production featured Vanessa Williams (Cora Hoover Hooper), Santino Fontana (J. Bowden Hapgood), Elizabeth Stanley (Fay Apple), Douglas Sills (Comptroller Schub), Eddie Cooper (Treasurer Cooley), and Michael Mulheren (Police Chief Magruder). Joanna Gleason served as the narrator for the event

A new London production of the show ran at the Southwark Playhouse in 2022 under the direction of Georgie Rankcom, with musical direction by Natalie Pound, and choreography by Lisa Stevens. The show's cast featured Alex Young as Cora Hoover Hooper, Chrystine Symone as Nurse Fay Apple, and Jordan Broatch as J. Bowden Hapgood. This production was the largest staged version of the show since its debut on Broadway in 1964.

== Plot ==
=== Act One ===
The story is set in an imaginary American town that has gone bankrupt. (Its former major industry was an unidentified product that never wore out. Everyone has one now, and no one needs a replacement.) The only place in town doing good business is the local mental asylum, known as "The Cookie Jar", whose inmates look much healthier than the disgruntled townspeople ("I'm Like the Bluebird"). All the money is in the hands of Cora Hoover Hooper, the stylish, ruthless mayoress and her cronies – Comptroller Schub, Treasurer Cooley, and Police Chief Magruder. Cora appears carried in a litter by her backup singers, and admits that she can accept anything except unpopularity ("Me and My Town"). The scheming Comptroller Schub tells her that he has a plan to save her administration and the town, promising, "It's unethical." He tells her to meet him at the rock on the edge of town. At the rock, a local mother, Mrs. Schroeder, tries to tell her child, Baby Joan, to come down from the rock, when Baby Joan licks it – and a spring of water begins flowing from it. The town instantly proclaims a miracle, and Cora and her council eagerly anticipate tourist dollars as they boast of the water's curative powers ("Miracle Song").

It is soon revealed to Cora that the miracle is a fake, controlled by a pump inside the rock. The only person in town who doubts the miracle is Fay Apple, a skeptical but idealistic young nurse from the Cookie Jar. She appears at the rock with all forty-nine of the inmates -- or "Cookies" -- in tow, intending to let them take some of the water. Schub realizes that if they drink the water and remain insane, people will discover the fraud. As he tries to stop Fay, the inmates mingle with the townspeople, until no one can guess who is who. Fay disappears and, hiding from the police, admits that she hopes for a hero to deliver the town from Cora and her lackeys ("There Won't Be Trumpets").

Cora arrives on the scene with the Cookie Jar's manager, Dr. Detmold, who says that Fay has taken the records to identify the inmates. He tells Cora that he is expecting a new assistant who might help them. At that moment a mysterious stranger, J. Bowden Hapgood, arrives asking for directions to the Cookie Jar. He is instantly taken for the new assistant. Asked to identify the missing Cookies, Hapgood begins questioning random people and sorting them into two groups, group A, and group one, without divulging which group is the sane one. The town council becomes suspicious, but Hapgood simply questions them until they begin to doubt their own sanity. Cora is too caught up with his logic to care ("Simple"). As the extended musical sequence ends, the lights black out except for a spotlight on Hapgood, who announces to the audience, "You are all mad!" Seconds later, the stage lights are restored, and the cast is revealed in theater seats, holding programs, applauding the audience, as the act ends.

=== Act Two ===
The two groups are now in a bitter rivalry over which is the sane group ("A-1 March"). Another stranger, a French woman in a feathered coat appears. It is really Fay Apple in disguise. She introduces herself as the Lady from Lourdes, a professional Miracle Inspector, who has come to investigate the miracle. As Schub runs off to warn Cora, Fay seeks out Hapgood in his hotel, and the two seduce each other in the style of a French romantic film ("Come Play Wiz Me").

Fay tries to get Hapgood's help in exposing the miracle. Hapgood, however, sees through her disguise and wants to question her first. Fay refuses to take her wig off and confesses to him that this disguise, leftover from a college play, is the only way she can break out of her shell. She begins to hope, however, that Hapgood may be the one who can help her learn to be free ("Anyone Can Whistle"). Meanwhile, the two groups continue to march, and Cora, trying to give a speech, realizes that Hapgood has stolen her limelight ("A Parade in Town").

She and Schub plan an emergency meeting at her house. Back at the hotel, Hapgood comes up with an idea, telling Fay to destroy the Cookies' records, so both they and Fay can be free. When Fay is reluctant, Hapgood produces a record of his own – he is her fiftieth Cookie. He is a practicing idealist who, after years of attempted heroism, is tired of crusading and has come to the Cookie Jar to retire. Inspired by his record, Fay begins to tear the records up. As she does, the Cookies appear and begin to dance ("Everybody Says Don't").

=== Act Three ===
Cora is at her house with her council. Schub has put the miracle on hiatus but announces that they can easily pin the blame on Hapgood. The group celebrates their alliance ("I've Got You to Lean On"). A mob forms outside the hotel, and Hapgood and Fay, still disguised, take refuge under the rock. Discovering the fraud, Cora and the council confront them. At that moment, Cora receives a telegram from the governor warning that if the quota of 49 cookies is not filled, she will be impeached. Schub tells her that since Hapgood never said who is sane or not, they can arrest anyone at random until the quota is filled. Hapgood refuses to help Fay stop the Mayoress since he has given up crusading. Although she knows she still isn't out of her shell, Fay angrily swears to go it alone ("See What it Gets You").

As Cora and the police force begin rounding up Cookies, Fay tries to get the key to the wagon from the guards in an extended ballet sequence ("The Cookie Chase"). As it ends, Fay is captured, and Dr. Detmold recognizes her. Fay tells the townspeople about the fake miracle, but the town refuses to believe her. Detmold tells Cora that even without the records, Fay can identify the inmates from memory. Cora warns that she will arrest forty-nine people, normal or not, and Fay, helplessly, identifies all the Cookies, except Hapgood. She tells him the world needs people like him, and Hapgood can't turn himself in. He asks Fay to come with him, but she still can't bring herself to break free. They regretfully part ways ("With So Little to Be Sure Of").

Word comes of a new miracle from the town beyond the valley, of a statue with a warm heart, and the townspeople, including Magruder and Cooley, rush off to see if it is real. Soon the town is all but deserted, and Cora is alone again. Again, Schub has the answer – they can turn the entire town into one big Cookie Jar. Cora realizes she and Schub are meant for each other, and they dance off together. As Fay resumes work, Detmold's real new assistant Jane Borden Osgood arrives, and Fay is horrified to realize that she is even more rigid and disbelieving than Fay herself, and the new nurse marches the Cookies off to the next town to disprove the new miracle. Horrified at seeing what she might become, Fay returns to the rock calling for Hapgood. When he doesn't answer, she tries to whistle – and succeeds in blowing a shrill, ugly whistle. Hapgood appears again, saying, "That's good enough for me." As they embrace, the water begins flowing from the rock – a true miracle this time ("Finale").

== Notable casts ==
Character	Broadway	Carnegie Hall Concert	Encores!	Carnegie Hall Revival	Off-West End
Character	1964	1995	2010	2022	
Cora Hoover Hooper	Angela Lansbury	Madeline Kahn	Donna Murphy	Vanessa Williams	Alex Young
Fay Apple	Lee Remick	Bernadette Peters	Sutton Foster	Elizabeth Stanley	Chrystine Symone
J. Bowden Hapgood	Harry Guardino	Scott Bakula	Raúl Esparza	Santino Fontana	Jordan Broatch
Comptroller Schub	Gabriel Dell	Walter Bobbie	Edward Hibbert	Douglas Sills	Danny Lane
Treasurer Cooley	Arnold Soboloff	Chip Zien	Jeff Blumenkrantz	Eddie Cooper	Samuel Clifford
Police Chief Magruder	James Frawley	Ken Page	John Ellison Conlee	Michael Mulheren	Renan Teodoro
Mrs. Schroeder	Peg Murray	Maureen Moore	Linda Griffin	Colleen Brown	Kathryn Akin
Dr. Detmold	Don Doherty	Nick Wyman	Patrick Wetzel	Mark Spergel	Nathan Taylor
Cora's Boys	Sterling Clark, Harvey Evans, Larry Roquemore, and Tucker Smith	Sterling Clark, Harvey Evans, Evan Pappas, Eric Riley, and Tony Stevens	Clyde Alves, Grasan Kingsbury, Eric Sciotto, and Anthony Wayne	Cut from the show	Cut from the show

== Musical numbers ==
(from the Broadway production)

Act I

- Prelude Act I (instrumental) — Orchestra
- I'm Like the Bluebird — Company
- Me and My Town — Cora Hoover Hooper and Boys
- Miracle Song — Cora, Treasurer Cooley, Townspeople, Tourists, and Pilgrims
- There Won't Be Trumpets — Fay Apple*^
- Simple — J. Bowden Hapgood and Company

Act II

- Prelude Act II (instrumental) — Orchestra
- A-1 March — Company
- Come Play Wiz Me — Fay, Hapgood, and Boys
- Anyone Can Whistle — Fay
- A Parade In Town — Cora
- Everybody Says Don't — Hapgood
- Don't Ballet (instrumental) — Orchestra

Act III

- Prelude Act III (instrumental) — Orchestra
- I've Got You to Lean On — Cora, Comptroller Schub, Treasurer Cooley, Chief Magruder, and Boys
- See What It Gets You — Fay
- Anyone Can Whistle (Reprise) — Fay
- Cora's Chase (The Cookie Chase) — Company
- I'm Like the Bluebird (Reprise 1) — Cookies
- With So Little to Be Sure Of — Fay and Hapgood
- I've Got You to Lean On (Reprise) — Cora and Schub*
- I'm Like the Bluebird (Reprise 2) — Cookies
- Finale Ultimo (instrumental) — Orchestra†

Notes

- * song was cut during Previews.
- ^ Despite being cut from the original production, It was recorded for the original Broadway cast recording, but unreleased until a 1989 remastered CD. Restored after the 1995 concert production.
- † Combined "With So Little to Be Sure Of" on the Original Cast Recording.

== Critical response ==
Howard Taubman in his The New York Times review wrote that Laurents's "book lacks the fantasy that would make the idea work, and his staging has not improved matters. Mr. Sondheim has written several pleasing songs but not enough of them to give the musical wings. The performers yell rather than talk and run rather than walk. The dancing is the cream."

Steven Suskin wrote in his 2000 book about Broadway composers: The "fascinating extended musical scenes, with extended choral work... immediately marked Sondheim as the most distinctive theatre composer of his time. The first act sanity sequence... and the third act chase... are unlike anything that came before."

== Awards and nominations ==
=== Original Broadway production ===
Year	Award ceremony	Category	Nominee	Result
1964	Tony Award	Best Choreography	Herbert Ross	Nominated
