= Jack Shalloo =

English actor and singer

Jack Shalloo is an English actor and singer. He has acted in musical theatre as Lewis in Our House, Hamlet in Hamlet The Musical and Pete in Departure Lounge. As a singer, Shalloo released the album London Soul in 2011.

== Life and career ==
Shalloo was born in Hornchurch, Greater London. He trained at Colin's Performing Arts School, London. In 2008, Shalloo had the role of Lewis in Our House. In 2010, he went on to play the role of Pete in the musical Departure Lounge, by Dougal Irvine, at the Waterloo East Theatre alongside Steven Webb, Chris Fountain, Verity Rushworth and Liam Tamne. In 2011, he earned a role in The Kissing Dance, with music by Howard Goodall. He also held the title role as Hamlet in Hamlet The Musical at the Edinburgh Festival Fringe and again in 2011 on a tour of South England.

In 2011, he released his debut album "London Soul". An album of 9 songs, it debuted on BBC Northamptonshire in May 2011, where Hamlet The Musical opened its tour.

In 2023, he appeared in a production of Assassins at the Chichester Festival Theatre as John Hinckley Jr.

== Career ==
=== Film ===
Year	Title	Role	Notes
2010	Kick Off	Jenson	
2010	Fit	Charlie	
2011	Bashment	White Supremacist Cellmate 2	
2013	The One That Got Away	Oliver	Short Film
2013	Awkward Turtle	Dan	Short Film
2015	Mockumentary	Ian	Short Film
2015	Monster Hunters	Zed	TV movie
2018	Curveball	Deebo	TV movie
2019	Lynn + Lucy	Tim	
2019	1917	Private Seymour	
2025	Hamnet	Marcellus	
TBA	Close Personal Friends †	TBA	Post-production

=== Television ===
Year	Title	Role	Notes
2005	The Bill	Darren Greene	TV series - Episode: When Justice Isn't Enough - Part 1
2007	Wainwright: The Man Who Loved the Lakes	Young Wainwright	TV movie documentary
2008	Holby City	Zack Thomas	TV series
2008	The Man Who Loved the Lakes	Young Alfred	TV series
2014	The Suspicions of Mr Whicher	Judd	TV series - Episode: The Suspicions of Mr Whicher: Beyond the Pale
2014	Doctors	Darren Moored	TV series - Episode: About Time
2015	The Interceptor	Fergus	TV series - Episode: #1.7
2016	Dickensian	Constable Duff	TV series
2017	People Just Do Nothing	Kold FM guy	TV series
2018	Humans	Estate Agent	TV series - Episode #3.3
2018	Doctor Who	Yoss Inkl	TV series TV Series - Episode: The Tsuranga Conundrum
2018	Call the Midwife	Bobby Hollier	TV series - Christmas Special
2018	Doctor Who Access All Areas	Himself	Web series; guest; 1 episode
2019	London Kills	Perry Thompson / Perry Evans	TV series
2019	White Gold	Steve Davis	TV series - Episode #2.2
2020	White House Farm	Constable John Turner	TV series
2020	Belgravia	Morris	TV series
2021	Stay Close	Brian Goldberg	TV series
2023	The Tower	PC Colin Ryle	TV series

=== Theatre ===
Year	Title	Role	Notes
2008	Our House (musical) by Tim Firth	Lewis	Cambridge Theatre, London
2010	Departure Lounge	Pete	Criterion Theatre, London
2011	Hamlet (The Musical), Rockabye Hamlet by William Shakespeare	Prince Hamlet	Royal & Derngate, Northampton
2013	Charlie and the Chocolate Factory the Musical by David Greig	Mr Bucket	Theatre Royal Drury Lane, London directed by Sam Mendes
2014	Like Me (musical)	Luke	The Courtyard Theatre, London
2017	Girl From The North Country	Elias	The Old Vic, London
2023	Assassins	John Hinckley Jr.	Chichester Festival Theatre

=== YouTube ===
Year	Title	Role	Notes
2018	"Stealing Our Friend's Brain Backup PRANK (GONE WRONG!!!) 🤯🤯🤯" (⏩ season 1, episode 3)	Callum	Third episode of a series of sf shorts by Tom Scott
