= Joanna Woodward (actress) =

English stage performer

- Born: Joanna Mary Woodward; 1988 (age 37–38)
- Education: Central School of Speech and Drama
- Years active: 2009–present
- Spouse: Luke Hatfield (m. 2016)
- Children: 2

Joanna Mary Woodward (born 1988) is an English actress. She is known for her musical theatre work.

== Early life ==
Woodward grew up in Glastonbury. She attended St Dunstan's Community School and Bridgwater and Taunton College. She went on to graduate from the Central School of Speech and Drama in 2009 with a Bachelor of Arts in Acting (Musical Theatre).

== Career ==
Upon graduating from drama school, Woodward appeared in the 2009 and 2010 productions of The Adventures of Jason and the Argonauts at the Scoop and Pages: Promised Land at the Union Theatre, both in South London, as well as Puss in Boots at the Corn Exchange in Newbury. In 2011, she starred as Audrey in a production of Little Shop of Horrors at Kilworth House in Leicestershire.

Woodward made her West End debut with roles as an understudy in Merrily We Roll Along at the Menier Chocolate Factory and Coco DuBois in The Hurly Burly Show at the Duchess Theatre. In 2013 and 2014, she played Tinkerbell and Gwendolyn in the musical Lost Boy at the Finborough Theatre and Charing Cross Theatre. She also appeared in Fings Ain't Wot They Used T'Be at the Theatre Royal Stratford East.

In 2015, Woodward joined the original West End cast of Beautiful: The Carole King Musical at the Aldwych Theatre as Betty. She was also an understudy for the titular Carole King. For her performance in the 2017 production of The Life at Southwark Playhouse, Woodward was nominated for the Offie for Best Supporting Female In A Musical.

Woodward would originate the role of Clare opposite David Hunter in the stage musical adaptation of The Time Traveller's Wife, which had its world premiere at Storyhouse in Chester in 2022 followed by a West End run at the Apollo Theatre in 2023.

== Personal life ==
Woodward married sound designer Luke Hatfield in 2016; the couple had met through Merrily We Roll Along. They have two daughters.

== Stage ==
Year	Title	Role	Notes
2009	The Adventures of Jason and the Argonauts	Princess Atlanta	The Scoop, London
2009–2010	Puss in Boots	Princess Clara	Corn Exchange, Newbury
2010	Pages: Promised Land	Kimberley	Union Theatre, London
2011	Little Shop of Horrors	Audrey	Kilworth House, Leicestershire
2012	The Hurly Burly Show	Coco DuBois	Duchess Theatre, London
2012–2013	Merrily We Roll Along	Newswoman / understudy Beth & Meg	Menier Chocolate Factory, London
2013–2014	Lost Boy	Tinker Bell / Gwendolyn	Finborough Theatre / Charing Cross Theatre, London
2014	Fings Ain't Wot They Used T'Be	Margaret	Theatre Royal Stratford East
2015–2016	Beautiful: The Carole King Musical	Betty / understudy Carole	Aldwych Theatre, London
2017	The Life	Mary	Southwark Playhouse, London
2019	Confessions	Eulpha Miziam	The Other Palace, London
2019	Zombies: The Musical	Emily	The Other Palace, London
2021	Pretty Woman	Susan / Vivian Ward	Piccadilly Theatre / Savoy Theatre, London
2022–2023	The Time Traveller's Wife	Clare	Storyhouse, Chester / Apollo Theatre, London
2024–2026	The Producers	Ulla	Menier Chocolate Factory, London / Garrick Theatre, London
