= Matthew Todd (writer) =

Gay British writer

- Occupation: Magazine editor, writer
- Employer: Attitude (1996–2016)
- Awards: Attitude Pride Award (2017); BSME Scoop of the Year award (2016); BSME Editor of the Year award: Men's brand (2015); BSME Editor of the Year award: Men's brand (2011); Freedom of the City of London (2016); Stonewall Journalist of the Year award (2011)
- Website: www.matthewtodd.net

Matthew Todd (born 1974) is a British writer, editor, and occasional stand-up comedian. He is the author of Straight Jacket - Overcoming Society's Legacy of Gay Shame, a non-fiction title published by Bantam Press in June 2016 and the play Blowing Whistles which has been performed in London, Australia and the United States. He was the editor of the UK gay magazine Attitude between 2008 and 2016 for which he won three British Society of Magazine Editors awards. In June 2016, for his last issue as editor, Prince William sat for the cover of Attitude, the first time a member of the royal family had appeared in a gay magazine.

== Career ==
Todd worked for LGBTQ+ rights group Stonewall in the early 1990s before joining Attitude magazine in 1996. He was editor of Attitude between 2008 and 2016.

For Attitude he conducted Madonna's only UK gay press interview, Daniel Radcliffe's first and only gay press interview in the world, gay rugby player Gareth Thomas's first gay press interview, Boy George's first national magazine interview after he came out of prison, Stephen Gately's first interview after he came out in The Sun and Michael Sam's first UK gay press interview. For his last issue Prince William met a group of LGBT people who had experience bullying that had affected their mental health and appeared on the cover of Attitude, making history as the first time a member of the royal family had done so. He issued a statement to Attitude which said "No one should be bullied for their sexuality or any other reason". This was the first time a member of the British royal family explicitly condemned homophobia.

Todd has made numerous television and radio appearances including on Sky News and BBC News 24, NBC, Lorraine, The Wright Stuff and appeared regularly on the Kate Silverton show on BBC Radio 5 Live.

As a stand-up comedian, Todd was a finalist of the Mardi Gras Comedy Competition and The Big Big Big New Act Competition and appeared on the ITV show Take the Mic. In 2004–2005 he ran and hosted a popular weekly comedy night at the Yard Bar on Rupert Street in London at which performers such as Rhod Gilbert, Alan Carr and Greg Davies.

In 2017 he appeared as himself in the BBC Radio 4 play How Success Ruined Me alongside Christopher Green and Roy Hudd.

== Blowing Whistles ==
Todd's play Blowing Whistles is a dark comedy which seems to celebrate gay sex culture but ends up strongly critiquing it. It had a first run in June 2005 at the Warehouse Theatre, Croydon, where it was directed by Phil Willmott. Following this it was performed at Sound Theatre, off Leicester Square, London, in 2006, and it has since seen productions in Sydney, Melbourne, Adelaide, Fire Island, Boston, Palm Springs and Fort Lauderdale. In 2012 it has been produced in San Francisco and Toronto.

It returned to London transferring to the Leicester Square Theatre in 2008 in a production by Jonathan Altaras, directed by Pete Nettell who directed the Sydney production. It received positive notices from such diverse publications as the gay press through to The Spectator, Sunday Express, Evening Standard and The Stage which compared it to the work of Larry Kramer. Leading website Whatsonstage.com called it "the brightest gay play in ages" and popular theatrical website West End Whingers called it "the best gay play since Beautiful Thing".

== Straight Jacket ==
In June 2016 Todd's first book, Straight Jacket, was released by Bantam Press, part of Penguin Random House. A non-fiction book about the effect of prejudice on LGBT people, it received a positive reception. Singer John Grant wrote the foreword, describing it as "a much needed work of tough love". Elton John described it as "an essential read for every gay person on the planet", Owen Jones called it "utterly brilliant" in The Guardian, singer Will Young on his podcast, Homosapiens, said "It's amazing. I do think it's going to be a seminal work. I think it will be used as a study book, it's that level", popular YouTuber Calum McSwiggan described it "as the book everyone is talking about", writer Juno Dawson said "I believe this powerful book will save lives", Michael Cashman called it "one of the most powerful books I have ever read" and Paris Lees said "This is a hugely important book for everyone. It's changed the way I see myself, other people and the world". Straight Jacket was shortlisted for the Polari First Book Prize and was voted Best LGBT Book of the Year 2017 by readers of Boyz magazine.

== Awards ==
- Stonewall Journalist of the Year 2011
- British Society of Magazine Editor's Men's Magazine Editor of the Year 2011
- British Society of Magazine Editor's Men's Brand Editor of the Year 2015
- British Society of Magazine Editor's Scoop of the Year 2016 for Prince William appearing on the cover of Attitude
- Boyz magazine Best LGBT Book 2017 for Straight Jacket
- Shortlisted for the Polari First Book Prize for Straight Jacket
- Awarded Freedom of the City of London 2017
