= Like Me (musical) =

- 2014 Showcase Window Card
- Music: Garry Lake
- Lyrics: Garry Lake
- Book: Jon Smith
- Productions: 2013 Arts Theatre, London (song cycle); 2014 The Duplex, New York (song cycle); 2014 CMO Club (song cycle); 2014 Courtyard Theatre, London; 2015 Waterloo East Theatre

Like Me is a musical with music and lyrics by Garry Lake and book by Jon Smith. It tells the story of a group of four young adults navigating the social media minefield, looking for each other, for love, for validation and ultimately, for themselves – in amongst a cyber world populated by thousands of 'followers' and 'friends'. Haunted by a lack of self-confidence and self-respect, Emma, Ashley, Luke and Charlie face physical, emotional and psychological challenges, leading them to question their very identity.

Originally conceived as a song cycle by Garry Lake and performed at the Duplex, New York and the CMO Club at the Conrad Hilton, the full-book musical was first seen in a showcase performance at the Courtyard Theatre, London October 3, 2014. Most recently, Like Me was showcased at The Waterloo East Theatre on April 11, 2015.

== Synopsis ==
A twist on the romantic comedy in which four young adults navigate the social media minefield, looking for each other, for love, for validation and ultimately, for themselves – in amongst a cyber world populated by thousands of 'followers' and 'friends'. Haunted by a lack of self-confidence and self-respect, Emma, Ashley, Luke and Charlie face physical, emotional and psychological challenges, leading them to question their very identity. Are they hiding behind their online personae, or is there conviction in their tweets, pins, selfies, posts and status updates? Like the rest of the population, they're digitally aware, armed with Wi-Fi enabled devices and online. Let the tagging begin.

== Musical numbers ==
Act 1

- "Social Media Symphony" — Overture/Instrumental
- "Like Me" — Company
- "Failures A-Z" — Emma
- "I Don't Care" — Ashley, Charlie, Company
- "I'm Yours" — Emma & Luke
- "#ILoveMyJob" — Charlie
- "Didn't Say Hello" — Luke
- "It's Not Me" — Emma & Ashley
- "Time's Called For You" — Emma & Ashley

Act 2

- "Fat" — Phil Mason (INTERVAL)
- "Didn't Have It Easy" — Company
- "Keeping Myself Company" — Company
- "'Fore I Cry" — Emma
- "It's Not Me" - Reprise
- "For Now" — Ashley
- "Network Error" — Company
- "Not Ready To Be Me" — Emma & Ashley
- "Logging Out" — Luke & Charlie
- "Gospel" — Company

== Characters ==
=== Main characters ===
- Emma : A lonely, insecure young woman searching for her perfect man.
- Ashley : An outgoing, adventurous young woman with modelling ambitions.
- Luke: A shy, retiring young man head-over-heels in love with Emma but unwilling or unable to tell her how he feels.
- Charlie : A brash, confident photographer determined to help launch Ashley's modelling career.

=== Minor characters ===
- Phil Mason: A social media junkie constantly interacting online with Emma, Ashley, Luke & Charlie

== Cast ==
| Role | Arts Theatre song cycle cast | The Duplex song cycle cast | CMO Club song cycle cast | The Courtyard Theatre cast | Waterloo East Theatre cast |
|---|---|---|---|---|---|
| Emma | Rachael Wooding | Crystal Mosser | Rebecca Faulkenberry | Lucie Jones | Lucie Jones |
| Ashley | Ashleigh Gray | Deone Zanotto | Tracy McDowell | Sarah French-Ellis | Georgina Hagen |
| Luke | Oliver Tompsett | Charlie Levy | Charlie Levy | Jack Shalloo | Jake Small |
| Charlie | Carl Mullaney | Mig Ayesa | Mig Ayesa | Mig Ayesa | Ross William Wild |

== Productions ==
=== Song Cycle workshops and off-West End showcase ===
Like Me (as a song cycle) had its first staged reading at the Arts Theatre, London in November 2013. A further 3-night showcase version was performed in January 2014 at The Duplex, New York starring Crystal Mosser as Emma and Mig Ayesa as Charlie with a single performance at the CMO Club, Conrad Hilton for the Innovation & Inspiration Summit in February, 2014. The full-book musical version was showcased at the Courtyard Theatre, London in October 2014 and later showcased at The Waterloo East Theatre in April 2015.

=== Current licensing ===
Licensing and performance rights for Like me are currently being held by L&S Productions, the production arm of writers Garry Lake and Jon Smith.

== Recordings and adaptations ==
=== Audio recordings ===
A number of songs from Like Me have been released as singles on Apple iTunes including "'Fore I Cry" sung by Louise Dearman.
