= Close Personal Friends =

- Directed by: Jason Orley
- Screenplay by: Isaac Aptaker
- Story by: Isaac Aptaker; Jason Orley
- Produced by: Isaac Aptaker; Elizabeth Berger; Ashley Fox; Johnny Pariseau
- Starring: Brie Larson; Lily Collins; Jack Quaid; Henry Golding; Melissa Villaseñor; Natasia Demetriou; Patti Harrison
- Cinematography: Erik Wilson
- Production companies: Maximum Effort; Walk-Up Company
- Distributed by: Amazon MGM Studios
- Country: United States
- Language: English

Close Personal Friends is an upcoming American comedy film directed by Jason Orley and written by Isaac Aptaker. It stars Brie Larson, Lily Collins, Jack Quaid, Henry Golding, Melissa Villaseñor, Natasia Demetriou, and Patti Harrison.

== Premise ==
A couple's chance encounter with a celebrity couple results in awkwardness.

== Cast ==
- Brie Larson
- Lily Collins
- Jack Quaid
- Henry Golding
- Anna Konkle
- Melissa Villaseñor
- Natasia Demetriou
- Jack Shalloo
- Patti Harrison
- Dustin Demri-Burns
- Meghan, Duchess of Sussex as herself
- April Bowlby

== Production ==
It was announced in August 2025 that Brie Larson, Lily Collins, Jack Quaid and Henry Golding were cast to star in the film. Anna Konkle, Melissa Villaseñor, Natasia Demetriou, Jack Shalloo, Patti Harrison, and Dustin Demri-Burns joined the cast in October. Meghan, Duchess of Sussex joined the cast after an 8 year hiatus from acting a month later, for a reported small cameo.

=== Filming ===
Principal photography began on September 30, 2025, in London and Los Angeles.
