= Jambo (The Adventure song) =

Official song of the 21st World Scout Jamboree

- Website; Jambo - Official Site

Jambo is the official song of the 21st World Scout Jamboree. It was sung by The Adventure (comprising Explorer Scouts Pete, Lucie, Nick and Caz) with support vocals provided by Beavers, Cubs and Scouts from around the UK. It was written by Al Steele and Nigel Hart. It was released in the UK on 2 July 2007 and charted at #91 on the UK Singles Chart. The title comes from "Jambo!" a greeting in the Swahili language.

Band member Lucie Jones, in 2009 got through to the UK X-Factor Live Finals. She was also selected to represent the United Kingdom in the Eurovision Song Contest in 2017.

== Track listing ==
1. Jambo - Original Version
2. Jambo - The Krys Randle Remix
3. Jambo - The French Version
4. One World, One Promise
5. Jambo - The Karaoke Version

The single also included the official Jambo video.
