= David Hunter (actor) =

British actor and singer

- Education: Liverpool Institute for Performing Arts
- Occupations: Actor and singer
- Years active: 2011–present

David Hunter is a British actor and singer best known for his work in musical theatre. He is originally from Warrington. Hunter played Doctor Pomatter in the Tony Award-winning musical Waitress at the Adelphi Theatre, West End, from 2019 to 2020. He trained at the Liverpool Institute for Performing Arts (LIPA).

Hunter was married to actor and business owner Tara Dixon, and together they have two children.

== Stage career ==
In 2011, Hunter was part of the original cast of One Man, Two Guvnors at the Royal National Theatre, subsequently transferring to the Adelphi Theatre in the West End.

In 2013, he went on to appear in the musical adaptation of The Hired Man at the Colchester Mercury and Leicester Curve.

In May 2014, he took over the role of "Guy" in the West End production of Once, having previously understudied the role.

In August 2016, he replaced Killian Donnelly in the role of Charlie Price in the West End production of Kinky Boots at the Adelphi Theatre.

In 2019, Hunter joined the original West End cast of Waitress, again at the Adelphi Theatre, in the role of Doctor Pomatter. He was then cast to reprise his role for the 2022-23 UK National Tour.

Hunter starred as Henry in The Time Traveller's Wife at the Apollo Theatre in 2022 - 2023, reprising the role he starred in at Storyhouse theatre in Chester in 2022.

In 2025 Hunter joined the cast of the musical adaptation of 13 Going on 30 in the lead role of Matt. The show played at Manchester Opera House and was directed by Andy Fickman. Cast included Lucie Jones as Jenna and Grace Mouat as Lucy. After its UK premiere the musical moved to Toronto for a North American premiere.

Hunter was part of the cast of the UK premiere of the musical Beetlejuice at the Prince Edward Theatre in London as Adam Maitland. Cast included David Fynn in the titular role, Hannah Nordberg as Lydia, Chelsea Halfpenny as Barbara Maitland, Aimie Atkinson as Delia Schlimmer and Alasdair Harvey as Charles Deetz.

== Filmography ==
=== Film and television ===
Year	Title	Role	Notes
2014	Nativity 3: Dude, Where's My Donkey?	Mr Parker	
2020	Holby City	Patient	
2021	Doctors	Bill Anderson	2 episodes

=== Stage ===
Year	Title	Role	Theatre	Location
2011	One Man, Two Guvnors	Ensemble	Royal National Theatre	London
2012	Seussical	Horton	Arts Theatre	West End
2012	The Mayor of Zalamea	The Mayor	Liverpool Everyman	Liverpool
2013	The Hired Man	Isaac	Leicester Curve	Leicester
2014–15	Once	Guy	Phoenix Theatre	West End
2015-16	The Who's Tommy	Captain Walker	Prince Edward Theatre	West End
2016–17	Kinky Boots	Charlie Price	Adelphi Theatre	West End
2019–20	Waitress	Doctor Pomatter	Adelphi Theatre	West End
2022	Waitress	Doctor Pomatter	UK National Tour	
2022	The Time Traveller’s Wife	Henry	Storyhouse	Chester
2022–2023	The Time Traveller’s Wife	Henry	Apollo Theatre	West End
2025	13 Going on 30	Matt Flamhaff	Manchester Opera House	Manchester
2026	Beautiful Little Fool	F. Scott Fitzgerald	Southwark Playhouse	World premiere
2026	Beetlejuice	Adam Maitland	Prince Edward Theatre	London

== Superstar ==
Hunter took part in the UK TV series Superstar in an attempt to win the role of rock opera Jesus Christ in a new arena production of Jesus Christ Superstar. He was chosen as one of the eleven finalists on the show in which began in July 2012. He made it to the semi-finals where he was eliminated on 24 July 2012.

=== Performances on Superstar ===
Show	Song	Original Artist	Result	Bottom Two Performance
Night One	"Forget You"	CeeLo Green	Safe	—N/a
Night Two	"Nothing's Real But Love"	Rebecca Ferguson	Safe	—N/a
Night Three	"You've Got The Love"	Candi Staton	Bottom Two	"The Long and Winding Road" (The Beatles)
Night Four	"One Day Like This"	Elbow	Safe	—N/a
Night Five	"Nothing Compares 2 U"	The Family	Safe	—N/a
Night Six	"Apologize"	OneRepublic	Safe	—N/a
Night Seven	"Too Close"	Alex Clare	Safe	—N/a
Night Eight (semi-final)	"I Try"	Macy Gray	Bottom Two	"No Matter What" (Whistle Down the Wind)
