= Blowing Whistles =

Blowing Whistles is a 2005 British two-act theatrical play written by Matthew Todd, the former editor of the UK's best selling gay magazine Attitude. It centers on gay culture and the difficulties it presents gay men. It had a first run in June 2005 at the Warehouse Theatre, Croydon, where it was directed by Phil Willmott. Following this it was performed at Sound Theatre off Leicester Square, London in 2006, and has since seen productions in Sydney, Melbourne, Adelaide, Fire Island (New York), Boston, Palm Springs, Fort Lauderdale, San Francisco, Toronto and Vancouver.

It returned to London transferring to the Leicester Square Theatre in 2008 in a production by Jonathan Altaras, directed by Pete Nettell who directed the Sydney production. It received overwhelmingly positive notices from such diverse publications as the gay press through to the right wing Spectator. The London Evening Standard compared it to Henrik Ibsen's A Doll's House, and The Stage compared it to the work of Larry Kramer.

Discussion for 2010 included an Australian and UK tour with a possible return to Sydney and London.

The play was also performed at the Manchester Pride Fringe Festival 2011 by local Manchester theatre company Laced Banana to rave reviews. With Nigel played by Ben Rigby, Jamie by Haydn Holden and Mark by Robert Feldman. Directed by Amy Derber.

== Plot ==
The play follows three gay men, two in a relationship and one whom the couple meet through the gay on-line dating site Gaydar. Some issues the characters go through include commitment, immaturity, gay relationships and sexual identity.

The play is widely recognised as giving the illusion of being a light gay comedy in the first act before taking a darker, powerful turn in the second.
