= The Time Traveller's Wife (musical) =

2022 musical

- Artwork for the West End production
- Music: Joss Stone; Dave Stewart; Nick Finlow (additional)
- Lyrics: Joss Stone; Dave Stewart; Kait Kerrigan (additional)
- Book: Lauren Gunderson
- Basis: The Time Traveler's Wife by Audrey Niffenegger; 2009 film by Bruce Joel Rubin
- Productions: 2022 Chester; 2023 West End

The Time Traveller's Wife is a stage musical with a book by Lauren Gunderson and music and lyrics by Joss Stone and Dave Stewart (with additional lyrics by Kait Kerrigan and additional music by Nick Finlow), based on the novel by Audrey Niffenegger and the 2009 film.

== Background ==
A stage musical based on the book was announced to be in development in March 2021, which was due to premiere in the UK in late 2021 or early 2022. The musical is titled The Time Traveller's Wife and features a book by Lauren Gunderson music and lyrics by Joss Stone and Dave Stewart with additional lyrics by Kait Kerrigan. The production is directed by Bill Buckhurst and produced by Colin Ingram for InTheatre Productions by special arrangement with Warner Bros. Theatre Ventures.

In response to the announcement, Niffeneger revealed on Twitter she did not know about the project and then clarified that the theatrical rights belonged to Warner Bros.

== Production history ==
=== Chester (2022) ===
The stage musical premiered at Storyhouse in Chester running from 30 September to 15 October 2022. The production was directed by Bill Buckhurst and designed by Anna Fleischle, with choreography by Shelley Maxwell, lighting design by Lucy Carter, illusions by Chris Fisher, video design by Andrzej Goulding, sound design by Richard Brooker, musical supervision & arrangement by Nick Finlow and orchestrations by Bryan Crook.

The cast included David Hunter as Henry with Joanna Woodward as Clare.

=== West End (2023) ===
On 8 February 2023, it was announced that the production will transfer to the Apollo Theatre in London's West End. The show began previews from 7 October 2023 with opening night planned for 1 November 2023. Hunter and Woodward reprise their roles as Henry and Clare. Dawes, Elchikhe, and Mahendran also returned as Henry's Dad, Charisse, and Gomez respectively. Originally scheduled to run until 30 March 2024, it was announced that the show will close on 24 February 2024.

== Musical Numbers ==
Act I

- Prologue - Henry, Clare and Company
- "Masterpiece" - Clare and Company
- "Wait for Me" - Henry and Company
- "One Day" - Clare, Young Clare and Company
- "Damn Fool Love" - Gomez and Company
- "I See Her" - Henry, Henry's Dad and Company
- "Who We Are" - Henry, Clare, Gomez, Charisse, Henry's Dad and Company

Act II

- Entr'acte
- "Journeyman" - Henry and Company
- "This Time" - Clare and Company
- "A Woman's Intuition" - Gomez, Charisse and Company
- "I'm in Control" - Clare and Company
- "Make It New" - Henry, Clare, Alba and Company
- "On and On" - Henry, Clare and Company
- "Love Wins the Day" - Henry, Clare, Gomez, Charisse, Henry's Dad, Alba and Company

== Cast and characters ==
| Characters | Chester | West End |
| Characters | 2022 | 2023 |
|---|---|---|
| Henry | David Hunter | David Hunter |
| Clare | Joanna Woodward | Joanna Woodward |
| Dr Kendrick | Aisha Davis | Helena Pipe |
| Henry's Dad | Ross Dawes | Ross Dawes |
| Charisse | Hiba Elchikhe | Hiba Elchikhe |
| Clare's Dad | Stevie Hutchinson | Irfan Damani |
| Gomez | Tim Mahendran | Tim Mahendran |
| Henry's Mum | Sorelle Marsh | Sorelle Marsh |
| Jason / Mark | Benjamin Purkiss | Alex Lodge |
| Old Clare | Alwyne Taylor | Alwyne Taylor |
| Young Clare/Alba | Eva Johnson; Eve Corbishley; Phoebe Cheffings | Ava Critchell; Lily Hanna; Poppy Pawson; Holly-Jade Roberts |

== Awards and nominations ==
| Year | Award | Category | Nominee | Result |
|---|---|---|---|---|
| 2024 | WhatsOnStage Awards | Best New Musical | | Nominated |
| 2024 | WhatsOnStage Awards | Best Lighting Design | Rory Beaton & Lucy Carter | Nominated |
| 2024 | WhatsOnStage Awards | Best Video Design | Andrzej Goulding | Nominated |
