= 21st World Scout Jamboree =

World Scout Jamboree in 2007

- Location: Hylands Park, Chelmsford, Essex
- Country: United Kingdom
- Coordinates: 51°42′41″N 0°26′10″E
- Date: 27 July 2007 to 8 August 2007
- Attendance: 38,074
Previous; 20th World Scout Jamboree	Next; 22nd World Scout Jamboree
- Website http://eng.thejamboree.org/

The 21st World Scout Jamboree was held in July and August 2007 and formed a part of the Scouting 2007 Centenary celebrations of the world Scout Movement. The event was hosted by the United Kingdom, as 2007 marked the 100th anniversary of the founding of Scouting on Brownsea Island.

The event was held for 12 days between 27 July and 8 August, in Hylands Park, Chelmsford, Essex. This site was selected because of the easy access to air and sea transport, and it is also near Gilwell Park, an important campsite and training centre for Scout Leaders.

Over 38,000 Scouts and leaders from 158 countries which have a recognised National Scout Organization (recognition is conferred by membership in the World Organization of the Scout Movement) camped for the event, while over 50,000 others attended for day visits. There were also over 8600 members of the International Service Team who also came from all over the world.

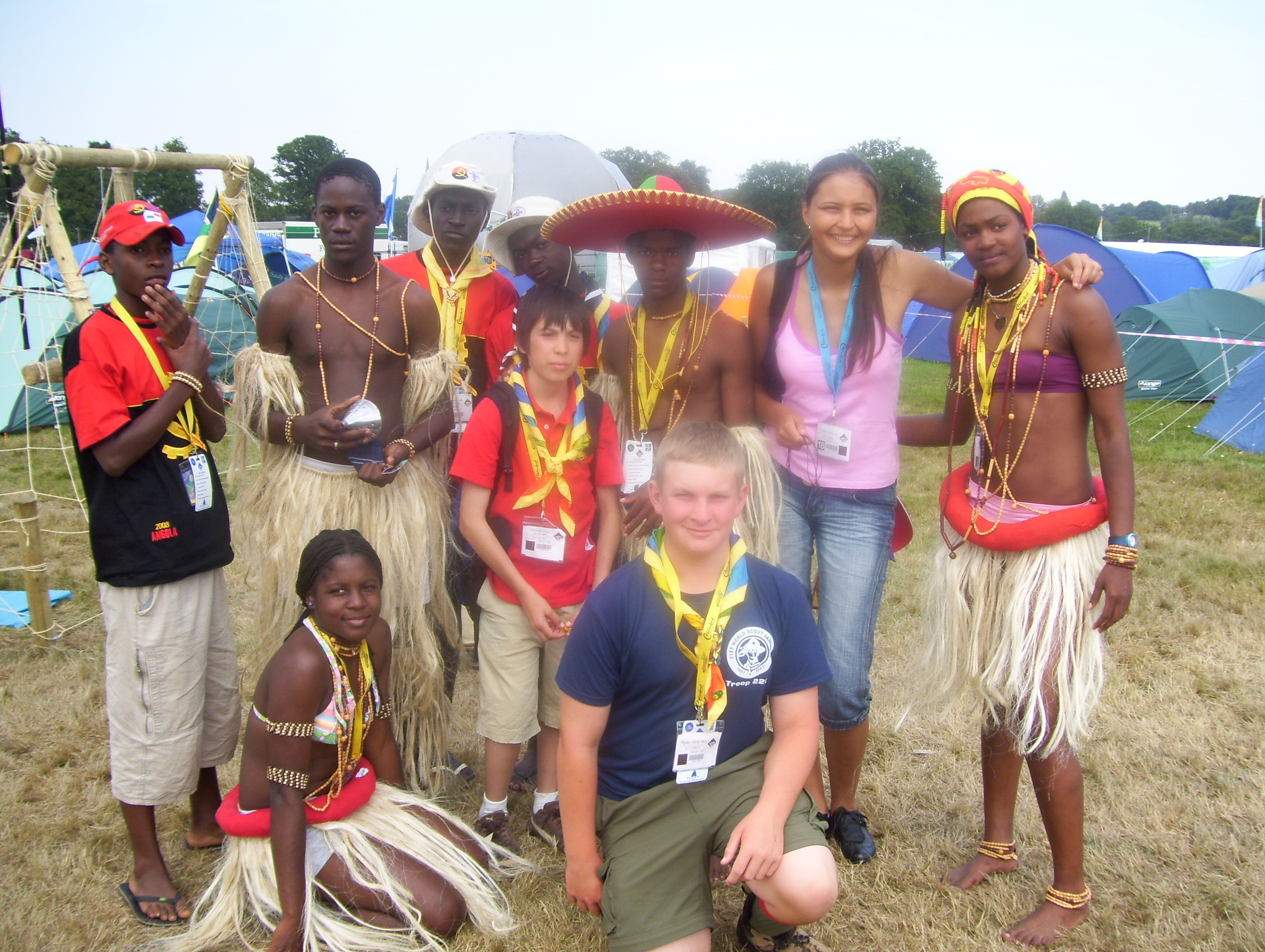
Scouts from around the world at the 21st World Jamboree

== Participation ==
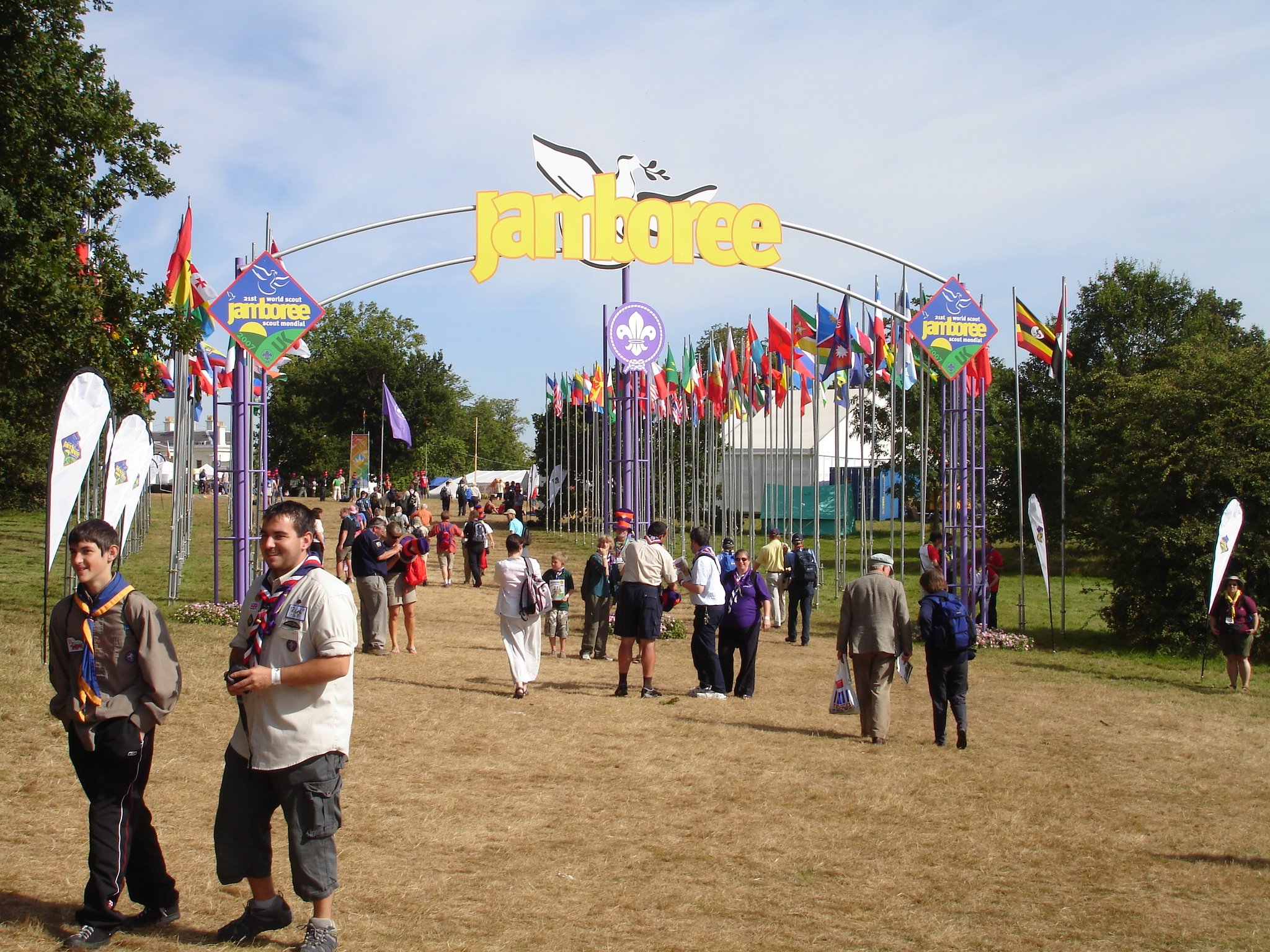
The main entrance to the 21st World Scout Jamboree

The event was open to all members of the World Organization of the Scout Movement (WOSM) who were between the ages of 14 and 17 at the start of the Jamboree on July 27, 2007. Members of the World Association of Girl Guides and Girl Scouts (WAGGGS) may have participated if the respective national WOSM member organization agreed. People who wished to attend must have been selected by their respective Scouting associations.

Adults were able to participate in support roles as members of the International Service Team, National Contingent Support Teams, Troop Leaders, National Representatives, Off-Site Program Workers, or members of the Build Team.

Day visitors of all ages were also welcomed to the event. However, the dates and the areas on which day visitors were able to visit were restricted to maintain park capacity limits.

The event was the second largest ever Jamboree held with 38,074 participants and IST attending, but with more countries than ever before., and more than 42,000 day visitors. The 3rd 'Coming of Age' Jamboree in 1929 was the largest held, with 50,000 participants.

Several scouts from island nation Sri Lanka also participated in this event including scouts from Trinity College Kandy namely R. Tammita, Sanjaya Marambe, Rohan Jayarathne, Yohan Fernando.

== Theme ==
Centenary celebration badge, which could be worn on the uniforms of all active Scouts around the world

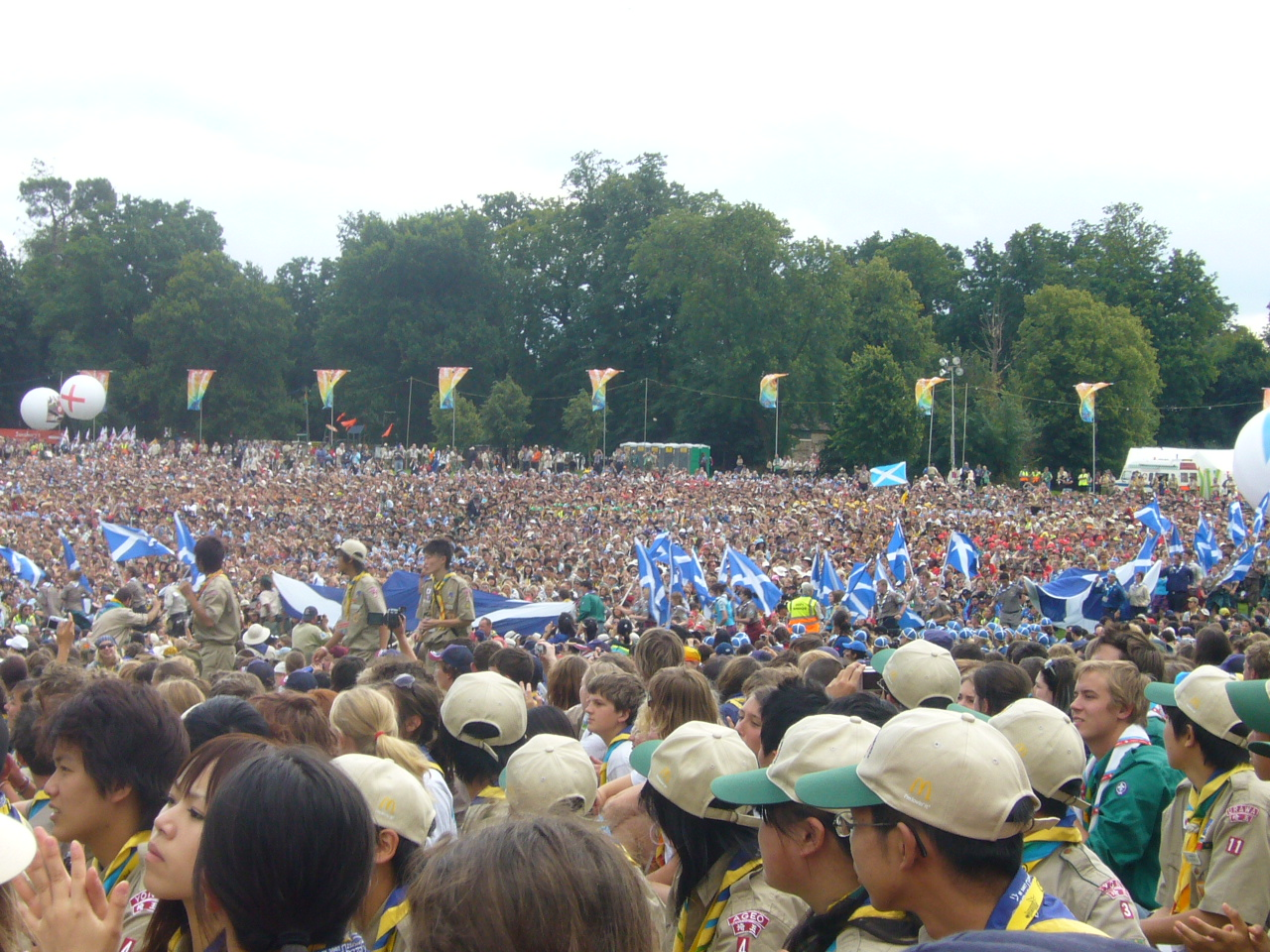
Opening ceremony at Hylands Park

Each Jamboree has a theme, and the 2007 Jamboree's is "One World, One Promise". This motto is incorporated on the Centenary badge and is available in the local language of all Scouting organisations who are members of the World Organization of the Scout Movement. This motto is also included in the lyrics of the Jambo Song

=== Factfile ===
- Between midnight on Thursday 26 and midnight on Friday 27 one coach arrived at Hylands Park every two minutes on average.
- One roll of toilet paper was used up every minute.
- Over 5 km of fibre Optic cable and over 45 km of Category 5 cable was used in the IT systems.
- More countries took part in the 21st World Scout Jamboree than in the most recent Olympic Games.
- Over 100,000 kg of meat was eaten during the course of the event.
- Approximately 90 tankers of toiletry waste were taken away from the site every day.
- Several activities in the 21st World Scout Jamboree attempted to break a Guinness World Record, this includes successfully launching 1032 model rockets at the same time, taking 500 kayaks into the water on the opening day and 384 pairs dancing a Polish national dance. Nevertheless, on 7 August 2007 at 19:30, Scouting was officially declared and certified by Scott Christie, record manager of the Guinness Book of World Records, as the largest youth organisation in the world.

== Attractions ==
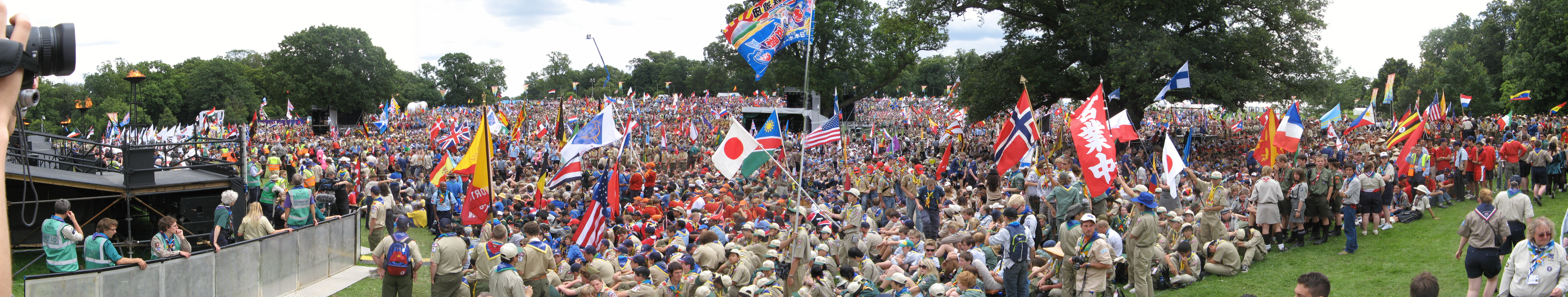
Scouts at the opening ceremony

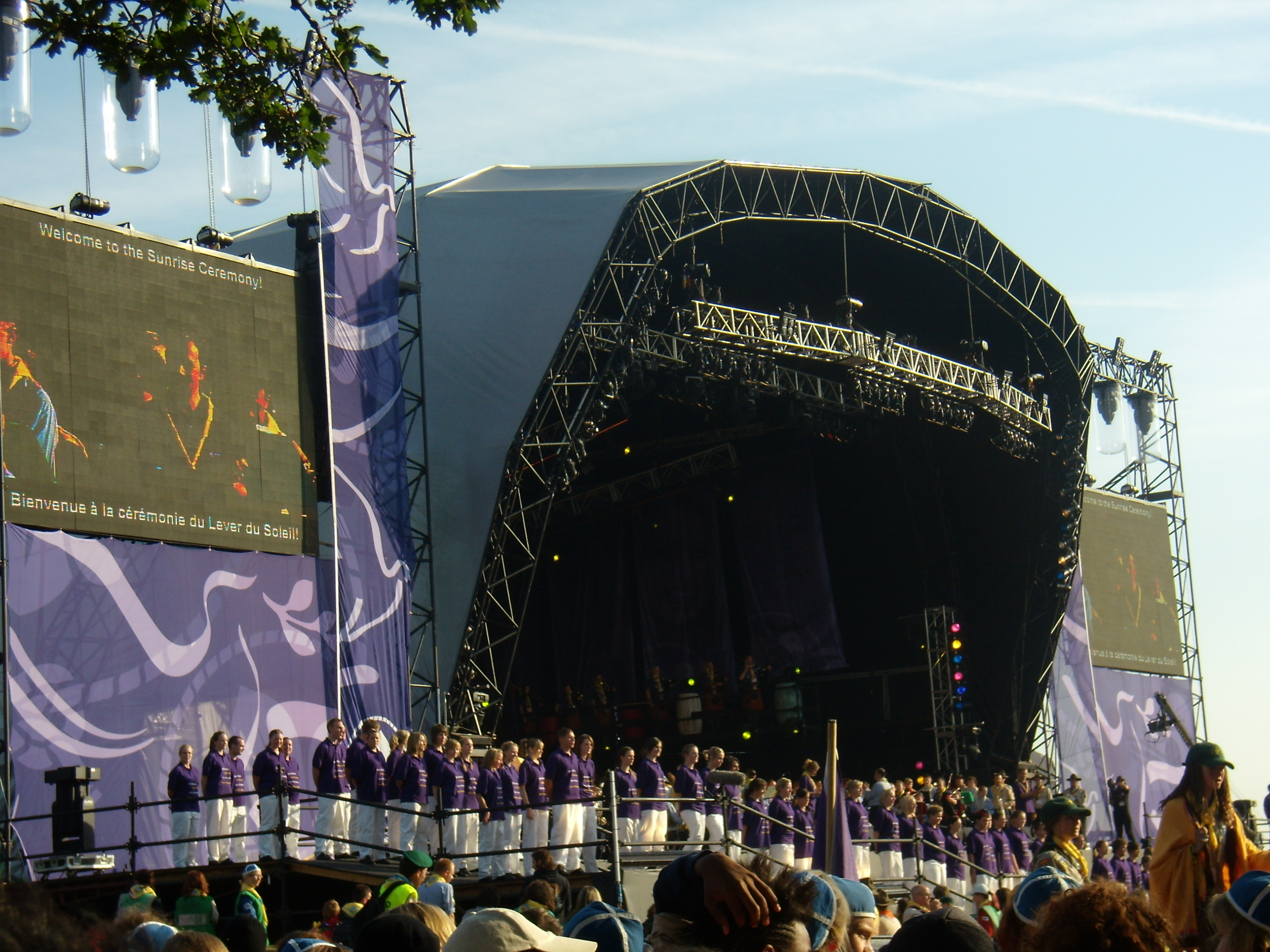
Celebrations at the sunrise ceremony

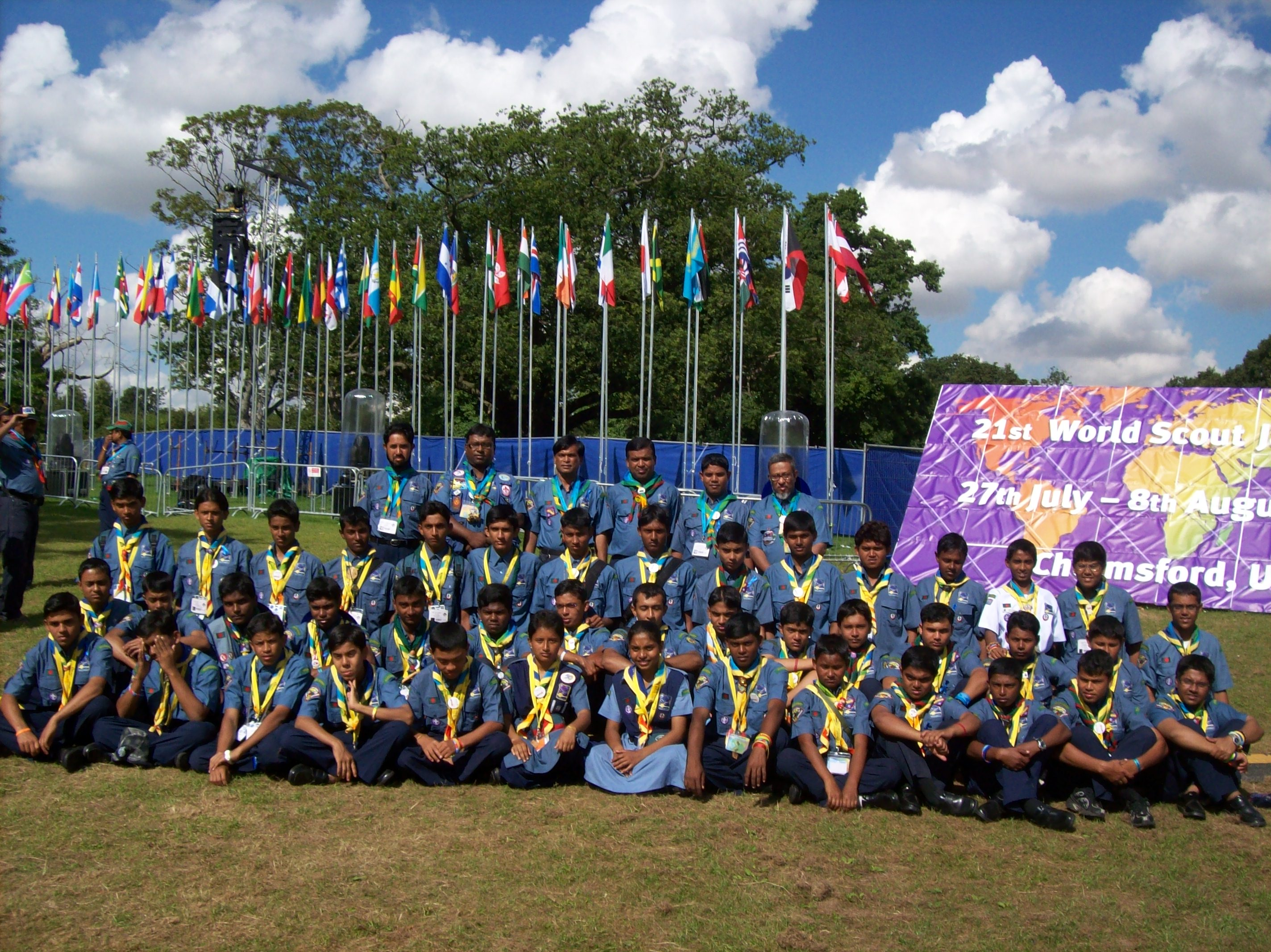
Bangladesh Scouts contingent at the 21st World Scout Jamboree

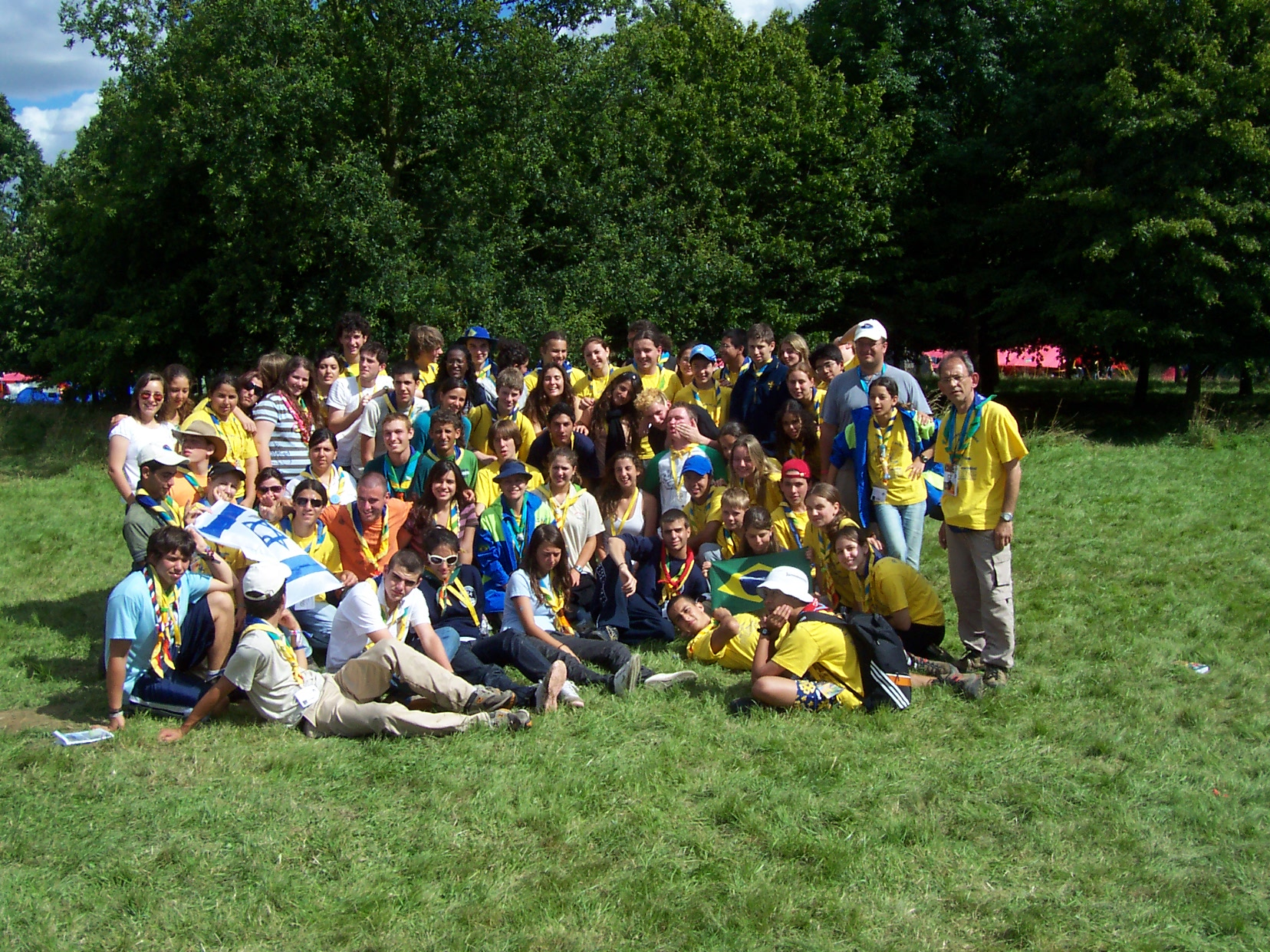
Israel and Brazil contingents at the Jamboree

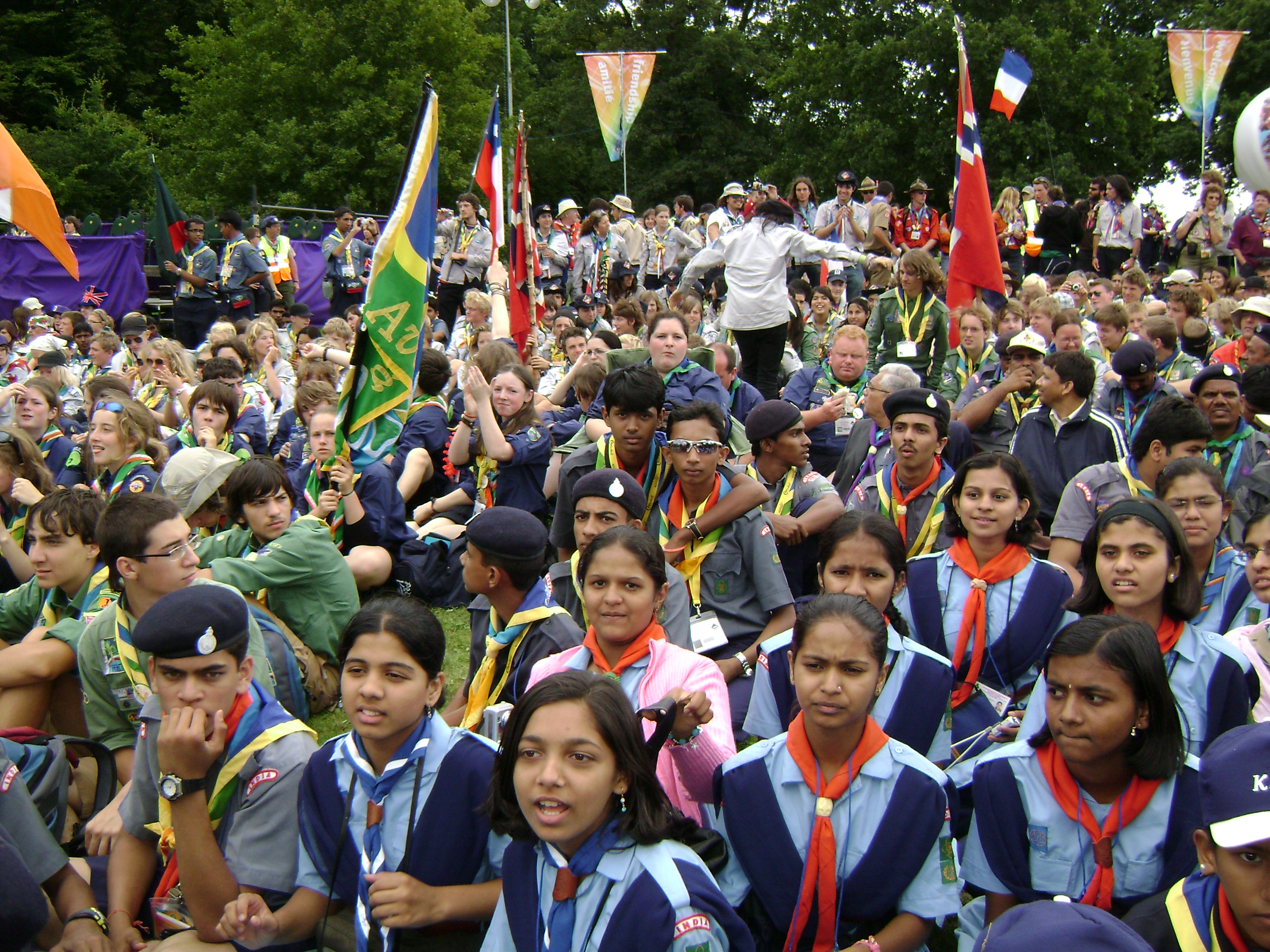
India Scouts and Guides contingent at the 21st World Scout Jamboree

Key attractions, events and facilitions included:

- Opening ceremony: The camp was called to order in a special ceremony. Prince William and Duke of Kent (President of the UK Scout Association) attended and participated representing the Queen.
- World Village: Six areas on the Jamboree site where Scouts could experience things like creativity, technology, and culture.
- Gilwell Adventure: Adventurous and challenging activities were provided at Gilwell Park, the UK Scouting Headquarters.
- Global Development Village: An exhibition that explored the world's key challenges through practical workshops run by specialists from the United Nations and similar organizations and charities like Oxfam.
- Globuses were a series of London buses transformed to be a learning base. They featured topics on slavery, women's rights, children's rights, global travel, HIV/AIDS and water. A particularly famous bus was the women's rights bus which had a previous role in Spice World.
- Community Action Day: Known officially as 'Starburst', a day that was devoted to making a difference in the community through involvement which included activities like clearing thorn bushes and trees at Epping Forest and redecorating a children's home.
- Daily Shows: Performed by the World Scout Jamboree cast from the UK, a group of Scouts and Guides who had auditioned to perform. There were a range of songs being performed, including a unique 'Jamboree Megamix', a song comprising favorite pop hits, as well as the official Jamboree Song.
- Sunrise Ceremony: This event marked the 100 years of Scouting; all of the Scouts joined together to re-take their promise via a live video link to Brownsea Island, where the first Scout Camp took place. The cast also provided entertainment during and after this early morning event. Similar events occurred at 8 am local time, August 1, all over the world. The Hon. Michael Baden-Powell, grandson of the founder of the Scout Movement, was also present; and he read out excerpts from letter that his grandfather wrote before his death. "I believe that God put us in this jolly world to be happy and enjoy life. Happiness doesn't come from being rich, nor merely from being successful in your career, nor by self-indulgence. One step towards happiness is to make yourself healthy and strong while you are a boy, so that you can be useful and so can enjoy life when you are a man...But the real way to get happiness is by giving out happiness to other people. Try and leave this world a little better than you found it and when your turn comes to die, you can die happy in feeling that at any rate you have not wasted your time but have done your best. "Be Prepared" in this way, to live happy and to die happy—stick to your Scout promise always—even after you have ceased to be a boy—and God help you to do it. Your Friend Baden-Powell"
- Sunrise camp: Each participating country should nominate 2 members to the Sunrise Camp, 27 July to 1 August.They will be divided into 4 patrols and enjoy a series of activities at Brownsea Island, including help prepare and participate in the sunrise ceremony.
- Adult Jamboree Friendship Award is introduced for International Service Team members and Adult Leaders.
- Internet Cafes and WiFi hotspots.

== Subcamps ==
Each hub contained four subcamps each consisting of 2,000 Scouts with its own programme of activities. Within the subcamps each troop had 36 participants. The four hubs were:

- Tropical
  - Jungle
  - Lagoon
  - Mangrove
  - Rain forest
- Ocean
  - Beach
  - Harbour
  - Fjord
  - Atoll
- Desert
  - Oasis
  - Dune
  - Wadi
  - Tundra
- Mountain
  - Volcano
  - Plateau
  - Glacier
  - Canyon

The adult-only hub for IST members and other adults not affiliated with a Sub-camp or participant unit and has own programme of activities at first time:

- Island

== Preparations ==
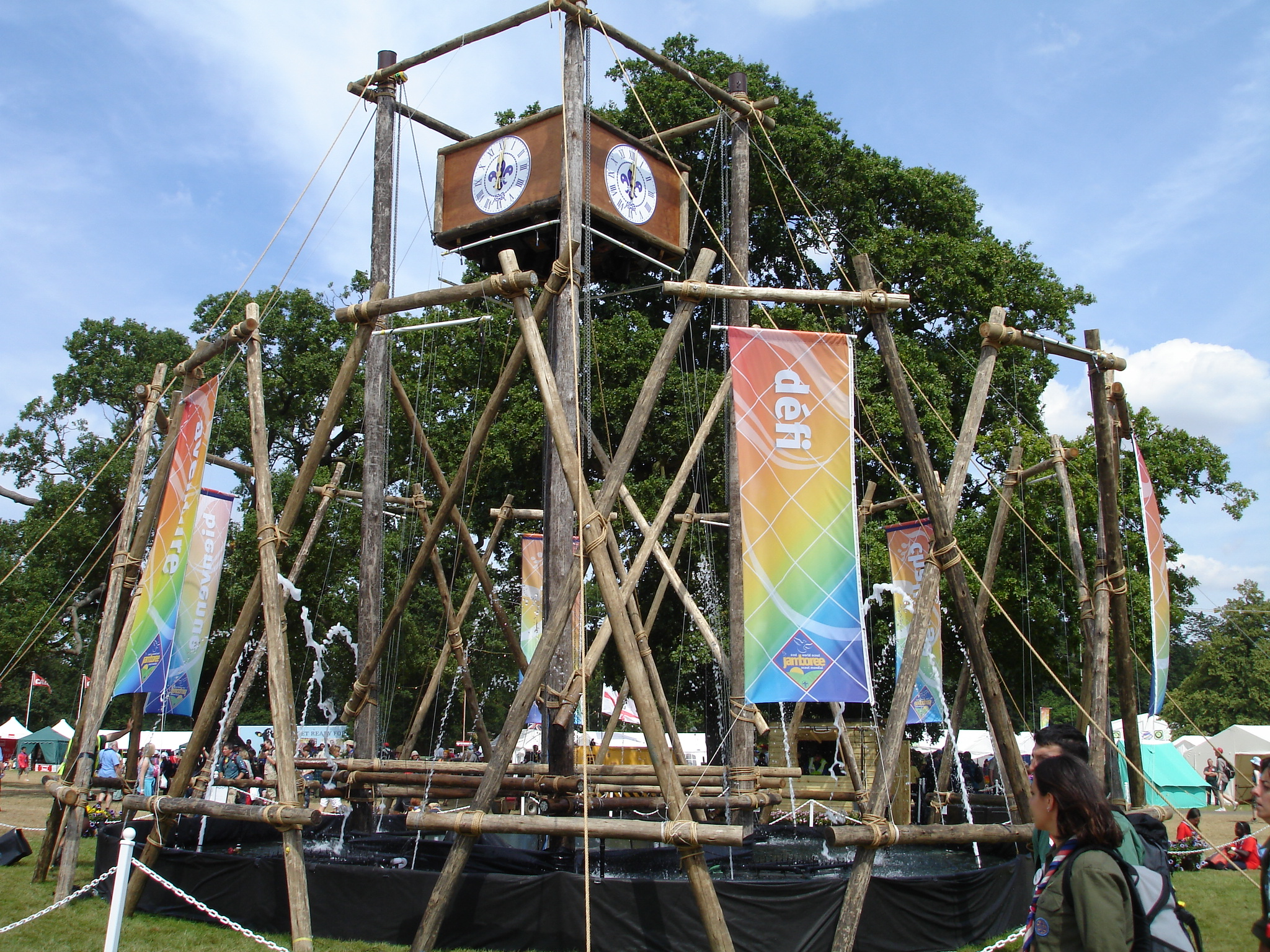
The central clock built from pioneering poles

Preparations for the event have included a smaller scale Jamboree, EuroJam 2005, where 12,000 Scouts, from across Europe, camped in the same location. This dry run allowed the planners of the Jamboree to test a number of aspects of the event, including the control of the massive influx of the contingents into the area. The food and supplies for the EuroJam event also set a world record for the largest single internet order to a supermarket, with deliveries being made in large articulated trucks.

Scouts Shops Ltd, responsible for sourcing much of the equipment for the 21st World Jamboree, reported that the cost of steel on the world market increased as a result of the Jamboree placing its order.

=== International Service Team ===
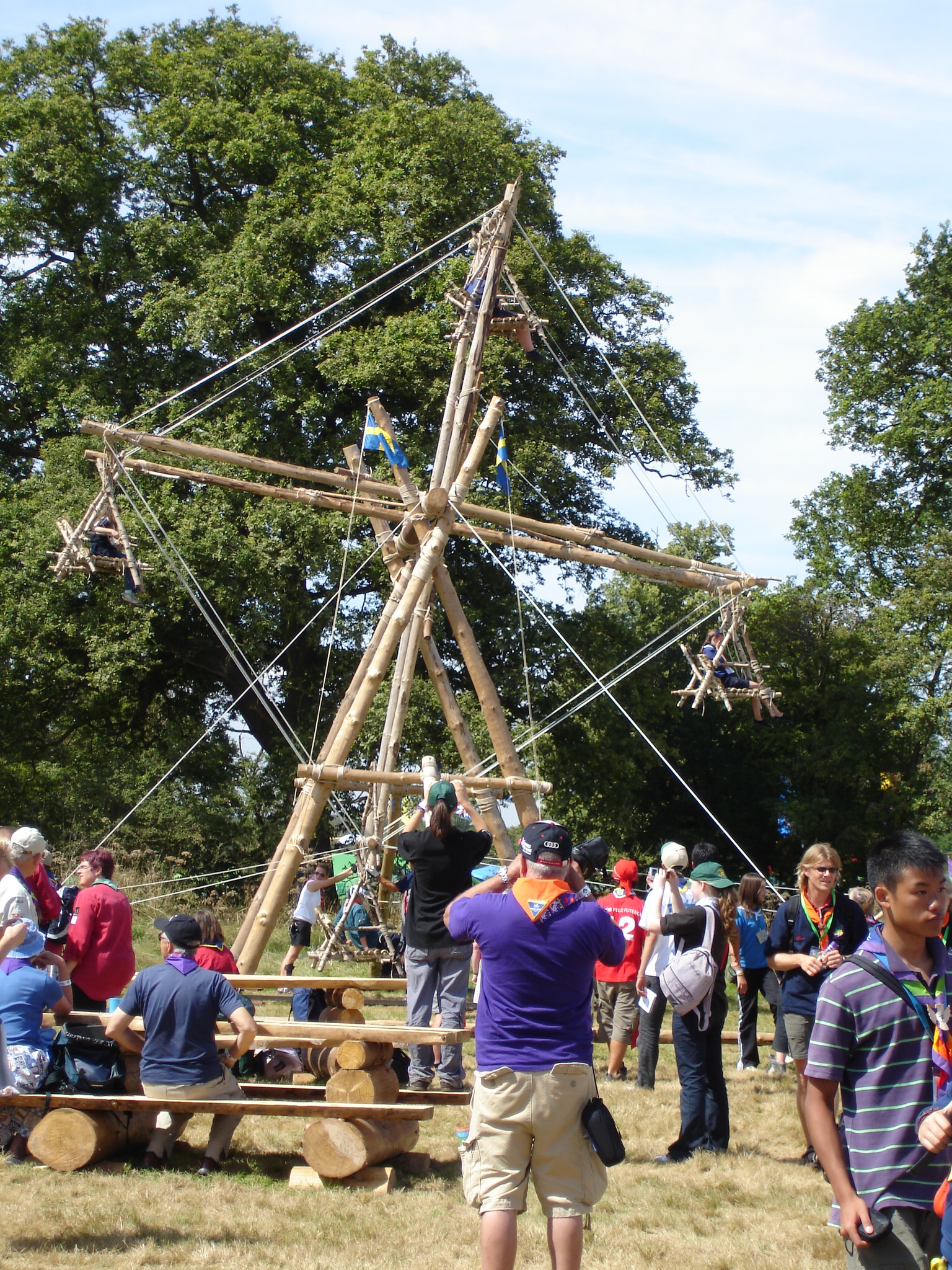
A Ferris wheel built by the Swedish contingent

The International Service Team (IST) were Scouts aged 18 and above who help to build large-scale Scouting events, the most notable being World Scout Jamborees. They arrived one week before the beginning of the actual event for preparation.

There were over 8,600 members of the IST at the 21st World Scout Jamboree, and they helped to build, run, take down and maintain the events, activities and services on the Jamboree site. The IST were split into two main sections, with four sub-sections, depending on their interests and qualifications:

- On-Site IST looked after on-site services, events and activities.
- Off-Site IST looked after Splash!, the water activities day, Gilwell Adventure, activities at the home of Scouting, and Starburst, the community projects day.

Including water, gas and electricity, the IST built and maintained the fifth largest city in Essex from a park in under a month.

== UK Contingent Pre-Event Party ==
The entire UK contingent arrived one day before the rest of the world, and had a party on the Tropical Hub stage with performances from Liberty X and Lemar, along with Radio 1 DJ Jason King and CBBC TV presenter Anne Foy. Peter Duncan, UK Chief Scout, was also on the stage.

== Controversy ==
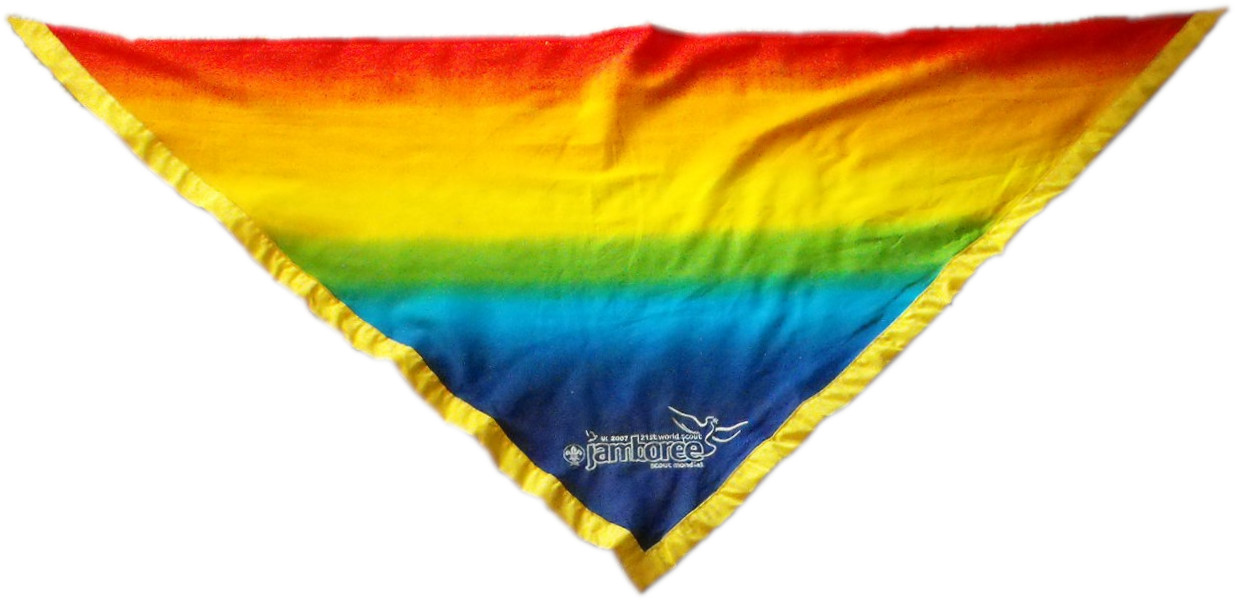
21st World Scout Jamboree neckerchief

After the Jamboree closed, it was revealed that thirteen Scouts had been reported missing to the British Police. All the organisations involved maintain there has been no crime committed, as all the Scouts had visas, and were only concerned for the Scouts' safety.

Concerns were raised by local people in Chelmsford after Hylands Park hosted the Jamboree and V Festival 2007 just a week apart, causing disruption to local roads and exacerbating the negative effects on the park found after hosting the annual music festival.

== See also ==
- Jambo (song)
- Jamboree
- World Scout Jamboree
