= Alex Young (actor) =

English stage actress (born 1984)

- Born: 20 June 1984 (age 42); United Kingdom
- Education: King's College London (Bach. of Music); Royal Academy of Music (PGD)
- Occupation: Stage actress
- Employer: Operation Mincemeat
- Children: 1

Alex Young (born 20 June 1984) is a stage actress from Northampton, England.

== Early life and education ==
Young attended King's College London, where she studied Music and graduated in 2005. She earned a post graduate diploma from the Royal Academy of Music, where she won the 2010 Stephen Sondheim Student Performer of the Year Award.

== Personal life ==
Young has a daughter, with whom she was pregnant during her productions of Guys and Dolls and Coriolanus.

== Theatre Career ==
Year	Title	Role	Venue	Notes
2013	High Society	Liz Imbrie	UK Tour	
2014	I Can't Sing! The X-Factor Musical	Brunhilde, Ensemble	London Palladium	
2015	Anything Goes	Erma	Sheffield Crucible	
2016	Showboat	Ellie May Chipley	Gillian Lynne Theatre	
2017	Promises, Promises	Margie	Southwark Playhouse	
2017	Carousel	Carrie	London Coliseum	
2017	Follies	Young Sally	National Theatre	
2018	Me and My Girl	Sally Smith	Chichester Festival Theatre	
2019	Standing at the Sky's Edge	Poppy	Sheffield Crucible (March-April 2019)	
2019	Guys and Dolls	Sarah Brown	Sheffield Crucible	
2020	Coriolanus	Brutus	Sheffield Crucible	
2021	South Pacific	Nellie Forbush	Chichester Festival Theatre	
2022	She Loves Me	Amalia Balash	Sheffield Crucible	
2022	Anyone Can Whistle	Mayoress Cora Hoover Hooper	Southwark Playhouse	
2022	Into the Woods	Baker's Wife	Theatre Royal	
2022	Standing at the Sky's Edge	Poppy	Sheffield Crucible (December 2022-January 2023) National Theatre (February-March 2023)	
2023	Cold War	Irena	Almeida Theatre	
2024	Stranger Things: The First Shadow	Virginia Creel	Phoenix Theatre	
2025-2026	Operation Mincemeat	Ewen Montagu & Others	Fortune Theatre	
2026	Fun Home	Helen	Royal Exchange Theatre, Manchester	

== Accolades ==
Year	Award	Category	Work	Result	Ref.
2026	WhatsOnStage Award	Best Takeover Performance	Operation Mincemeat	Nominated	
