= Harvey Evans =

American theater actor (1938–2021)

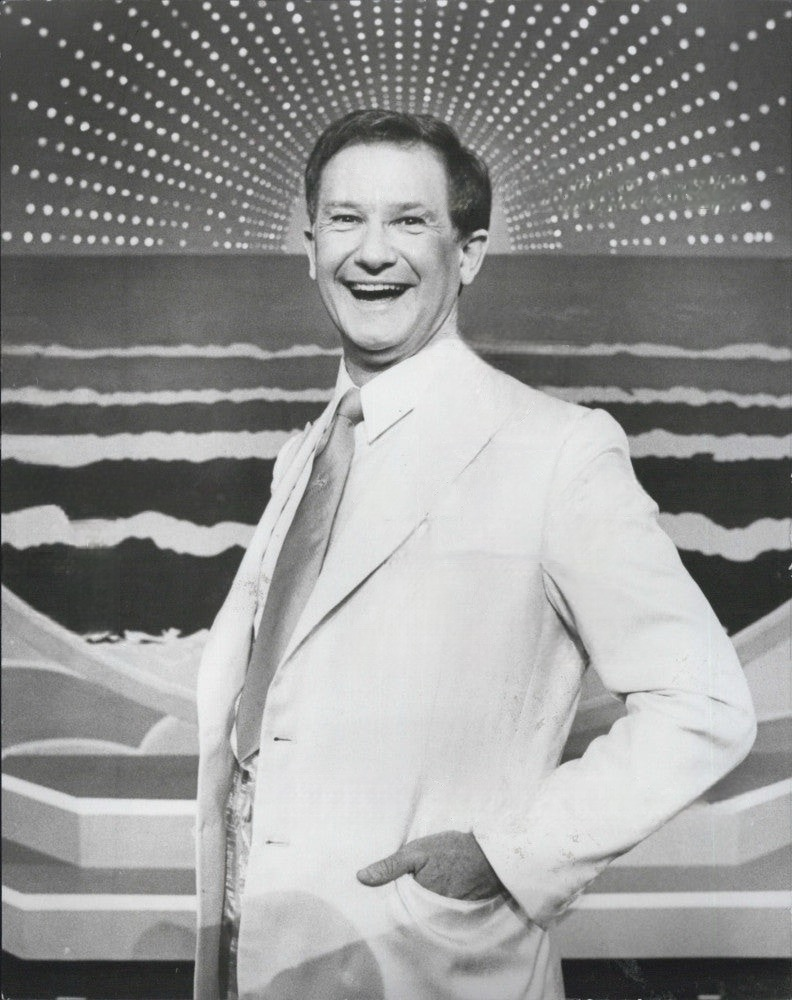
- Evans in 1984
- Born: Harvey Hohnecker; January 7, 1941; Cincinnati, Ohio, U.S.
- Died: December 24, 2021 (aged 80); Englewood, New Jersey, U.S.
- Occupations: Actor, singer, dancer
- Years active: 1955–2011

Harvey Evans (January 7, 1941 – December 24, 2021) was an American stage and film actor, singer and dancer who appeared in the original Broadway productions of West Side Story, Hello, Dolly!, and Follies, and among others.

== Life and career ==
Evans was born Harvey Hohnecker and grew up in Cincinnati. He moved to New York in 1955.

Soon after Evans moved to New York, he appeared in the national tour of Damn Yankees, where he met Bob Fosse. Fosse then cast the young Evans in his first Broadway production, New Girl in Town (1957). Evans next appeared on the original Broadway production of West Side Story as Gee-Tar (1957). He later appeared in both film versions of the musical. He played Mouthpiece, one of the Jets, in the 1961 film and played a security guard at Gimbels in Steven Spielberg’s 2021 remake. He appeared in another Fosse musical, Redhead (1959).

He next appeared on Broadway in Gypsy as replacement for Tulsa (1960) and then was a replacement for Barnaby in the original Broadway run of Hello, Dolly! (from 1967), where he appeared alongside Carol Channing, Betty Grable, and Eve Arden. Other Broadway appearances included roles in Anyone Can Whistle (1964), George M! as Sam Harris (1968), Our Town as George Gibbs (1969), The Boy Friend as Bobby Van Husen (1970), Follies as Young Buddy (1971), Barnum understudying the title role (1980), Sunset Boulevard as Jonesy, Sammy and other roles (1995), The Scarlet Pimpernel as Ozzy (1998) and Oklahoma! understudying Andrew Carnes (2002).

Evans was a chimney sweep in the 1964 film version of Mary Poppins. He also appeared in The Pajama Game and had a cameo in the 2007 film Enchanted. He played William in Silver Tongues.

He died at the Actors Fund Home in Englewood, New Jersey, on December 24, 2021, at the age of 80.
