= BBC Northamptonshire =

The BBC Northamptonshire website, launched on 2 April 2002, was the latest in a series of county and city "where I Live" websites launched by the BBC in England.

The original concept was to provide a website for 18- to 35-year-olds with an emphasis on encouraging users to send in their own articles, photos, audio and video.

Original sections included: News, Sport, Weather, Travel, Going Out, Interactive, Features, A Sense Of Place and Webcams.

As of December 2005, the main sections were: News, Sport, Junior Football, Travel, Weather, Entertainment, Messageboard, About Northants, In Pictures, Webcams, Features, Faith, Students, Creative Northants and a link to BBC Local Radio (Radio Northampton).

The website is put together by a team of three based in the BBC building on Abington Street, Northampton. The original team of Martin Borley, Jon Raitt and Iain Griffin were still there as of December 2005.

The News coverage is supplied by a team of BBC journalists in Norwich. Sport is prepared locally but often links to content provided by BBC Sport Online. The Weather and Travel pages are supplied by central BBC departments.
