= Lost Boy (musical) =

2013 musical by Phil Willmott

Lost Boy is a 2013 musical by Phil Willmott. The plot follows the characters of the original 1904 play Peter Pan as young adults on the eve of the First World War.

== Production ==
The show premiered at Finborough Theatre on 31 December 2013, and ran until 11 January 2014. It was directed by Phil Willmott and choreographed by Racky Plews, with music provided the three onstage musicians. The show then transferred to Charing Cross Theatre, where it opened on 13 January 2014, and ran until 29 March.

== Premise ==
Captain George Llewellyn Davies, dreaming while near a battlefield in the midst of the First World War, dreams of the Peter Pan characters.

Now in 1914, Peter Pan has returned to England to rejoin Wendy. He becomes a soldier, quickly rising through the ranks. Meanwhile, Tinkerbell, who has been rejected by Peter, frequents the brothels and opium dens of the East End, while Tiger Lily is a Parisian trouper.

Wendy's brother, Michael, has become a trapeze artist struggling with the stigma surrounding his homosexuality. John, the youngest sibling, has become a psychiatrist.

== Reception ==
The show was criticized for its density, but its cast were generally praised for their performances, as was the choreography, lighting, and set design. The show's humor was also noted positively.
