= Lucie Jones =

Welsh singer and actress

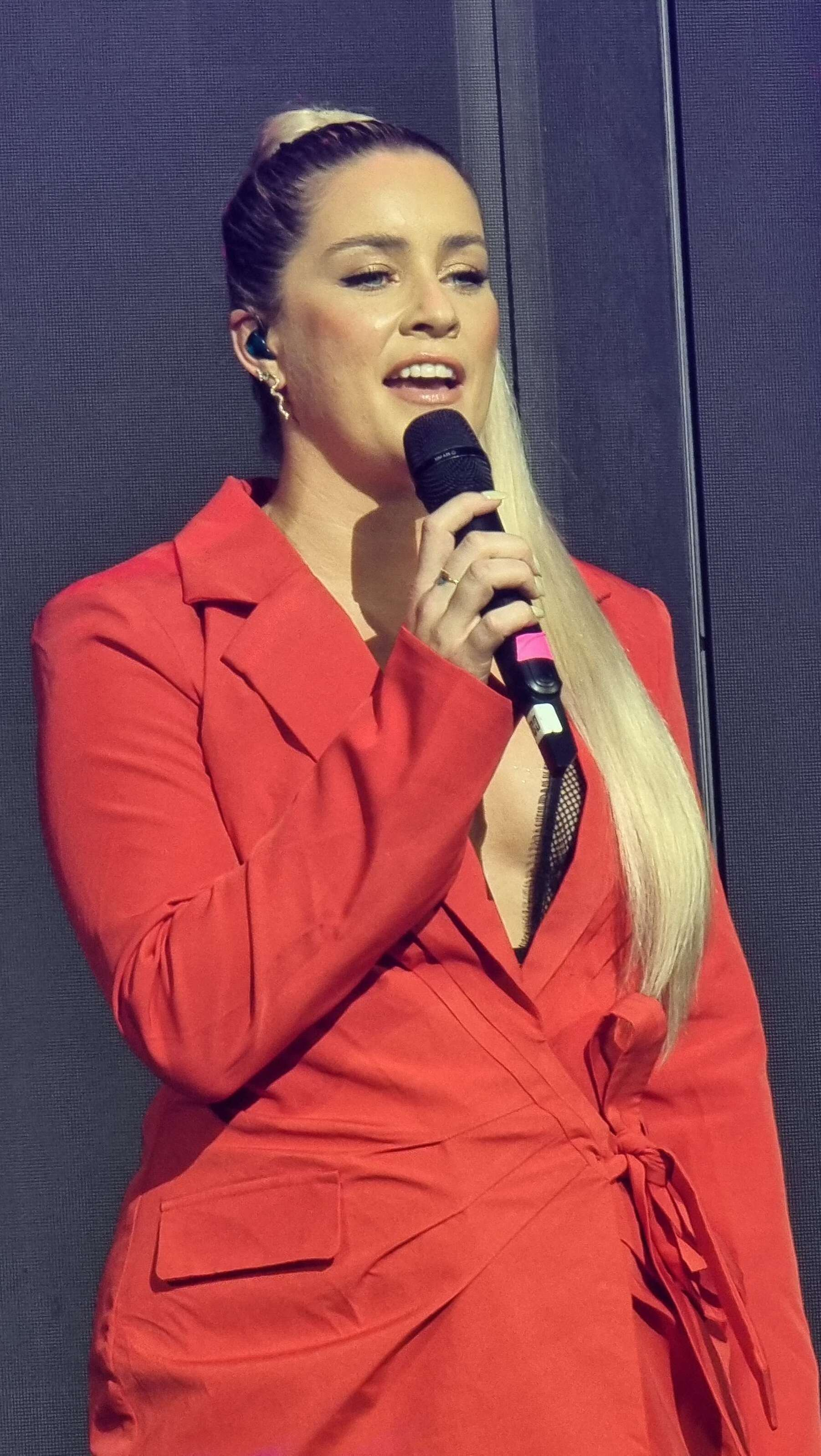
- Jones in 2024

Background information
- Born: Lucie Bethan Jones; 20 March 1991 (age 35); Pentyrch, Cardiff, Wales
- Genres: Pop; show tunes
- Occupations: Singer; actress; model
- Instrument: Vocals
- Years active: 2007–present

Lucie Bethan Jones (born 20 March 1991) is a Welsh singer, actress and model. Jones first came to prominence while competing on series 6 of The X Factor UK in 2009, where she was the fifth contestant eliminated during the live shows. She represented the United Kingdom in the Eurovision Song Contest 2017 with the song "Never Give Up on You", finishing with 111 points in 15th place. She’s also performed in musical theatre, most notably starring in Les Misérables and Waitress.

== Life and career ==
Jones was born in Pentyrch, a small village outside Cardiff. In 2007, she attended the World Scout Jamboree as a Scout, and was the main performer singing "Jambo", the theme song of the jamboree. Lucie was also a part of Cardiff's own Scout and Guide Gang Show.

=== The X Factor ===
Jones auditioned for series 6 of The X Factor UK with the song "I Will Always Love You". She advanced to the live shows, and was mentored by Dannii Minogue. Jones was eliminated in week five, during the final showdown against John & Edward after the result went to deadlock with Louis Walsh and Simon Cowell voting to eliminate Jones while Minogue and Cheryl Cole voted to send home John & Edward. After her elimination, 1,113 viewers complained about Cowell sending the result to deadlock rather than sending home John & Edward in a majority vote.

The X Factor performances and results
Show	Song choice	Theme	Result
Audition	"I Will Always Love You"	—N/a	Through to bootcamp
Bootcamp (Part 1)	"Hero"	—N/a	Through to the next day of bootcamp
Bootcamp (Part 2)	"Hurt"	—N/a	Through to judges' houses
Judges' houses	"Anything for You"	—N/a	Through to live shows
Live show 1	"Footprints in the Sand"	Musical heroes	Safe (4th)
Live show 2	"How Will I Know"	Divas	Safe (6th)
Live show 3	"My Funny Valentine"	Big band	Safe (3rd)
Live show 4	"Sweet Child o' Mine"	Rock	Safe (7th)
Live show 5	"This Is Me"	Songs from films	Bottom two (8th)
Live show 5	"One Moment in Time"	Sing-Off	Eliminated (8th)

=== West End ===
After being eliminated from The X Factor, Jones was signed to Select Model Management, and began a modelling career. In May 2010, Jones was signed by Cameron Mackintosh to play Cosette in the West End production of Les Misérables. In September 2010, she was revealed to be the face of Wonderbra's Full Effects campaign. In 2010, she appeared in The Sarah Jane Adventures episode, "Lost in Time: Part Two". Jones played the role of Meat in the 2013 arena tour of We Will Rock You. Jones also played the role of Victoria in the musical American Psycho at the Almeida Theatre in December 2013.

In February 2015, Jones appeared as Melody Carver in ITV's Midsomer Murders, in the episode "The Ballad of Midsomer County". In April 2015, Jones played the role of Emma in the showcase performance of Like Me, at The Waterloo East Theatre. In March 2015, she was cast as Molly in the Chinese tour of Ghost the Musical. In April 2016, she played the lead role of Elle Woods in Legally Blonde at the Curve. In 2016, she was cast as Maureen Johnson in the UK tour of Rent. Jones appeared in a summer run as Holly in the UK Tour of The Wedding Singer from 20 June to 19 July 2017. Between September 2017 and June 2018, she reprised her role as Elle Woods in a UK tour of Legally Blonde.

=== Eurovision Song Contest 2017 ===
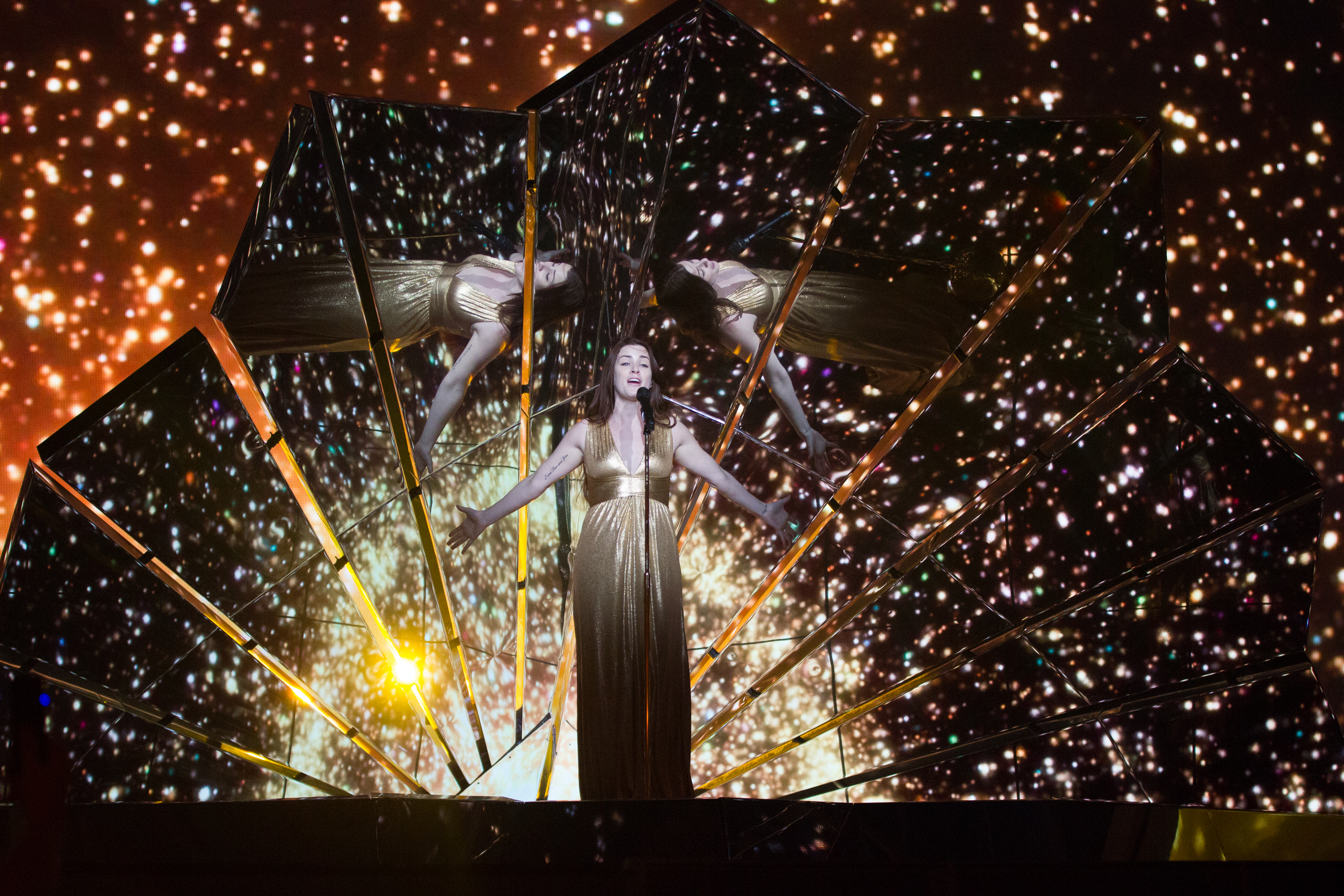
Jones performs at the Grand Final of the Eurovision Song Contest 2017.

In January 2017, Jones competed in Eurovision: You Decide, the United Kingdom's national final for the Eurovision Song Contest 2017. Her song, "Never Give Up on You", was co-written by Eurovision Song Contest 2013 winner Emmelie de Forest. On 27 January 2017, Jones won the televised show, and was confirmed to be representing the United Kingdom in the Eurovision Song Contest 2017, in Kyiv.

Jones's performance was shown in excerpt at the contest's first semi-final and, following this, betting odds went on to surge. At the Grand Final Jones performed eighteenth in the running order and went on to score 111 points through combined voting from the jury and public. Jones also managed to score 12 points from Australia's professional jury. An article in the International Business Times stated that she blamed Brexit for the "disappointing" result though Jones said in a televised interview with the BBC that she had noticed no effect from Brexit in the attitude towards her from fellow contestants and fans of the show.

=== Return to musical theatre ===
Jones made her debut as Jenna in Waitress on 17 June 2019, taking over from Katharine McPhee. For 2 weeks from 13 January 2020, she was briefly replaced by Desi Oakley (who had played Jenna in the US tour) due to an illness that also affected her two understudies. From 27 January to 21 March 2020, the role was to be played by Sara Bareilles for an 8-week run, with Jones stepping back into the role until the show closed on 4 July 2020. However, on 14 March 2020, the show closed early due to the COVID-19 pandemic. Jones reprised the role of Jenna on 4 September 2021 for the rescheduled UK & Ireland tour (originally set to start November 2020).

Prior to the pandemic, Jones performed her first solo concert on 16 February 2020 at The Adelphi Theatre. A live album "Lucie Jones: Live at the Adelphi" was released on 25 September 2020.

In Summer 2021, Jones took on the role of Fantine in the West End production of Les Misérables, ending on 29 August 2021 so that she could resume her role as Jenna in Waitress for the 2021/2022 UK Tour, starting on 4 September 2021.

Jones made her debut as Elphaba in Wicked at London's Apollo Victoria Theatre on 1 February 2022. She concluded her run in the show on 4 March 2023, and reprised the role of Fantine in the West End production of Les Miserables on 27 March 2023, taking over the role from Ava Brennan. She was then succeeded by Katie Hall on 25 September. From April 29-30th 2024, Jones played role of Catherine in the 50th anniversary London concert production of Pippin.In the summer of 2024, she played the lead role of Genevieve in the musical The Baker's Wife at The Menier Chocolate Factory in London.

After a first workshop in October 2023 at the Battersea Arts Centre, Jones starred as Jenna Rink in the premiere of the musical 13 Going on 30, which ran from 21 September 2025 to 13 October 2025 at Manchester Opera House. The show is based on the movie of the same title and directed by Andy Fickman. Fellow cast members include Grace Mouat as Lucy and David Hunter as Matt.

Lucie Jones completed a National tour with The Fulltone Orchestra in April and May 2023. In May 2024, Jones performed a solo concert at Cadogan Hall, with guest appearances from Alfie Boe and notably, Eurovision's Sam Ryder. Similarly, in December 2024 and 2025, she carried out an annual Christmas concert at The Gate Arts Centre in Cardiff, Wales.

On 16 February 2026, Jones performed her largest sold-out solo show at The London Palladium.

== Works and performances ==
=== Discography ===
==== Albums ====
Title	Details
Lucie Jones: Live at the Adelphi	Released: 25 September 2020; Format: Digital download; Label: Live Here Now

==== Extended plays ====
Title	Details
Believe	Released: 15 October 2015; Format: Digital download; Label: Jones Entertainment

==== Singles ====
Single	Year	Peak chart positions		Album
Single	Year	UK	SCO	Album
"You'll Never Walk Alone" (with Rhys Meirion)	2013	–	—	Cerddwn ymlaen
"Confidence Is Conscienceless"	2015	–	—	Confidence Is Conscienceless
"The Ballad of Midsomer County"	2015	–	—	Midsomer Murders (Original Television Soundtrack)
"Never Give Up on You"	2017	73	29	Non-album single
"—" denotes a single that did not chart or was not released in that territory.

=== Television ===
Year	Title	Role	Notes
2009	The X Factor	Herself	Contestant
2010	The Sarah Jane Adventures	Gemma	Television series; 2 episodes
2010	Les Misérables in Concert: The 25th Anniversary	Turning Woman 2	Television movie
2013	Miss Todd	Miss Todd	Short film
2015	Midsomer Murders	Melody Carver	TV series, S17E3: "The Ballad of Midsomer County"
2017	Eurovision: You Decide 2017	Herself	Contestant
2017	Eurovision Song Contest 2017	Herself	United Kingdom representative
2018	Eurovision: You Decide 2018	Herself	Guest
2024	BBC Proms	Soloist	Episode: "Doctor Who at the Proms"

=== Theatre ===
Year	Title	Role	Theatre	Location
2010–11	Les Misérables	Cosette		UK National Tour
2011	The Prodigals	Kelly	Edinburgh Fringe Festival	Edinburgh
2013	We Will Rock You	Meat	—N/a	UK Arena Tour
2013–14	American Psycho	Victoria/Hardbody Bartender	Almeida Theatre	Off West End
2015	Broadway to the Bay	Featured Soloist	Millennium Centre	Cardiff
2015	Like Me	Emma	Waterloo East Theatre	Off West End
2015	Ghost the Musical	Molly Jensen	—N/a	China National Tour
2016	Legally Blonde	Elle Woods	Curve, Leicester	Leicester
2016	Musicals Unsung	Featured Soloist	The Other Palace	Off West End
2016–17	Rent	Maureen Johnson	—N/a	UK National Tour
2017	The Wedding Singer	Holly	—N/a	UK National Tour
2017–18	Legally Blonde	Elle Woods	—N/a	UK National Tour
2017	A Christmas Carol	Emily/Ghost of Christmas Future	Old Vic	Off West End
2019–20	Waitress	Jenna Hunterson	Adelphi Theatre	West End
2020	Lucie Jones - Live at the Adelphi	Herself	Adelphi Theatre	West End
2020–21	A Christmas Carol	The Ghost of Christmas Past	Dominion Theatre	West End
2021	Treason the Musical	Martha Percy	Cadogan Hall	London
2021	Les Misérables	Fantine	Sondheim Theatre	West End
2021	Waitress	Jenna Hunterson	—N/a	UK National Tour
2022–23	Wicked	Elphaba	Apollo Victoria Theatre	West End
2023	Les Misérables	Fantine	Sondheim Theatre	West End
2024	The Baker's Wife	Genevieve	Menier Chocolate Factory	Off West End
2024	Ghost In Concert	Molly	Adelphi Theatre	West End
2024	Pippin	Catherine	Theatre Royal, Drury Lane	West End
2024–25	Les Misérables	Fantine	Sondheim Theatre	West End
2025	Austenland	Jane	Savoy Theatre	West End
2025	Les Misérables	Fantine	Various	World Concert Tour
2025	13 Going on 30	Jenna Rink	Manchester Opera House	Manchester
2026	Les Misérables	Fantine	Sondheim Theatre	West End
2026	Waitress	Jenna Hunterson	—N/a	UK National Tour

Preceded by Joe and Jake with "You're Not Alone"	United Kingdom in the Eurovision Song Contest; 2017	Succeeded by SuRie with "Storm"
