= 13 Going on 30 (musical) =

Musical composed by Alan Zachary and Michael Weiner

- Music: Alan Zachary; Michael Weiner
- Lyrics: Alan Zachary; Michael Weiner
- Book: Cathy Yuspa; Josh Goldsmith
- Setting: New York
- Basis: 13 Going on 30
- Premiere: 21 September 2025: Manchester Opera House, Manchester
- Productions: 2025 Manchester

13 Going on 30 is a musical based on the 2004 film, with book by Josh Goldsmith and Cathy Yuspa, and songs by Alan Zachary and Michael Weiner.

Directed by Andy Fickman, the world premiere production of 13 Going on 30 opened in Manchester at the Manchester Opera House in September 2025. Jennifer Garner, who starred as Jenna in the original film, serves as executive producer of the musical.

== Synopsis ==
Jenna is an awkward 13-year-old and, after being humiliated at her birthday party by the Six Chicks, in hope to escape the misery of middle school, makes a wish to be 30 years old. She awakens the next day just five days before her 30th birthday, with no idea how this happened.

Jenna has become one of the best editors at Poise, her favorite magazine, but she finds out that she has lost all her childhood friends and became part of the Six Chicks herself. As Jenna discovers which type of person she has become, she discovers what and especially who really matters in her life.

== Productions ==
On 28 September 2023, it was announced that a musical stage adaptation of the film would premiere in the UK. The musical held several public workshop performances at Battersea Arts Centre in London in 2023, ahead of a full production opening in 2025. The book of 13 Going on 30 is written by movie writers Josh Goldsmith and Cathy Yuspa, and the songs are by composer/lyricists Alan Zachary and Michael Weiner. Casting for the workshops was announced on 12 October 2023, with Lucie Jones playing Jenna Rink, Jamie Muscato playing Matt Flamhaff, and Grace Mouat playing Lucy Wyman, with Andy Fickman directing.

The stage adaptation had its world premiere at the Manchester Opera House from 21 September 2025 through 12 October 2025. The cast included Jones as Jenna, David Hunter as Matt and Grace Mouat as Lucy. The producers for the show included ROYO, Revolution Studios, Wendy Federman, and Phil Kenny. Jennifer Garner, who starred as Jenna in the movie, was executive producer. Andy Fickman returned as director.

In early 2026 it was announced that the show would play in Toronto in November 2026 for a North American premiere, as part of the Mirvish season. The full cast was revealed in September 2026, with Lucie Jones and Grace Mouat reprising their roles as Jenna and Lucy respectively and Dom Simpson joining them as Matt.

== Cast and characters ==
Character	Battersea Arts Centre workshop	Manchester Opera House	Princess of Wales Theatre
Character	2023	2025	2026/2027
Jenna Rink	Lucie Jones	Lucie Jones	Lucie Jones
Matt Flamhaff	Jamie Muscato	David Hunter	Dom Simpson
Lucy Wyman	Grace Mouat	Grace Mouat	Grace Mouat
Richard	Caleb Roberts	Caleb Roberts	Caleb Roberts
Kyle Grandy	Andrew Berlin	Andrew Berlin	Andrew Berlin
Alex	Alex Stoll	Dominic Andersen	Alex Tranter
Wayne	Lewis Asquith	Ross Dawes	Morgan Scott
Bev	Mary-Jean Caldwell	Suzie McAdam	Katharine Pearson
Darius Mark	Iván Fernández González	Iván Fernández González	Iván Fernández González
Wendy	-	Jenna Innes	Amy Webb
Paige	-	Rose Galbraith	Rose Mary O'Reilly

== Musical numbers ==
Act 1:

- "Wanna Be" - Young Jenna, Company
- "I Know You" - Young Jenna, Young Matt
- "Get Out Of This Town" - Young Jenna
- "Poise" - Lucy, Jenna, Company
- "The Intercom Song" - Jenna
- "Everything" - Jenna
- "Trust" - Matt
- "13 Going On 30" - Jenna, Lucy, Ensemble
- "Hot" - Six Chicks
- "You Gotta Have Fireworks" - Jenna, Matt
- "Too Late" - Jenna, Matt, Young Jenna, Young Matt

Act 2:

- "Peaked In High School'" - Kyle
- "That Moment In Time" - Jenna
- "Poise (reprise)" - Lucy
- "Own It" - Jenna
- "Why Can't We Fly" - Jenna, Matt
- "Own It (reprise)" - Jenna
- "Lucy's Presentation" - Lucy
- "Make the World" - Jenna
- "I Know You (reprise)" - Jenna, Matt
- "Here And Now" - Jenna, Matt, Young Jenna, Young Matt, Company

== Awards and nominations ==
Year	Award	Category	Nominee	Result
2026	WhatsOnStage Awards	Best Regional Production		Won
2026	WhatsOnStage Awards	Best Performer in a Musical	Lucie Jones	Nominated
2026	WhatsOnStage Awards	Best Supporting Performer in a Musical	Grace Mouat	Nominated
2026	WhatsOnStage Awards	Best Choreography	Jennifer Weber	Nominated
