= Phil Willmott =

British director (born 1968)

Phil Willmott (born 26 January 1968) is a British director, playwright, arts journalist, teacher, and founder of London based theatre production company The Steam Industry.

He was the Artistic Director of the Finborough Theatre in London's Earl's Court from 1994 to 1999.

He is also the chief theatre reviewer for the British satirical radio series Mind The Gap, and was chief critic for the online ticketing agency London Box Office until 2020.

== Positions ==
He is the founding Artistic Director of his award-winning theatre company THE STEAM INDUSTRY incorporating The Finborough Theatre (under the Artistic Directorship of Neil McPherson) and London's annual Free Theatre Festival at the open-air "Scoop" amphitheatre on the South Bank.

He was an Associate Artist of London's acclaimed Battersea Arts Centre for ten years and has also been Associate Director of the Yvonne Arnaud Theatre in Guildford and Co-Director of the UK's leading degree course in Musical Theatre at Arts Educational Schools London where he was also Head of Acting.

== Awards ==
In 2009, he was awarded a prestigious TMA award for "Outstanding production of a musical" and nominated for the What's on Stage "Best Regional Theatre" prize for his musical Once Upon a Time at the Adelphi (Liverpool Playhouse).

In London he received a Peter Brook Award for his annual classical productions and family shows at the Scoop and numerous London Fringe Awards. In 2014 he was awarded the first ever Owle Schreame Award for innovation in historical theatre, for his production of The Ring Cycle Plays (again at the Scoop). He has also been the recipient of a Brooks Atkinson New Dramatists Award in New York.

== London theatre directing ==
In the West End, he directed the tenth-anniversary cast of Fame (The Aldwych Theatre) and Treasure Island (The Mermaid Theatre); A Midsummer Night's Dream in Dubai; Blowing Whistles (Croydon Warehouse Theatre and Sound Theatre, Leicester Square); You Don't Kiss (Stratford Circus); the DVD recording of rock musical Poe at the Abbey Road Studios and Liberace's Suit and I Love You You're Perfect, Now Change (Jermyn Street Theatre).

For his own company, The Steam Industry, award-winning productions of new writing have included The Fundraisers, Fucking Men, Watch Out for Mr Stork, Venetian Heat, Born Bad and The Oedipus Table, and classics such as Crime and Punishment, The Grapes of Wrath, Trelawny of the 'Wells' and Loyalties (all at the Finborough Theatre) and Blood Wedding, Helen of Troy, Disney's Jungle Book, Petite Rouge, The Caucasian Chalk Circle, The Cyclops, Children of Hercules, Treasure Island, Oedipus, Agamemnon, Androcles and the Lion, and The London Nativity at the Scoop.

His other notable Steam Industry productions include Joe DiPietro's play Fucking Men which transferred from the Finborough Theatre to a box office record-breaking run Off West End at The Kings Head; Victor/Victoria, The Resistible Rise of Arturo Ui (The Bridewell); Measure for Measure (Riverside Studios); Ring Round the Moon (King's Head); The Winter's Tale (The Courtyard Theatre); Titus Andronicus, Germaine Greer's Lysistrata, Murdered Sleep, Inherit the Wind, Seven Brides for Seven Brothers, The Sound of Music, The King and I, Calamity Jane and Sweet Charity (all at BAC where he was an associate artist); South Pacific, Joe Orton's Funeral Games and his own musical Dick Daredevil and play Venom (The Drill Hall); Joe Orton's Crimes of Passion and his own plays Stealing the Scene, Succulence and Mermaid Sandwich ; and radical Shakespeare adaptations The Wax King (from Henry VI parts 1, 2 & 3 ), Iago (from Othello) and Illyria (from Twelfth Night) at The Man in The Moon.

In 2013, Willmott directed the Modern World Premiere of Fair Em at the Union Theatre.

== Regional theatre directing ==
For Liverpool's Everyman and Playhouse theatres he has directed Much Ado About Nothing, Billy Liar, Athol Fugard's Master Harold and the Boys & his own musicals Once Upon a Time at the Adelphi (commissioned as a centrepiece to Liverpool's year as European City of Culture) & Around the World in Eighty Days (Liverpool Playhouse, UK tour and German tour).

Elsewhere regionally he has directed Rent (Olympia, Dublin); Pal Joey (The New Wolsey Theatre, Ipswich & Nottingham Playhouse); Beautiful and Damned (The Yvonne Arnaud Theatre, Guildford); Angels in America and Kiss of the Spider Woman (Sheffield Crucible).

== Family shows ==
Pantomime includes two productions of Lesley Joseph in Snow White and the Seven Dwarfs (Richmond Theatre and Theatre Royal, Newcastle for Qdos); Sleeping Beauty (Greenwich Theatre); his own versions of Snow White starring Toyah Willcox, Richard O'Brien, Warwick Davis and Suzanne Shaw (Milton Keynes Theatre for Ambassadors Theatre Group); Aladdin (The Corn Exchange, Newbury) and writing a new Pantomusical of Dick Whittington for Oxford Playhouse.

== Cabaret, concert and event directing ==
He has directed cabaret and concert tours of Four Poofs and A Piano and Nonsense, Children's Laureate Michael Rosen's collaboration with composer Colin Riley (The Royal Festival Hall). He devised and directed Ugly Bugs Ball with the BBC Big Band for the 2009 Olympic Launch Day.

His community play Don Juan in Kingston launched the Rose Theatre in Kingston with a cast of nearly 200, and he has directed on-board entertainment for Swan Hellenic's Minerva Cruise Ships and staged The London International Film Awards.

== Teaching and new writing development ==
He has led new writing development projects at Soho Theatre and The National Theatre Studio, lectured at Goldsmiths College, RADA and the Brit School and directed students in The Seven Ages of Sondheim, Nicholas Nickleby, Petite Rouge, Sherlock Holmes – The Early Years and Jesus Christ Superstar (Arts Ed) Romeo and Juliet (Central School of Speech and Drama) Dear Anyone (Guildford Conservatoire) Napoli Millionaria, Three Men on a Horse and Backstage (Rose Bruford) The Taming of the Shrew, Howard Barker's The Possibilities and First Love (The Court Training Company)

== Playwriting, composition and journalism ==
His work as a playwright and composer is widely published and performed internationally and as a journalist he regularly broadcasts, blogs and writes about theatre.

== Works ==
- Lost Boy (musical) Charing Cross Theatre
