= Son (Korean surname) =

- Hangul: 손
- Hanja: 孫
- RR: Son
- MR: Son

Son, Sohn or Shon (孫, 손) is a common Korean family name. It is a transliteration of the Chinese surname Sun.

There are two clans of Son, one in Gwangju and the other in the Gyeongsang region. The clan originated from the Miryang Park clan.

As of 2000, there were 415,182 people by this surname in South Korea.

== List of notable people with this name ==
=== Son ===
- Son Ah-seop (born 1988), South Korean professional baseball player
- Son Byong-hi (1861–1922), Korean religious leader and independence activist
- Son Byong-ho (born 1962), South Korean actor
- Son Dam-bi (born 1983), South Korean singer and actress
- Son Dong-woon (born 1991), South Korean singer, member of boy band Highlight
- Son Chae-young (born 1999), South Korean rapper and singer, member of girl group Twice
- Son Chang-min (born 1965), South Korean actor
- Son Chol-u (born 1973), North Korean cross-country skier
- Son Eun-seo (born 1986), South Korean actress
- Son Eun-ju (born 1990), South Korean cyclist
- Son Ga-in (born 1987), South Korean singer and actress, member of girl group Brown Eyed Girls
- Son Gab-do (born 1960), South Korean former wrestler
- Son Hak-gyu (born 1947), South Korean politician, former governor of Gyeonggi-do
- Son Heung-min (born 1992), South Korean professional footballer
- Son Ho-jun (born 1984), South Korean actor and singer
- Son Ho-young (born 1980), Korean-American singer, member of boy band g.o.d
- Son Hwa-yeon (born 1997), South Korean footballer
- Son Hyun-joo (born 1965), South Korean actor
- Son Hyun-woo (stage name Shownu, born 1992), South Korean singer, member of boy band Monsta X
- Igor Son (born 1998), Kazakhstani-Korean weightlifter
- Masayoshi Son (born 1957), Japanese-Korean businessman, founder of Softbank and chairman of Sprint Corporation
- Lavrenti Son (born 1941), Soviet-Kazakhstani-Korean playwright
- Son Je-yong (born 1994), South Korean professional racing cyclist
- Son Jeong-hyeon (born 1991), South Korean footballer
- Son Jeong-im (born 1968), South Korean former field hockey player
- Son Jeong-tak (born 1976), South Korean footballer
- Son Ji-chang (born 1970), South Korean actor and singer
- Son Ji-yoon (born 1983), South Korean actress
- Son Jin-young (born 1985), South Korean singer and actor
- Son Jong-won (born 1984), South Korean chef
- Son Jun-ho (actor) (born 1983), South Korean singer and actor
- Son Jun-ho (footballer) (born 1992), South Korean professional footballer
- Son Mi-na (born 1964), South Korean team handball player, Olympic gold medalist
- Son Min-chol (born 1986), Japanese-North Korean former professional footballer
- Son Na-eun (born 1994), South Korean singer and actress, former member of girl group Apink
- Son Sang-yeon (born 2002), South Korean actor
- Son Se-bin (born 1989), South Korean actress
- Son Se-il (1935–2024), South Korean journalist, and politician
- Son Seong-yoon (born 1984), South Korean actress
- Son Seung-joon (born 1982), South Korean footballer
- Son Seung-lak (born 1982), South Korean retired baseball player
- Son Seung-won (born 1990), South Korean actor
- Son Seung-yeon (born 1993), South Korean singer, winner of The Voice of Korea season 1
- Son Si-hyun (born 1980), South Korean baseball player
- Son Sook (born 1944), South Korean actress and former politician
- Sue Son (born 1985), South Korean classical and crossover violinist
- Son Suh-hyun (born 1999), South Korean figure skater
- Son Suk-ku (born 1983), South Korean actor, director, and screenwriter
- Son Tae-jin (born 1988), South Korean Taekwondo athlete
- Son Tae-young (born 1980), South Korean actress, model, beauty pageant titleholder
- Son Taek-su (born 1970), South Korean poet and editor
- Taizo Son (born 1972), Japanese businessman, chairman of GungHo
- Son Wan-ho (born 1988), South Korean badminton player
- Son Won-gil (born 1999), South Korean former footballer
- Son Won-il (born 1962), South Korean voice actor
- Son Woo-hyeon (born 1989), South Korean actor, singer, songwriter
- Son Woo-hyuk (born 1983), South Korean actor
- Son Woong-jung (born 1962), South Korean former footballer
- Son Yak-sun (born 1966), South Korean former cyclist
- Son Ye-jin (born 1982), South Korean actress
- Son Yeol Eum (born 1986), South Korean world renowned classical pianist
- Son Yeon-jae (born 1994), South Korean retired rhythmic gymnast
- Son Yong-chan (born 1991), South Korean footballer
- Son Young-hee (born 1993), South Korean weightlifter
- Son Young-ki (born 1985), South Korean foil fencer
- Son Young-wan (born 1934), South Korean former volleyball player

=== Shon ===
- Shon Jin-hwan (born 1968), South Korean retired badminton player
- Shon Ju-il (born 1969), South Korean former sprinter
- Shon Seung-mo (born 1980), South Korean badminton player, Olympic silver medalist
- Shon Seung-wan (stage name Wendy, born 1994), South Korean singer, member of girl group Red Velvet

=== Sohn ===
- Sohn Ah-ram (born 1980), South Korean novelist
- Amara Sohn-Walker (born 1981), American journalist and news anchor
- Sohn Ji-in (born 2006), South Korean rhythmic gymnast
- Sohn Kee-chung (1912–2002), South Korean athlete and first ethnic Korean to win a medal at the Olympic Games
- Sohn Kyung-han (born 1951), South Korean defence attorney and law professor
- Peter Sohn (born 1977), American animator, director, voice actor, and storyboard artist
- Sonja Sohn (born 1964), American actress, activist, filmmaker
- Stephen Sohn (born 1986), Korean American model
- Sohn Suk-hee (born 1956), South Korean journalist, former president of JTBC
- Sung Won Sohn (born 1944), Korean American economist
- Sohn Won-pyung (born 1979), South Korean novelist and film maker
- Sohn Won-yil (1909–1980), admiral, founded the South Korean navy

== See also ==
- Korean name
- List of Korean family names
- Seon (Korean name)
