= Attitude (magazine) =

British gay magazine

- Jonathan Bailey on the cover of the magazine's inaugural Attitude 101 List of LGBTQ trailblazers, February 2021
- Editor: Cliff Joannou
- Senior Content Editor: Dale Fox
- Categories: Gay, Men's lifestyle
- Frequency: Bi-monthly
- Circulation: 11,000 (digital only) plus print circulation unspecified
- First issue: May 1994
- Company: Stream Publishing Limited
- Country: United Kingdom
- Based in: London
- Language: English
- Website: attitude.co.uk
- ISSN: 1353-1875

Attitude is a British gay lifestyle magazine owned by Stream Publishing Limited. It is sold worldwide as a physical magazine and as a digital download. The first issue of Attitude appeared in May 1994. A separate Thai edition was published from March 2011 to April 2018, a Vietnamese edition launched in November 2013, and editions in Belgium and the Netherlands launched in February 2017.

== Publication ==
=== Circulation ===
According to marketing news website The Drum, "Attitude's circulation is not audited by ABC and it does not declare its figures, but it promotes itself as the UK's best-selling gay magazine." Attitude and Gay Times are considered the top gay men's magazines. Attitude describes its typical reader as "a gay male professional, typically in his 20s or 30s".

=== Content ===
In 1997, art historian Reina Lewis wrote that Attitude was "notable for its glossy and gorgeous fashion editorial and [...] generally more visual-led [than other gay and lesbian magazines]". Lewis also wrote that Attitude used both male and female photographers, and that photographers' sexuality was not made clear: "we do not know if the photographer is gay, although they are certainly gay-literate". In 1999, academic Paul Skidmore wrote that Attitude "has explicitly pitched itself at the cross-over point between gay and straight men’s fashion using at times androgynous and ambiguous images in its fashion shots" In 2003, it was characterized as "a gay (and less laddish) version of GQ".

Describing the contents of Attitude, Boy George said: "It's not just full of cock and arse. There is some intellect in there. Most gay magazines are all nipple rings and eight-inch penises and pecs. [Attitude has] a bit of that, it has to be said, but there is stuff to read."

Attitude has published issues with themes, including a Naked Issue. The 2014 Naked Issue featured Dan Osborne on the cover. In July 2005, the magazine launched fashion supplements as a spin-off publication. The March" 2010 issue was themed as the titles first Older Issue with EastEnders star John Partridge on the cover. The February 2017 edition was the first Body Issue.

=== Covers ===
Attitude features a mixture of gay and straight cover stars. As of February 2017, Attitude had published 280 issues with more than 300 covers. More than half of the cover stars have been gay. The longest stretch straight celebrities have not appeared on the cover is three months. Then-Editor Matthew Todd previously suggested there were not enough famous gay people to have them on the cover constantly and has made a point of putting celebrities on the cover such as Beth Ditto (first lesbian woman on an Attitude cover) and Kele Okereke (first black gay man on an Attitude cover).

In 2016, Prince William became the first member of the British royal family to appear on the cover of a gay magazine when he appeared on the cover of the July issue of Attitude; in the cover story, he also became the first British royal to openly condemn the bullying of the gay community.

In the January 2020 issue, Yasmin Benoit and Anick Soni became the first asexual and intersex people on cover of Attitude respectively.

== History ==
Attitude began publication in 1994 as part of the Northern & Shell group owned by Richard Desmond. Attitude was founded by a straight couple, Tim Nicholson and Jane Phillips, with gay writers Paul Burston and Pas Paschali.

In 2004, Attitude bought by Simon Robinson, who then formed Remnant Media. In 2008, Attitude and other Remnant titles were bought by Trojan. Attitude was acquired in September 2016 by Stream Publishing.

=== Notable interviews ===
Tony Blair gave the first interview a serving Prime Minister has ever given a gay publication in May 2005. He gave his second ever gay press interview to mark Attitude's 15th birthday in May 2009. In the 2009 interview, Blair questioned the Pope's attitude towards homosexuality, arguing that religious leaders must start "rethinking" the issue.

For the August 2009 issue, Harry Potter star Daniel Radcliffe gave his first interview to a gay publication in which he announced his support for British political party the Liberal Democrats. He said: "I just loathe homophobia. It's just disgusting and animal and stupid and it's just thick people who can't get their heads around it and are just scared. I grew up around gay people entirely. I was the only child in my class who had any experience of homosexuality or anything like that".

In February 2010, former Conservative party leader David Cameron appeared on the cover of Attitude giving his first interview to a gay publication.

In a 2016, Prince William was photographed exclusively for the cover of Attitude, marking the very first time a member of the British Royal Family had posed for on appeared on or in a gay magazine. Inside, the Prince met nine LGBTQ people who had experienced homo, bi or transphobic abuse growing up and had suffered mental health problems as a result. The issue made headlines all over the world on news and television media including BBC, NBC, ITN, Sky News and many more.

== Achievements ==
In 2005, former editor Adam Mattera won Best Men's Magazine editor of the year at the BSME awards. It was the first time that a gay magazine editor won the prize. Mattera was short-listed again for the prize in 2006. In April 2008, Attitude's fashion director was named in The Times as one of the UK's top 20 star-makers for his contribution to the music industry, alongside Simon Cowell. Attitude was later edited by Matthew Todd, a long-time associate editor and former deputy editor and writer of the play Blowing Whistles. Todd was nominated as Best Men's Magazine Editor of the Year at the BSME awards 2009 and 2010, the only gay magazine to have been nominated. He went on to win the award in 2011 and 2015 and won BSME Scoop of the Year in 2016 for his Prince William edition. Todd left in 2016 on publication of his book Straight Jacket: How to be Gay and Happy, about LGBT mental health, something he began writing about in Attitude in 2010.

The digital edition of Attitude had a circulation of 9,966 for the period of July–December 2013 according to ABC. None of the gay titles reveal print ABC figures (although Bent used to, placing its readership at 42,347 when it was last audited by ABC in 2004) but Press Gazette has named Attitude as the biggest-selling in the sector.

== International editions ==
=== Thai edition ===
GMM Publishing began publishing the Thai edition of Attitude in March 2011. It featured Thailand's top celebrities including Ananda Everingham, Mario Maurer, Nadech Kugimiya, Utt Panichkul and Jiho Lee. Until early 2013, the edition had the local column Straight Guy We Love by Thai photographer Haruehun Airry. The magazine ceased publication with the April 2018 edition.

=== Attitude Vietnam: Thái độ sống ===
Based in Ho Chi Minh City, and published monthly by Thanh Nien Publishing House in association with Skyharp Media & Entertainment Co. Ltd, Vietnamese edition of Attitude was released in Vietnam on 25 November 2013. This edition focuses on supporting on gay rights movement and raising awareness among people.
