= Lee Ji-ho =

Lee Ji-ho could refer to:

- Jieho Lee (born 1973), American filmmaker
- Jiho Lee (born 1985), South Korean model
- Lee Ji-ho (footballer) (born 2002), South Korean footballer
