= Islamic fashion =

Fashion in Muslim communities

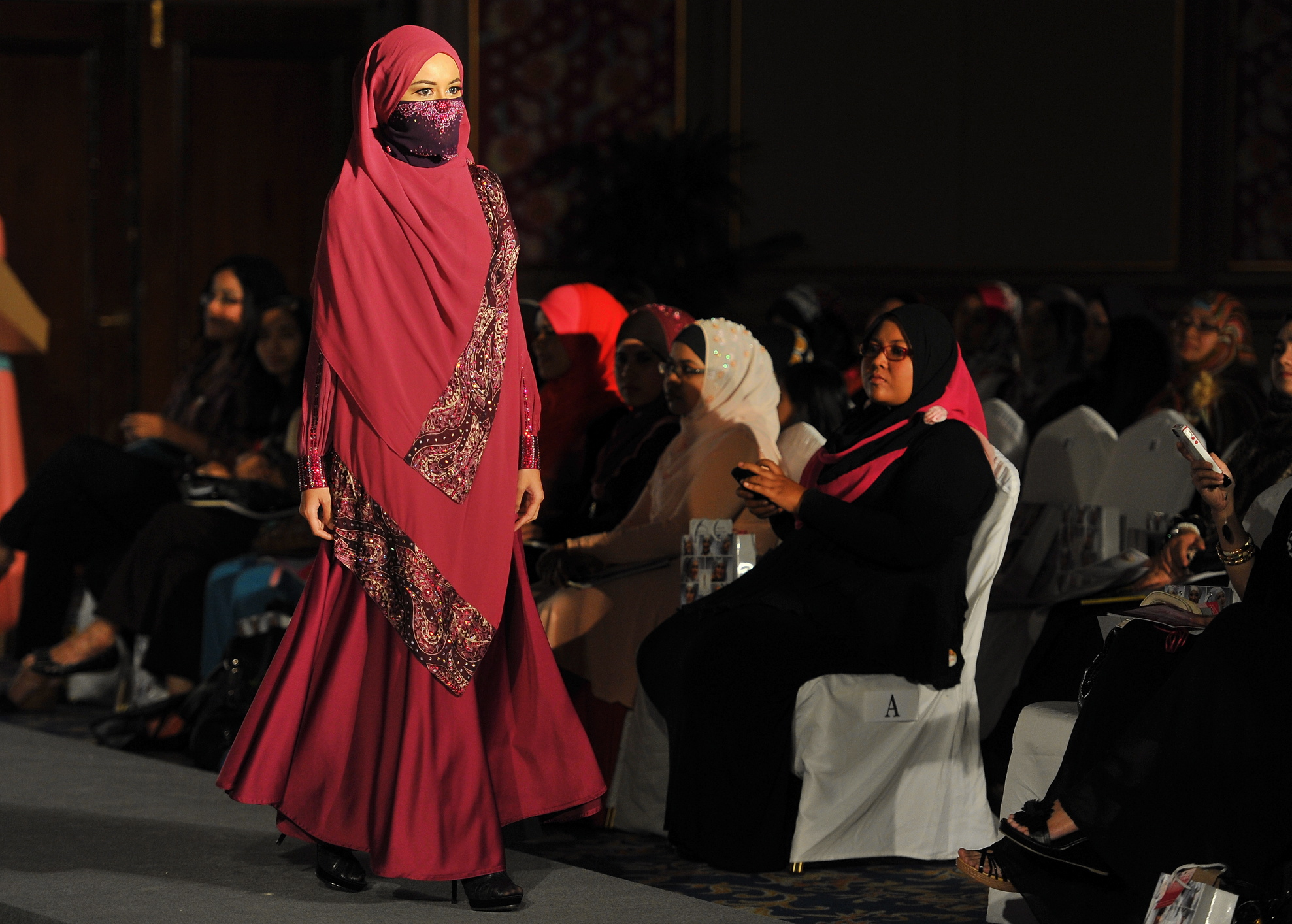
Moslema in style fashion show at PWTC.

Islamic Fashion combines Islamic practices and the desire to create clothing that can fit in with trends in the broader fashion industry.

The global growth of “an Islamic consumer sector, which explicitly forges links between religiosity and fashion, encouraging Muslims to be both covered and fashionable, modest and beautiful,” is relatively new, emerging in the 1980s.

The most recent developments in the field have caused varied public discourse on a series of different levels, from the political to the religious to the cultural. Different positions are taken by different participants in the discussion of the politics and cultures of Islamic fashion.

The Islamic fashion market is a rapidly expanding, though still relatively underdeveloped, global segment. Major brands have increasingly introduced collections associated with Muslim religious observances but have not yet consolidated this market among Muslim consumers in Western countries. This has created opportunities for emerging designers, particularly from Muslim-majority countries. The United Arab Emirates, especially Dubai, has sought to position itself as a center of Islamic fashion through its Design District and concentration of established Islamic fashion brands.

== History of Islamic fashion ==
To understand the Islamic fashion controversy and how it has evolved, it's vital to understand the historical and religious meaning behind the clothing. It's important to remember that the specific styles of clothing vary among time periods and across geographical regions. Arabic dress dates back to the 13th century—men and women from this time period both wore a simple tunic dress with a loose garment over their head. The difference between the genders was that women had to cover more of their body and usually had more accessories and embellishments. Another region that largely influenced modern Islamic dress is Turkey. It was different from Arabic dress in that " traditional Turkish ensemble for either men or women consisted of loose fitting trousers (şalvar, don) and a shirt (gömlek), topped by a variety of jackets (cebken), vests (yelek), and long coats (entâri, kaftan, üç etek)." Something these two regions had in common with their dress is that what people wore was an indication of their social status. In Arabic regions such as Iraq and Palestine, the way men covered their heads, turban or shawl, was related to their status. In Turkey, they also used headgear to show status in addition to layering clothes and using certain "richer" materials. Since Arabic clothing came long before Turkish and other regions' clothing, it's clear it had a large influence on Islamic fashion for all the subsequent cultures. A big part of the current Islamic fashion market is women's headdresses. Although men and women were both supposed to dress modestly, "The veil is a vehicle for distinguishing between women and men and a means of controlling male sexual desire". There are four main styles of wearing a veil or headscarf in Islamic tradition. The first is named the Hijab. The hijab is made with one or two scarves, covering both the head and the neck. The face may remain unveiled. This style is most widely seen in the West, as well as still being popular within Middle Eastern countries. The next veil is called the Niqab, which covers the entirety of the body as well as the face while leaving an opening for the eyes. There are two main styles of Niqab. A half-niqab is identified by a scarf that veils the face while leaving the eyes and part of the forehead uncovered. A Gulf niqab only leaves narrow slits for the eyes. A third veil is the Chador, which is a full-body-length shawl, pinned closed at the neck. The head and body are covered in this style, while leaving the face visible. This style is commonly seen in Iran. A fourth veiling style is called the Burqa. The burqa is a full-body covering where the entire face and body are veiled, and there is a mesh screen in front of the eyes.

== Economics of Islamic fashion ==
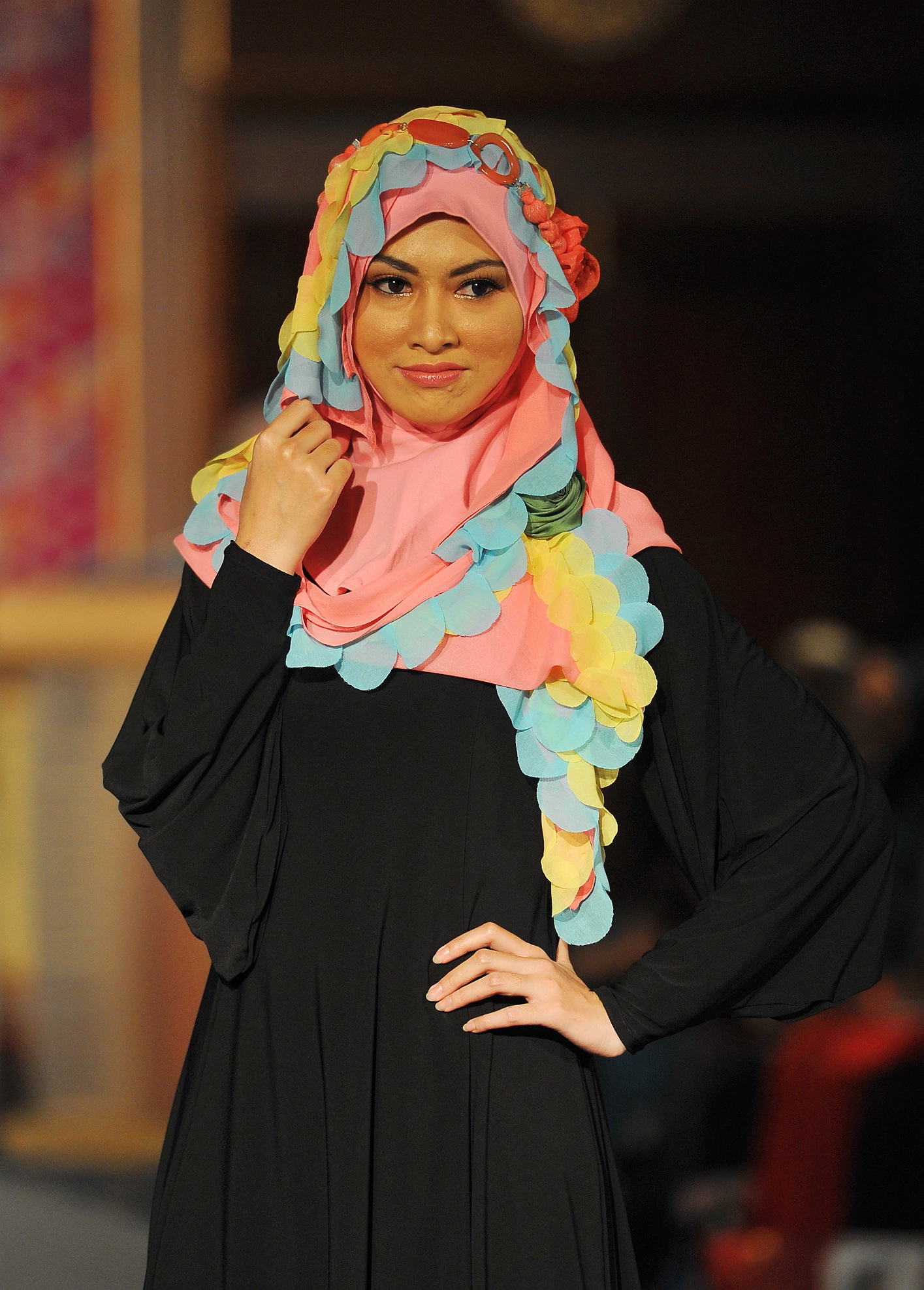
Moslema in style fashion show in Kuala Lumpur

Today, the Islamic Fashion market is still in its early development stage; however, according to the numbers provided by the Global Islamic Economy Indicator the dynamics will rapidly change: Muslim consumers spent an estimated $266bn on clothing in 2014, a number that is projected to grow up to $484bn by 2019. Although the figures show the purchase of clothing that cannot be translated directly into Islamic fashion, the trend clearly proves that the modest fashion industry will be flourishing.

Furthermore, the Pew Research predicts that the global population of Muslims will equal the number of Christians by 2050; hence, the purchasing power of young Muslim customers will steadily grow that presents new opportunities for both young designers and big fashion brands. As for the seasonal profit the famous companies like DKNY, Hilfiger are starting to pay more attention to observances like Ramadan when the number of Muslim consumers rockets. However, currently, the world-famous designers present their collections, whether in Gulf States or online only, while omitting the opportunities and growing demand presented in Western countries, as it expressed Amani Al-Khatahtbeh, the editor-in-chief of MuslimGirl.net:

“What's the point of having these Ramadan collections from these huge brands and huge designers if they're only being made available to people overseas who are already well aware of Ramadan and inclusive of it? Really, it's here in the U.S. or other Western countries where that kind of visibility would go a long way.” - Amani Al-Khatahtbeh, interview to Fortune, 15 July 2015

Considering the slow realization of emerging capacities by the global brands, the niche of Islamic fashion market would be likely occupied by Middle Eastern enterprises and start-ups. As Abdul Rahman Saif Al Ghurair, a member of the Dubai Islamic Economy Development Centre board, said in the interview to Bloomberg:

“The lack of a global Islamic clothing brands presents a unique opportunity for U.A.E. fashion designers.”

Dubai has sought to establish itself as a hub for the Islamic fashion sector and the broader Islamic economy through the development of its Design District, competing alongside established apparel markets such as Turkey. While international luxury and retail brands have increasingly introduced modest and Ramadan collections, emerging local designers continue to face barriers to entering the global market. To expand access to design training in the Middle East, tuition-free institutions such as Creative Space Beirut have been established to provide fashion education for aspiring designers..

== Politics and culture ==
Fashion, as all creative and artistic fields, does not exist in a vacuum; it has to relate with the socio-political culture in which it exists, and therefore the way such culture responds to it. Islamic Fashion has witnessed a series of commentaries since mid-2014, when DKNY launched its first ever Ramadan fashion line, as many others did such as Tommy Hilfiger, Oscar de la Renta, Mango, UNIQLO, Zara, H&M and Dolce & Gabbana.

=== Internal criticism ===
Considering the controversial nature of the topic, a plethora of reactions was expected, and it was varied in nature and sources. Internal reception was varied, encompassing reactions such as the one by fashion graduate Tabinda-Kauser Ishaq, who designed a ‘poppy hijab’ for Remembrance Day, who welcomed the arrival of mainstream Islam fashion and deemed it “a good move for the business of fashion”, and the one by Mariah Idrissi, the first hijab-wearing model in an H&M ad who said that, "Seeing Dolce & Gabbana launch in this market is definitely a positive thing".

A reminder of the religious connotation of the hijab came from Shelina Janmohamed, author of Love In A Headscarf, who pointed out how,

“Today's fashion industry is about consumerism and objectification - buy, buy, buy and be judged by what you wear. Muslim fashion is teetering between asserting a Muslim woman's right to be beautiful and well-turned out, and buying more stuff than you need, and being judged by your clothes - both of which are the opposite of Islamic values.”

On the subject of the high-end commercialization of Islamic fashion, Ruqaiya Haris explained how Dolce & Gabbana's hijab range was aimed at people like her and yet made her feel excluded:

“It is difficult for me to feel excited and grateful for a fashion line that supposedly caters to me and the requirements of my faith when it feels as though the overwhelming message is that the only desirable Muslim is a wealthy one; that Muslim fashion is acceptable, but only when legitimised by a major western fashion label. And that ultimately western society will always have the monopoly on what is fashionable and relevant.”

Similarly, Somali-American model and humanitarian Halima Aden, who is credited with being one of the first Hijabi women to appear on the cover of Vogue, spoke out in 2020 about the darker side of being a trailblazer for Muslim women within the fashion industry. After setting out to give back to the Muslim community through humanitarian aid work and increasing visibility for Hijabi women in fashion, Aden famously took a step back from her career when she revealed that she was becoming less and less in control of her ability to stay true to her Muslim values due to violations of contract clauses, and feelings of being tokenized by the organizations that she worked with. Aiden stated in one 2021 interview with BBC “I just decided I'm done with the NGO world using me for 'my beautiful story of courage and hope'

On this ethical side of the discourse the argument made by Sabah Haneen Choudhry, a third-year Social Anthropology student at SOAS, was that in 2016, the rise in Islamic fashion must be seen as a political matter:

“My issue is this: why is the hijab ‘acceptable’ only when it's appropriated and managed by major corporations— Western regimes that, in other words, have the power to permit and regulate what is deemed tolerable, capitalizable and not? Why can't Muslim women decide the parameters of their Islamic identity and sexual morality, without facing harsh scrutiny from within and outside the ‘imagined’ Muslim community?”

The premise of the cultural appropriation side of the discourse, addressed online by different sources, can be summed up by Haris’ words when she states how Dolce & Gabbana’s range “looks like an appropriation of existing traditions without giving them any real recognition.” As the IFDC Islamic Fashion and Design Council noticed, we are witnessing the emergence of a segment they called “Muslim Futurists”: people who choose to live a life they feel is both faithful and modern, and who believe that both of these aspects are their right. It's the first recognition of a Muslim consumer who wants the best brands, products and services – they want to be fashion-forward, for example, but only when it meets the requirements of their faith.

=== External criticism ===
Public comment came also from outside the Islamic community, a rather controversial statement by former fashion mogul Pierre Bergé, life and business partner of designer Yves Saint Laurent, who accused designers catering to the Islamic audience of taking part in the “enslavement of women”. Bergé’s statement stirred different reactions, particularly regarding this part of his statement:

“"In life you have to choose the side of freedom," said Bergé. "Rather than covering women up, "we must teach [Muslim] women to revolt, to take their clothes off, to learn to live like most of the women in the rest of the world."”

Which, as Julianne Shepherd writes in her article for Jezebel, expresses a rather sexist commentary behind the travesty of feminist defence. Another strong criticism came from French's minister for women’s rights Laurence Rossignol, who, speaking to BFTV over the decision by fashion companies including Marks & Spencer, H&M and Dolce & Gabbana to produce and promote fashion aimed at Muslims, criticised the fashion labels, saying the clothing was not “socially responsible” and “from a certain point of view ... promotes the shutting away of women's bodies”. When the interviewer suggested certain women made the decision of their own free will to cover themselves, Rossignol replied: “Of course, they are women who make the choice ... there were also ... American negroes who were in favour of slavery.”

A petition was launched by a French student, Hawa N’Dongo, on change.org, calling for Rossignol to be punished:

“It is with anger and exasperation that we have been once again confronted with the verbal violence of a political leader,” wrote N’Dongo. “Asked about the false debate on ‘Islamic fashion’ she came out with scandalous propositions that feed the confusion and stigmatisation of Muslim women and the millions of transported slaves.”

A controversial subject and one that many Muslim women feel strongly about, since it covers a wide variety of issues and problems that have a history of not being addressed and that are only now seeing recognition on a larger, more global scale.

== Islamic fashion on the web ==
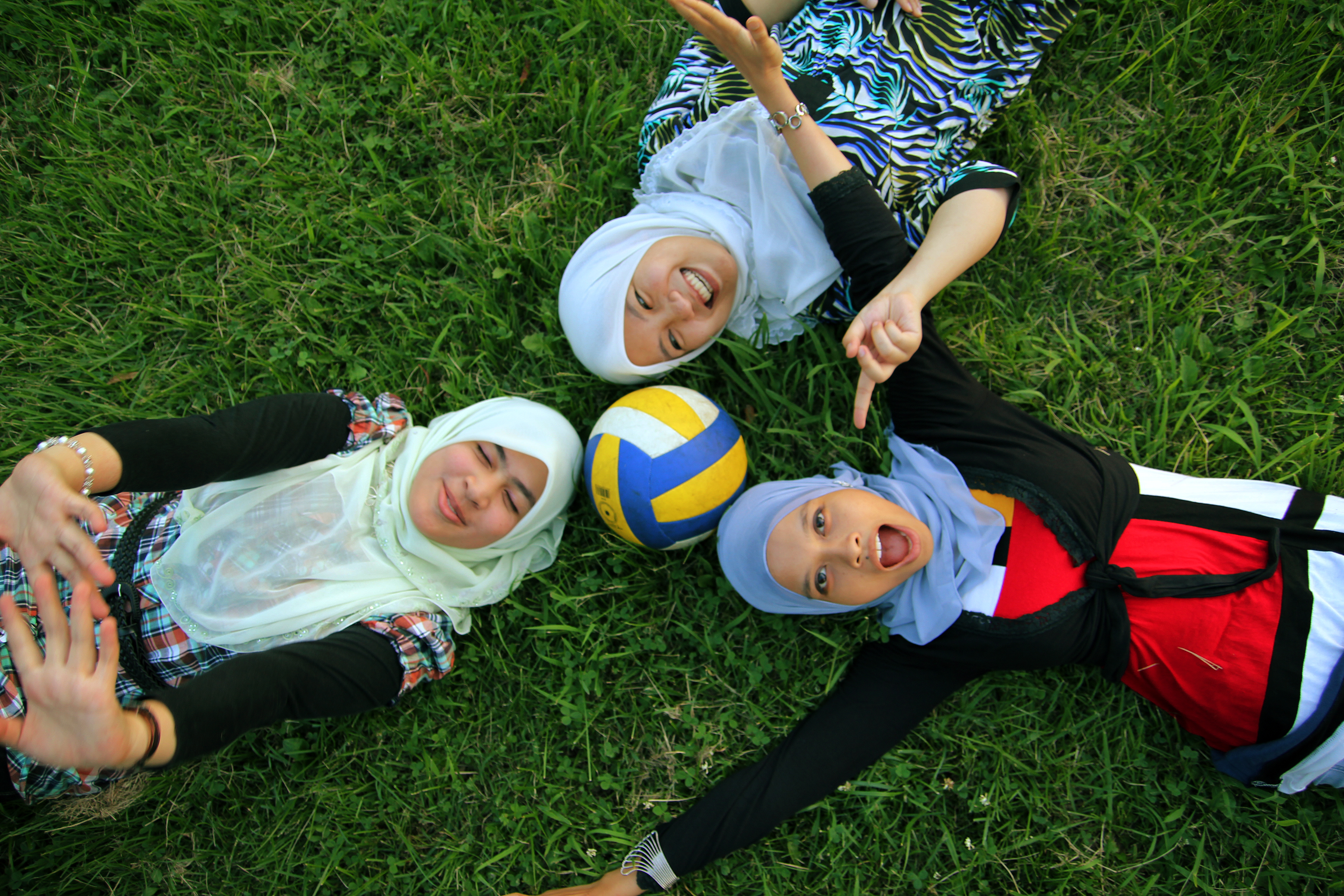
Young generation - main target of Islamic Fashion market.

The growing popularity of online shopping worldwide among young Muslims has proved that the Internet nowadays is playing crucial role in promoting exclusivist Muslim identities as well as is enabling unexpected convergences and connections between individuals of different backgrounds and between the demands of fashion and faith. Moreover, the Islamic Fashion online stores are promoting ethical commerce as part of their revenue goes to charity. The past decade has seen the diversification and spread of Islamic fashion commerce in Britain, the United States and around the world, both on and off the Web, with some entrepreneurs catering to the higher end of the market.

Partially, the opposition to hijab ban in some countries and limiting regulations for doing sports pushed for transformation of Islamic clothing and spurred the activity on the Internet (fashion blogs, social networks, etc.), notably, contributed to the growth of the wide range of Islamic Fashion e-shops. However, the emergence of online stores alongside the Muslim lifestyle magazines and fashion blogs has risen the wave of criticism related to both the commercialization of religion and veiled religious propaganda. On the other hand, some scholars interpret the matter the other way:

“[...] the entrepreneurs involved in promoting hijab online may be motivated by a mixture of religious, ethical, political and commercial concerns which grow out of their personal experiences of living in a multicultural urban environment and which reflect and respond to the desire expressed by many young Muslim women living in the West to be both fashionable and modest.” - Emma Tarlo, HIJAB ONLINE, 2010

Especially for the Muslim women, hijab has become an important part for their appearance: they are increasingly looking for fashion that doesn't set them apart from the rest of society. With the rapid growth of digital networks and social media users, the need of these “digital platforms” is increasing and the purchasing power of young consumers tends to grow over the years. Apart from the traditional websites as online stores, it's possible to use social media to market the hijab by saving time and costs, starting from Facebook, to Instagram and Pinterest.

=== Islamic fashion online stores ===
Islamic Fashion and Design Council (IFDC) is a platform that provides support, initiatives and programmes to help make the industry more cohesive for Islamic fashion by bringing the industry players together to help them to generate more opportunities.

“This clothing is beautiful, and the beauty is made for every woman.”- Indonesian Fashion Designer Amy Atmanto

Clothing companies and brands are quite fragmented globally. In most OIC (Organization of Islamic Cooperation) countries, local clothing companies that are local culture - driven dominate the market: a special segment of Islamic/modest clothing companies is emerging globally, some of the most established producers and labels understandably come from Muslim-majority countries. However, new labels from other countries - especially those targeting the younger generation of Muslim women - are quickly gaining tractions in their local markets and beyond. The Jordan-based label Shukr, for instance, reported sales in more than 70 countries, mostly in the United States and the United Kingdom.

== Social media ==
It is a continuing growing trend: some women designed their own clothes that suited their needs because the mainstream market could not provide it, these personalities on Instagram and several blogging sites started getting attention. They became the icons people looked up to for fashion inspiration:

“Young hijabi Instagrammers like Maryam Asadullah, Sobia Masood and many other social media personalities have made a huge impact in the modest fashion industry. These personalities created a trend whereby they shared their stylish, modest outfits, tips and tutorials while other people admired their style, thus gaining them big followership. They were able to provide what the mainstream fashion industry was not giving them and the modest wearer. This inspired and helped many other young people who were following them. More and more people started sharing their modest styles on social media and it became a buzz that changed the view of modest fashion”.

Asadullah is just one of many fashion-forward hijab-clad Muslim women showcasing their personal style on the popular photo-sharing social media site. These Instagrammers fill a gap that mainstream media has still to cover: inspiration and advice for women who want to maintain religious standards of modesty without sacrificing personal style. Fashion Vlogger, designer and co-owner of Vela Scarves Marwa Atik is another example of Muslim women taking charge of their religious and fashion identity. Since the fashion industry hasn't been marketed much towards Muslim women, Atik took it upon herself to edit existing scarfs and create designs for her friends from her garage, until the weight and volume of her work became too much, and her sister decided to step in.

Vela Scarves is a scarf fashion line based out of California, U.S.A., started up by Atik in 2009 and officially launched in 2010 with partner and sister Tasneem Atik Sabri. This brand focuses on hijab styles for Muslim women, with "empowerment, modern flair, and individual style" in mind. Social media has made it possible for users around the globe to contribute to the fashion industry, and is now serving as a platform to introduce Islamic fashion to the world. Vela has a 104,000 following on Instagram, and a 7,500 following on YouTube, allowing the company a large platform for advertising and selling their scarves local and worldwide.

Fashion hijab appendages such as Islamic fashion is also greatly increased their sales through social networking. Social media is acting as a catalyst in making the fashion industry more accepting to couture that isn't Western-centric. In September 2015, Swedish brand H&M was the first of international fashion retailers to feature a Muslim model wearing a hijab in a video designed to encourage consumers to recycle their clothes.

There are many Muslim fashion influencers on Instagram and TikTok, either showcasing their own modest fashion or giving tips to others who dress modestly. The Urban Hijabi, run by Nabeeha Fakih Sheikh has over 70,000 followers. Sheikh told a reporter that the goal of her account was to showcase her hijab, which she emphasizes is her choice, and emphasize to followers that one can be fashionable and wear a hijab. The year 2016 saw modesty going mainstream in Western culture. The first hijabi posed on the cover of Playboy Magazine, Anniesa well-known New York Fashion Week show had all of the models wearing modest clothing and Hijabs.[40]

== Islamic Fashion by Country ==
=== Indonesia ===
Muslim fashion in Indonesia is experiencing rapid progress. Various local Indonesian products are now known to the world, with Muslim fashion estimated to be worth around 13.5 billion USD.

The State Global Islamic Economy Report for 2018/19 revealed that Indonesia was runner-up as the country that develops the best Muslim fashion in the world. Some Muslim fashion products in Indonesia that are well known abroad include Rabbani, Elzatta, Zoya, Zaskia Mecca (ZM), Dian Pelangi, and Buttonscarves.

In February 2025, Indonesia announced plans to target five Middle Eastern countries—Iran, Turkiye, Saudi Arabia, Pakistan, and Egypt—as potential markets for its Muslim fashion exports.

== See also ==
- Islam
- Women in Islam
- Fashion
- Islam and clothing
- Hijab
- Consumer culture
- Politics
- Market
- Muslim world
- Capitalism
- E-commerce
- Social networks
- Media
- Fashion week
