= Modest fashion =

Fashion trend in women of wearing less skin-revealing clothes

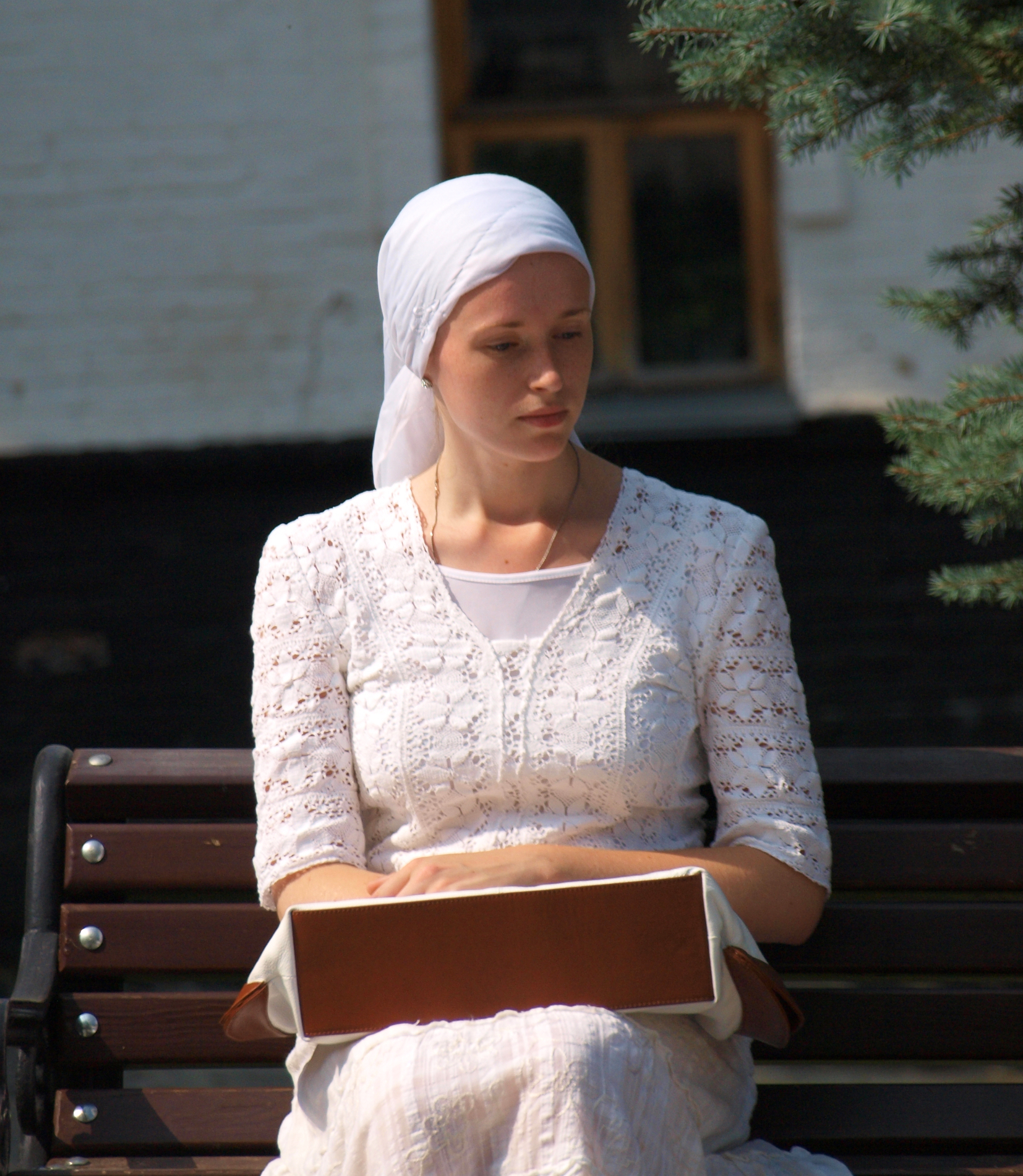
An Eastern Orthodox woman in Ukraine is seen wearing a dress and a Christian headcovering.

The term modest fashion or modest dressing refers to a fashion trend in women of wearing less skin-revealing clothes, especially in a way that satisfies their spiritual and stylistic requirements for reasons of faith, religion or personal preference. The exact interpretation of 'modest' varies across cultures and countries. There is no unambiguous interpretation as it is influenced by socio-cultural characteristics of each country.

== History ==
The term "modest" may have varied interpretations across religious boundaries and even within them. Commonalities can also exist; for example, many Christian, Jewish, and Muslim women practice the veiling of their head, with Christian women wearing a headcovering, Jewish women wearing a tichel, and Muslim women wearing a hijab.

On 28 July 2015, a world panel discussion was held in Turin with the aim of defining guidelines for modest fashion.

This growing phenomenon has been studied by scholars such as British professor Reina Lewis from London College of Fashion. Among her works on the topic we can mention 'Modest Fashion: Styling Bodies, Mediating Faith' (2013) and 'Muslim Fashion: Contemporary Style Cultures' (2015).

In late 2018, modest fashion was considered a 250 billion dollar industry. Brands designed for adherents of specific faiths may be purchased by other persons seeking modest clothing; the Jordan-based Muslim-oriented label Shukr, for example, also has a conservative Christian and Jewish consumer base.

== Reception ==
Muslim and Jewish women have spoken of modest fashion as empowering. “There’s a general misconception that modest clothing is inherently oppressive,” said Michelle Honig, an Orthodox Jewish fashion journalist and the keynote speaker during fashion month at New York University for the Meeting Through Modesty fashion symposium. “But if women in so-called ‘liberated countries’ still choose to cover their bodies, then they have made a choice. They have agency."

However, some feminists have criticized modest fashion, considering it a "cynical" concept. In 2019, after a modest fashion exhibition hosted in Frankfurt, Germany, Inge Bell from group Terre des Femmes stated that it was "a slap in the face of girls and women worldwide who don't want to wear the headscarf or want to take it off". A letter sent by activist to the EMMA magazine called the exhibition an attack on both domestic and foreign women's rights activists, also emphasizing that "every year, thousands of women in Iran are punished for violating this dress code."

Modest fashion across religions expresses consensus that it should not be experienced as a limiting factor in style. Brands are churning out designs and collections that an orthodox Muslim, Jew, Christian or Hindu can wear in style. Dolce & Gabbana, H&M, and Uniqlo are just a few names that have entered the modest fashion segment, making clothes that cover most parts of the body while allowing women to experiment with the latest trends.

== See also ==
- Plain dress
- Outward holiness
- Jewish religious clothing
- Islamic clothing
- Purdah
- Tzniut
