= Stephen Sohn =

American model (born 1986)

- Born: Stephen Seung-hyun Sohn; June 5, 1986 (age 39); San Francisco, California
- Occupation(s): Model and Strategic Pricing Business Analyst
- Years active: 2009–present
- Height: 5 ft 11 in (1.80 m)

Korean name
- Hangul: 손승현
- RR: Son Seunghyeon
- MR: Son Sŭnghyŏn

Stephen Sohn (born June 5, 1986) is an American model.

== Personal life ==
Sohn was born in San Francisco, California, with parents of Korean origin. During his childhood, he was raised in South Korea and United States. Sohn attended The Hill School in Pottstown, Pennsylvania, where he was a top scorer student, and then he graduated with a degree in Economics and Mathematics from Duke University in Durham, North Carolina. He allegedly admired a Thai beauty queen Charm Osathanond, Miss Thailand Universe 2006.

== Career ==
Sohn's modeling career takes place in mostly Thailand where he was introduced by Haruehun Airry. Sohn debuted his modeling career with Thai leading magazines namely Lips and Volume in 2009. He participated in fashion catwalks in the downtown Siam Square and in the same year modeled for Zenithorial in the ELLE Fashion Week in Bangkok, Thailand. His work later became reputed on social media, and he was listed on polls across Asia. Sohn was voted as one of the most desirable guys of 2009 by T-Pageant, the largest beauty pageant community in Thailand. He later became a strategic pricing business analyst in Minneapolis, Minnesota, and has not modeled since despite significant support on social media space and published magazine articles namely Men's Health Thailand for instance.

== See also ==
- Haruehun Airry
- Men's Health (magazine)
