= Shukr (brand) =

Clothing company

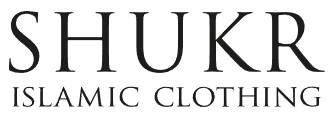
- Industry: Islamic fashion
- Founded: 2001
- Founders: Anas Sillwood; Jaafar Malik
- Headquarters: Amman, Jordan
- Owner: Niswa Fashion
- Website: shukrclothing.com

Shukr (branded as SHUKR) is a Jordan-based brand of Islamic and modest fashion. Established in 2001 by Anas Sillwood and Jaafar Malik, Shukr initially focused on men's wear but later expanded to include clothing for women; as of 2016, women's wear represents the majority of its sales. Designs blend Middle Eastern and Western aesthetics, and are intended primarily for Muslims living in non-Muslim majority countries. Shukr's sales are primarily driven through e-commerce, with its largest markets in the United States, the United Kingdom, and continental Europe. The brand emphasizes its Islamic identity through references to the Qur'an and prominent Muslims, as well as endorsements from prominent Islamic scholars. As of 2026, the brand is owned by Niswa Fashion.

== History ==
Shukr was established by Anas Sillwood and Jaafar Malik in the United Kingdom in 2001. Sillwood, of British and Greek Cypriot heritage, had converted to Islam in his twenties. Travelling to the Middle East, he found "beauty and dignity" in local fashion, and sought to reproduce these styles with better production and finishing standards. The name Shukr comes from the Arabic word shukr, which translates to "gratitude". The brand links its name to Surah Ibrahim, Verse 7, which reads "If you give thanks, I shall certainly increase you"; it identifies the name as emphasizing the importance of showing gratitude to God.

Shukr initially focused on men's wear. Based on Sillwood's negative experiences wearing traditional Middle Eastern garb in the United Kingdom, he intended the line to "be more culturally compatible" with the West. In 2002, it expanded its offerings to include clothing for women. Initial designs were very loose, while later designs were more form fitting. To address complaints about both styles, Shukr adapted a more "middle-ground" approach of loose yet tailored clothing.

In 2002, Shukr also launched a website for e-commerce. At the time, most Muslim fashion in non-Muslim majority countries was limited to small shops in urban settings, often near mosques, or clothing sent by relatives living in Muslim-majority countries. Shukr has thus been identified as the first international e-commerce company dedicated to Muslim clothing, as well as one of the "earliest and most-established British and American Islamic fashion companies". Sales were initially sluggish, but increased rapidly in 2005–2006. Speaking with Bloomberg News in 2015, Sillwood recalled, "it was obvious there was very big potential for the [Islamic fashion] industry."

Shukr was reported in 2016 to be developing a line of modest fashion without explicit Islamic ties. This line would be targeted at non-Muslim consumers, who included conservative Christians and Jews. The company reported sales in seventy countries by 2018, with men's wear representing twenty per cent of sales in most countries; in the United Kingdom, men's wear represented thirty per cent of sales. The largest markets were the United States, the United Kingdom, and continental Europe. By this point, a number of e-commerce sites focused on Islamic fashion had emerged, including the Turkey-based Modinisa and the Malaysia-based Hijub.

Three Shukr-branded stores were in operation by 2015, at which point Shukr was headquartered in Amman, Jordan. To deal with increased competition from global retailers, it had implemented a made-to-order model and tripled the available styles. The brand experienced significant stress during the COVID-19 pandemic, with sales reducing by fifty per cent. This was exacerbated by increased pressure from platforms such as Modanisa, which were backed by larger capital investments. Shukr thus closed two of its stores by 2020. In February 2026, the Shukr brand was acquired by Niswa Fashion.

== Products ==
Shukr sells a range of clothing for Muslim men and women, including abayas, jilbabs, and modified shalwar kameezes, as well as skirts, trousers, dresses, coats, and blouses. In developing its clothes, Shukr consults with ulama (Muslim scholars) to ensure Sharia compliance as well as consumers to better suit their needs. Products are predominantly black, grey, blue, or brown, though they also feature intricate embroidery. Products are produced using organic materials and ethical labour practices. As of 2021, clothing sizes reach 3XL.

In its advertising, Shukr emphasizes its Islamic origins. Its website quotes an abridged hadith, narrated by Abd Allah ibn Mas'ud, that "The Divine is beautiful and loves beauty". It also includes endorsements from prominent Islamic scholars such as Omar Suleiman and Faraz Rabbani, as well as an emphasis on the brand's dedication to itqan (perfection). Several products are named after prominent female figures in Islamic history; for instance, abaya styles are named after Safiyya bint Huyayy, Halima bint Abi Dhu'ayb, and Thuwaybah.

== Analysis ==
In her exploration of e-commerce websites' construction of Muslim women's bodies, Kayla Renée Wheeler notes that Shukr's advertisements tend to avoid presenting the faces of models, instead depicting them below the chin or, for hijabs, from behind. She describes this approach as intended to "avoid claims of idolatry and to prevent the objectification of ... models". In their settings, she writes, models are photographed outdoors against a background of columns, arches, and domes, thereby communicating a "commitment [to] being in the world, not of the world". At the same time, she writes, Shukr has avoided using plus-size models, which she considers to privilege thinness and reproduce the stereotypes that overweight people are lazy, lack self-control, and are morally inferior.

Discussing Islamic fashion in the 21st century, Emma Tarlo identified Shukr as working to challenge negative stereotypes about Muslims. She wrote that, rather than "setting up a polarity between East and West, Muslim and non-Muslim", the brand has blended the styles of northern Africa, southern Asia, and the Middle East with western trends. Sillwood, in an interview with the website DeenPort, argued that the brand seeks to promote "the traditional, moderate Islamic balance; maintaining one's Muslim identity whilst adopting the best practice and culture which the local land has to offer".

== Works cited ==
- Buller, Alicia (11 November 2018). "Men's 'Modest Wear' Set for Global Boom – Experts". Arabian Business – via ProQuest.
- Loho, Petra (15 April 2020). "Will the Modest Survive? COVID-19 puts Fashion Industry to the Test". Salaam Gateway. Archived from the original on 12 October 2025.
- Silwood, Anas; Malik, Jaafar (12 February 2026). "A Message from SHUKR's Founders". Shukr Fashion. Archived from the original on 2 March 2026.
- Tarlo, Emma (2016). "Re-Fashioning the Islamic: Young Visible Muslims". In Hamid, Sadek (ed.). Young British Muslims: Between Rhetoric and Realities. Routledge. pp. 151–169. doi:10.4324/9781315546070. ISBN 978-1-315-54607-0.
- Tarlo, Emma (2019). "Islamic Fashion Scape". In Barnard, Malcolm (ed.). Fashion Theory: A Reader (2nd ed.). Routledge. pp. 374–388. ISBN 978-1-138-29693-0.
- Wheeler, Kayla Renée (2021). "Constructing the 'Muslim Woman' in Advertising". In Howe, Justine (ed.). The Routledge Handbook of Islam and Gender. Routledge Handbooks. Routledge. pp. 423–434. ISBN 978-0-815-36777-2.
- Y-Sing, Liau; Solovieva, Daria (9 April 2015). "Islamic Fashion's Expanding Market Attracts Shariah Financiers". Bloomberg.
