= Son Taek-su =

South Korean poet and editor (born 1970)

Son Taek-su (born 1970) is a South Korean poet and editor.

== Life ==
Poet Son Taek-su was born in 1970 in Damyang, South Jeolla Province. He grew up in Busan, and graduated from Kyungnam University for Korean Literature, and then from Busan University Graduate School. After he graduated from high school, he worked at a place that took care of the blind. Here he thought it would be good to read them writing that had rhythm, so he began reading them poetry. This was when he first came to know poetry. Later, he worked as an editor at publishing houses, Jaeum & Moeum Publishing, and Ijibook. He was also the president of Silcheon Munhak. He began his literary career in 1998 as his poem "Eondeok wi-ui bulgeun byeokdoljib" (언덕 위의 붉은 벽돌집 The Red Brick House Atop A Hill) won the Korea Times New Writer's Contest and the Kookje Shinmun New Writer's Contest in the same year. After his first poetry collection Horangi baljaguk (호랑이 발자국 A Tiger's Footsteps) (Changbi, 2003), he published Mokryeonjeoncha (목련전차 The Magnolia Streetcar) (Changbi, 2006), Namu-ui susahak (나무의 수사학 The Rhetoric of the Tree) (Silcheon Munhak, 2010), and Seoncheonseong Geurium (선천성 그리움 Congenital Longing) (Munhakui Jeondang, 2013). He also published an essay collection Dasi huimang-e maleul geolda (다시 희망에 말을 걸다 Talking to Hope Again) (Gongjeo, Book Ocean, 2013). He won the 2nd Busan Writer's Award in 2002, the 9th Hyundae Poet's Award in 2003, the 22nd Sin Dong-yup Creative Writing Prize in 2004, the 2nd Yuksasi Literature Prize for New Writers in 2005, the 3rd Aeji Literature Prize in the same year, the 14th Isu Literature Prize in 2007, the 3rd Imhwa Literature Prize in 2011, and the 13th Nojak Literature Prize in 2013.

== Writing ==
Poet Son Taek-su writes upon agricultural sentiment and imagination, continuing the history of traditional lyric poetry, while creating a beautiful poetic universe that reveals delicate sensibility and lyrical beauty. He was praised for promoting poetic renewal as he expressed the joys and sorrows of urban life while maintaining the point of view of traditional lyrical poetry. He calmly examines the flip side of life with acute senses and keen insight, showing the detailed sights of life. His early poems, published in his first collection Horangi baljaguk (호랑이 발자국 A Tiger's Footsteps; 2003), shows well the poet's eyes that observe the lives around him, while approaching the deep places of life centered on his family, including himself. Such poetic tendencies are more concretely expanded in his second collection, Mokryeonjeoncha (목련전차 The Magnolia Streetcar; 2006). In this collection, with backgrounds such as the soil, the ocean, and the port, he projected his poverty ridden days of adolescence into a poetic imagery. Moreover, Son Taek-su has moved onto writing works that are of finding out about Buddhist concepts along with mystical stories from fables or legends, laying out a deeper poetic universe. Such worldview is still being passed down in his most recent poetry collection, Tteodoneun meonjideuli bitnanda (떠도는 먼지들이 빛난다 The Drifting Dust Are Shining). His poems, in their description of the realization of the laws of nature, and the meaning of life, they are well deserving of being called a strong support for Korea's traditional lyric poetry.

== Works ==
=== Poetry collections ===
- Horangi baljaguk (호랑이 발자국 A Tiger's Footsteps) (Changbi, 2003)
- Mokryeonjeoncha (목련전차 The Magnolia Streetcar) (Changbi, 2006)
- Namu-ui susahak (나무의 수사학 The Rhetoric of the Tree) (Silcheon Munhak, 2010)
- Tteodoneun meonjideuli bitnanda (떠도는 먼지들이 빛난다 The Drifting Dust Are Shining) (Changbi, 2014)

=== Other ===
- Gyosil bakeuro geoleo na-on si (교실 밖으로 걸어 나온 시 The Poem That Stepped Out of the Classroom) (Silcheon Munhak, 2012)

=== Works in translation ===
- Lacquer-Tree Chicken (English)

== Awards ==
- 2002 2nd Busan Writer's Award
- 2003 9th Hyundae Poet's Award
- 2004 22nd Sin Dong-yup Creative Writing Prize
- 2005 2nd Yuksasi Literature Prize for New Writers
- 2005 3rd Aeji Literature Prize
- 2007 14th Isu Literature Prize
- 2007 Today's Young Artists Award
- 2011 3rd Imhwa Literature Prize
- 2013 13th Nojak Literature Prize
