= Haruehun Airry =

Thai photographer

- Born: Haruehun Noppawan; September 6, 1986 (age 39)
- Known for: Photography
- Website: www.haruehun.com

Haruehun Noppawan (Thai: หฤหรรษ์ นพวรรณ; born September 6, 1986), better known by Haruehun Airry, is a Thai photographer living in Bangkok, Thailand.

== Biography ==
Haruehun graduated with a Bachelor of Arts in Communication Management from Chulalongkorn University where he was friends with Charm Osathanond, Miss Thailand Universe 2006, and began photographing her. As a role model for young men in Thailand, he was appointed by the Thai Red Cross AIDS Research Centre an advocate for a charity project called Adam's Love which fosters comprehensive HIV/AIDS education in 2011.

== Career ==
His photography, mainly of men, has been published widely on Asian social media since he was a student, and later in the publications Attitude and Men's Health. A number of amateur male models in various countries have been introduced to the entertainment industry through his photography. Haruehun Airry stirred public opinion when his nude photography series featuring a former Mister International titleholder was published.

Attitude magazine, in its first Thai language issue, noted that Haruehun Airry is one of the youngest successful photographers.

== See also ==
- Jiho Lee
