= Jiho Lee =

South Korean male model (born 1985)

- Born: Jiho Lee; July 29, 1985 (age 41); Seoul, South Korea
- Occupations: Model and Fitness Instructor
- Years active: 2011–present
- Height: 5 ft 10 in (1.78 m)

Korean name
- Hangul: 이지호
- Hanja: 李智虎
- RR: I Jiho
- MR: I Chiho

Jiho Lee (born July 29, 1985) is a South Korean male model.

== Biography ==
Lee was born in Seoul, South Korea. When he was young, he moved to Syracuse, New York because of his parents' job and became a fluent English speaker. He attended college at Korea National Sport University where he earned a degree in physical education.

== Career ==
Lee officially appeared as a professional model through photography by Haruehun Airry and quickly became widely recognized even though he in fact began fitness modeling a few years before. He then modeled for some of the biggest names in fashion industry such as attitude, Kenneth Cole and ELLE Fashion Week. Lee currently writes a fitness column and models for L'Officiel Hommes Korea where he acts as a magazine contributor. Determined by public voting through SMS, Lee was awarded the Straight Guy of the Year 2011 by attitude Thailand.

== See also ==
- Haruehun Airry
