= Islamic clothing =

Customs of clothing associated with Islam

Islamic clothing is the style of dress interpreted and presented as conforming to (or required by) Islamic teachings. While it's assumed that there are rules for men, the most common and compelling forms of dress are found in women's clothing. Another aspect of this clothing is its role in segregation between men and women which manifests itself in certain situations and usage patterns.

Muslims wear a wide variety of clothing, which is influenced not only by religious considerations, but also by practical, cultural, social, and political factors. In modern times, some Muslims have adopted clothing based on Western traditions, while others wear modern forms of traditional Muslim dress, which over the centuries has typically included long, flowing garments. Besides the practical advantages provided in the climate of the Middle East, loose-fitting clothing is also generally regarded as conforming to Islamic teachings, which stipulate that body areas which are considered sexual in nature must be hidden from public view. Traditional dress for Muslim men has typically covered at least the head and the area between the waist and the knees, while women's islamic dress typically conceals the hair and the body from the ankles to the neck. Some Muslim women also cover their face, while others believe that the Quran strictly mandate that women need to wear a hijab or a burqa.

The veil re-emerged as a topic of conversation in the 1990s amid growing concern regarding potential Western influence on Muslim practices in Islamic countries. There are also many different forms of hijab. For example, the Iranian chador consists of fabric made into a half-circle and worn around the head, leaving only the face exposed while covering the rest of the body. There is also the niqab, a long garment which covers everything except the eyes, while a burqa covers the entire face and body. The jilbab is a type of loose-fitting coat. In addition, the principles of veiling are not universal, with differing conventions based on different interpretations of the Quran. Because of this, what is acceptable as properly modest in one region may not be considered so in another.

The branch of the fashion industry influenced by Islamic principles or incorporating elements of traditional Islamic dress is known as Islamic fashion.

== Rationale and definitions ==
Islamic precepts related to modesty (haya) are at the base of Islamic clothing. Adherents of Islam believe that it is the religious duty of adult Muslim men and women to dress modestly, as an obligatory ruling agreed upon by community consensus.

Veiling is a custom that is traditionally practiced to sustain piety. Veiling may act as a deterrent from others’ influencing Muslims in a way that makes them compromise their faith and religious observance. It also may support Muslims’ adherence to their faith via being a physical symbol of religiosity. Some women choose to veil in order to protect themselves from unwanted male attention. In addition, wearing hijab is also a chosen practice amongst many American Muslim women.

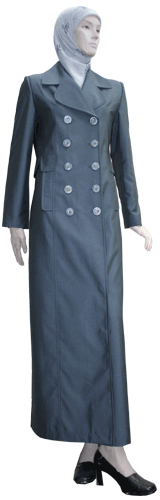
Example of a jilbab

Modesty is not unilateral. Some believe that a robe with long sleeves, the jilbab ought to be worn by men as well as women. In addition, some believe men should cover up to their wrists and neck whether or not in Western dress, and that not doing so is immodest. In addition, the moral reputation of men and women can be negatively impacted by excessive displays of one's body. According to the traditional view in Sunni Islam, men must cover from their belly buttons to their knees, though they differ on whether this includes covering the navel and knees or only what is between them. Women have traditionally been encouraged to cover most of their body except for their hands and faces.

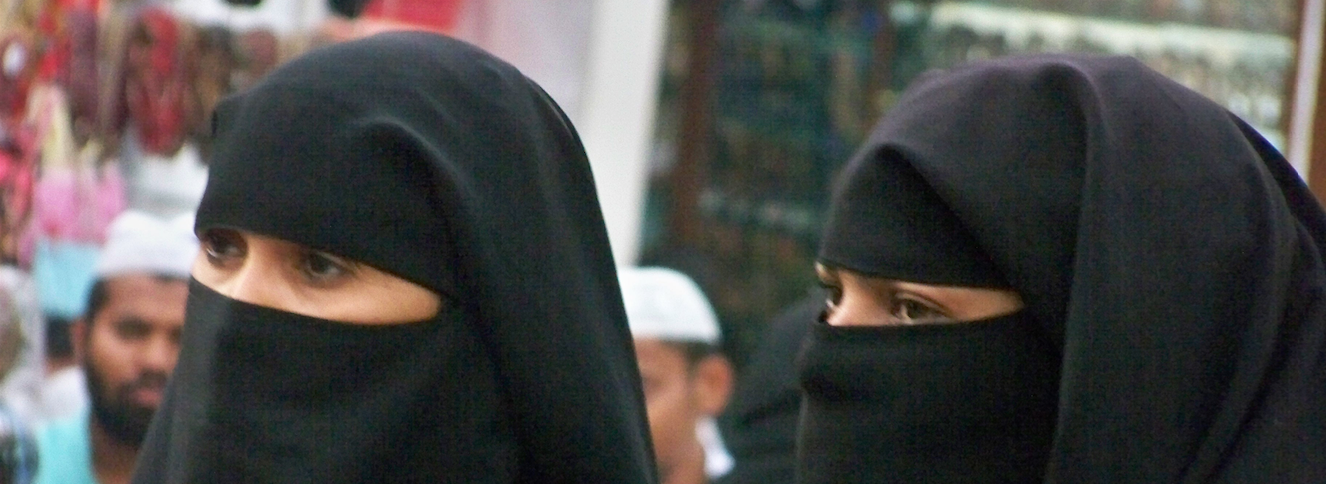
Example of niqab worn by women in Hyderabad, India

Modesty is usually a theme of islamic clothing. Modesty is known as hijab in Arabic. Veiling is commonly seen as a religious practice and is supported by passages in the Quran that detail the importance of covering the head and body in order to be modest. An Arabic word strongly associated with Islamic clothing and haya is khimar (خمار), which translates into English as "veil".

=== Muslim women's views on hijab ===
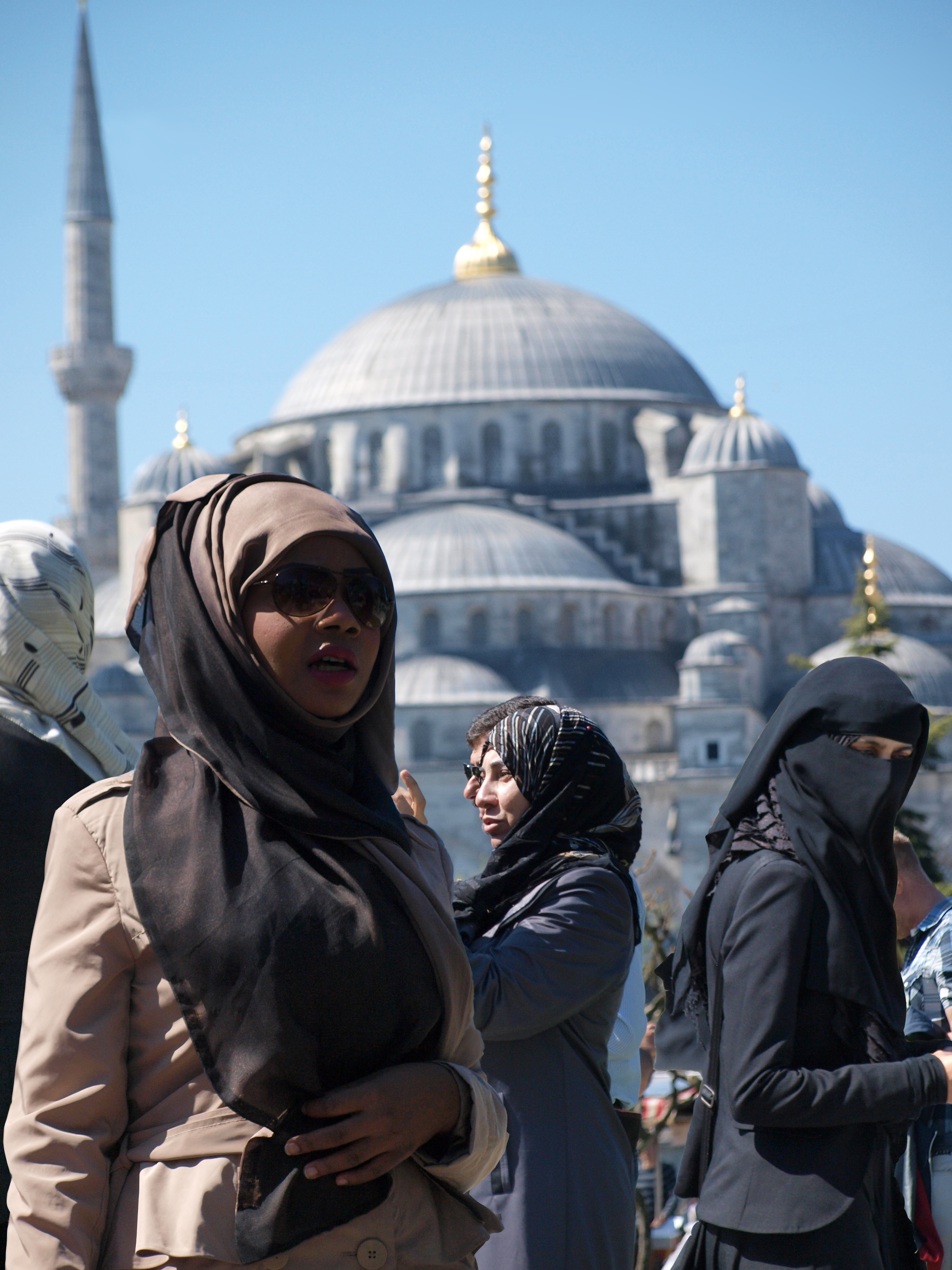
Muslim women by Islamic dress code, wearing hijab and niqab.

Islamic clothing has roots not only in religion but also in older cultural traditions. For example "what today is labeled as "Islamic" conservative dress actually has cultural roots dating back before the time of the Prophet." This emphasizes that Islamic clothing also reflects historical and cultural practices that go beyond religion. For example, "in Assyria and other Eastern Mediterranean and Asian territories, such dress indicated a woman's societal rank, as wearing clothing that comports with modern definitions of hijab reflected that a woman was married or a member of elite." Today's Islamic clothing concept is inspired by two sources, the Quran and hadith. The Quran provides guiding principles believed to have come from God, while the body of hadith describes a human role model attributed to the Islamic prophet Muhammad.

==== Pro-hijab ====
Muslim women do not necessarily view the hijab as an oppressive garment that is forced upon them. Iran is a country with strict rules on the hijab, and many women feel pressured from the government to dress in a certain style.

==== Anti-hijab ====
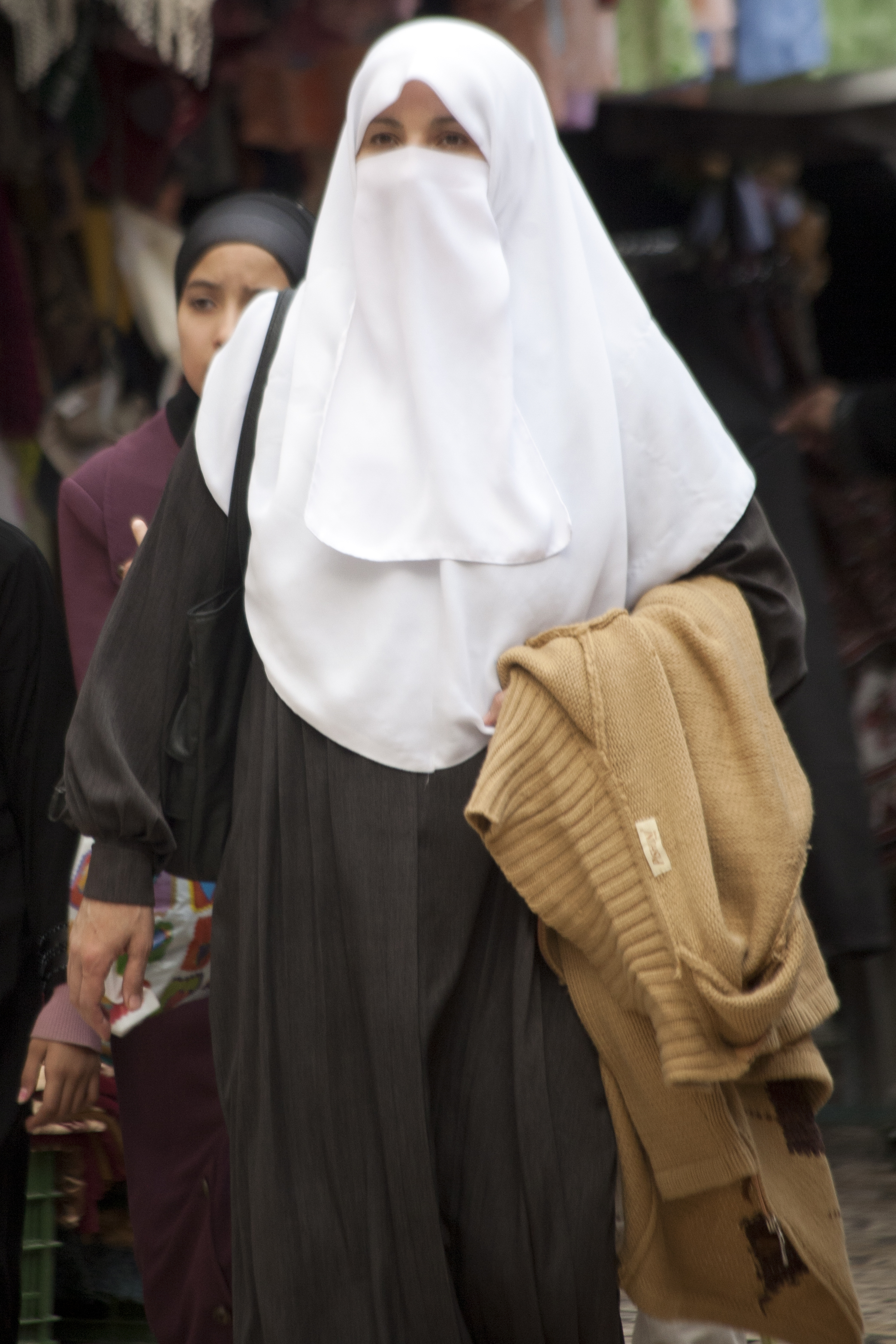
Muslim woman in niqab

There are many Muslim women who believe that the hijab indeed hinders their personal freedom as a woman. Another belief of some women that wear the hijab is that it could potentially "strip them of their individuality" and turn them into a figurehead for their religion. Some women do not want to have to deal with this on a daily basis, and it is another reason that some Muslim women have decided to un-veil themselves.

== Hijab and policies by country ==
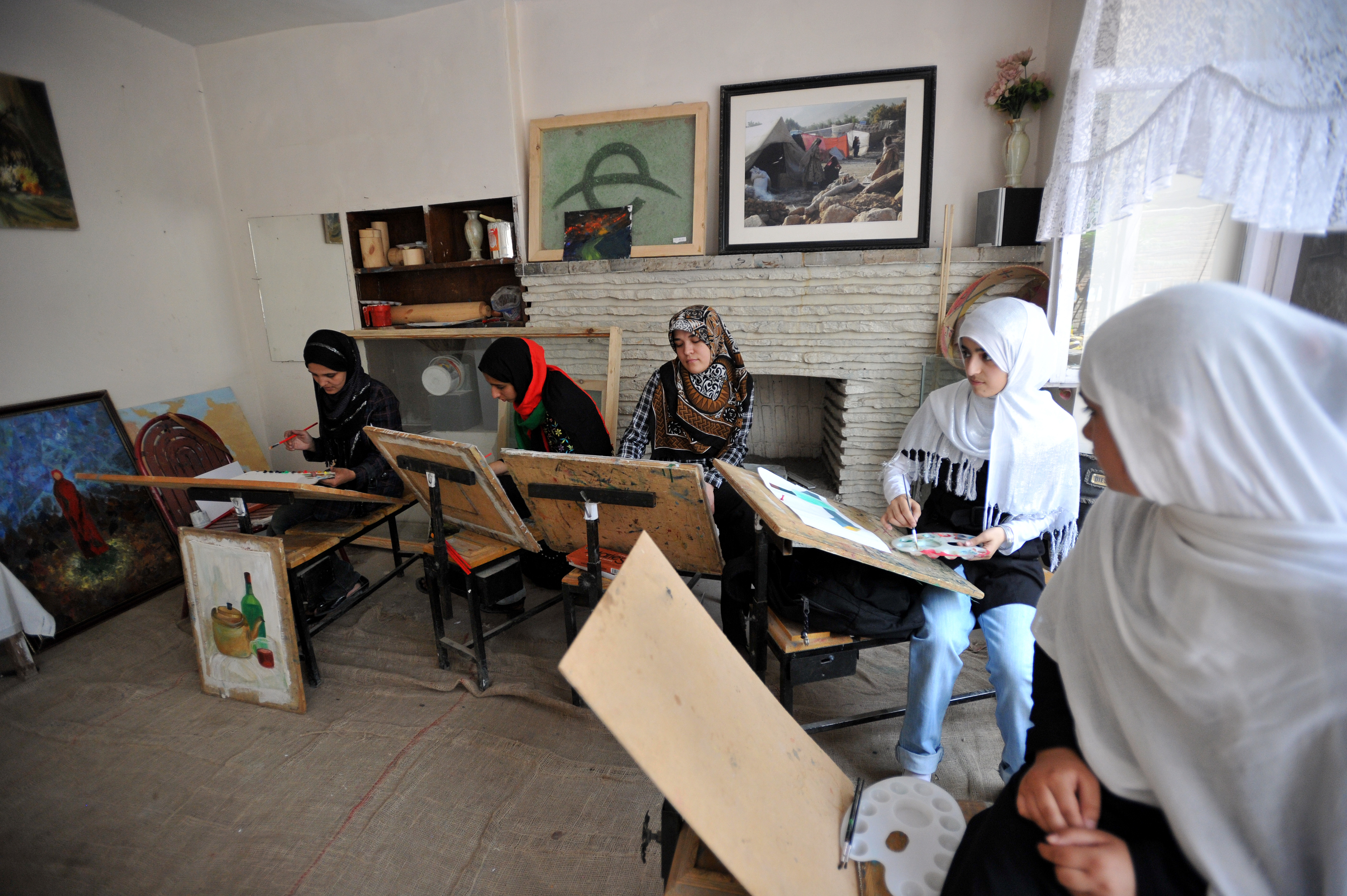
Female art students in Afghanistan

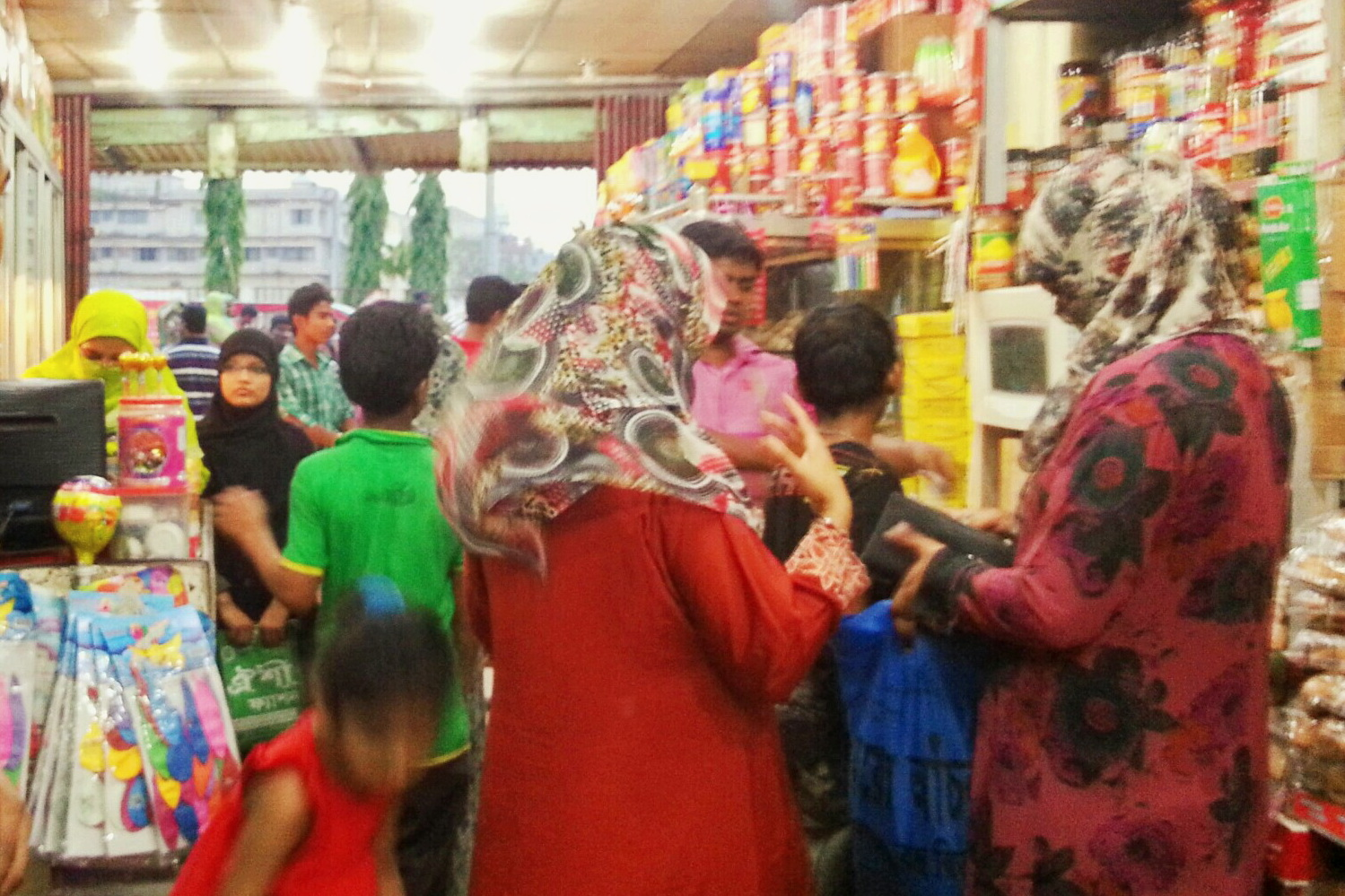
Hijab-wearing Bangladeshi women shopping at a department store in Comilla, Bangladesh

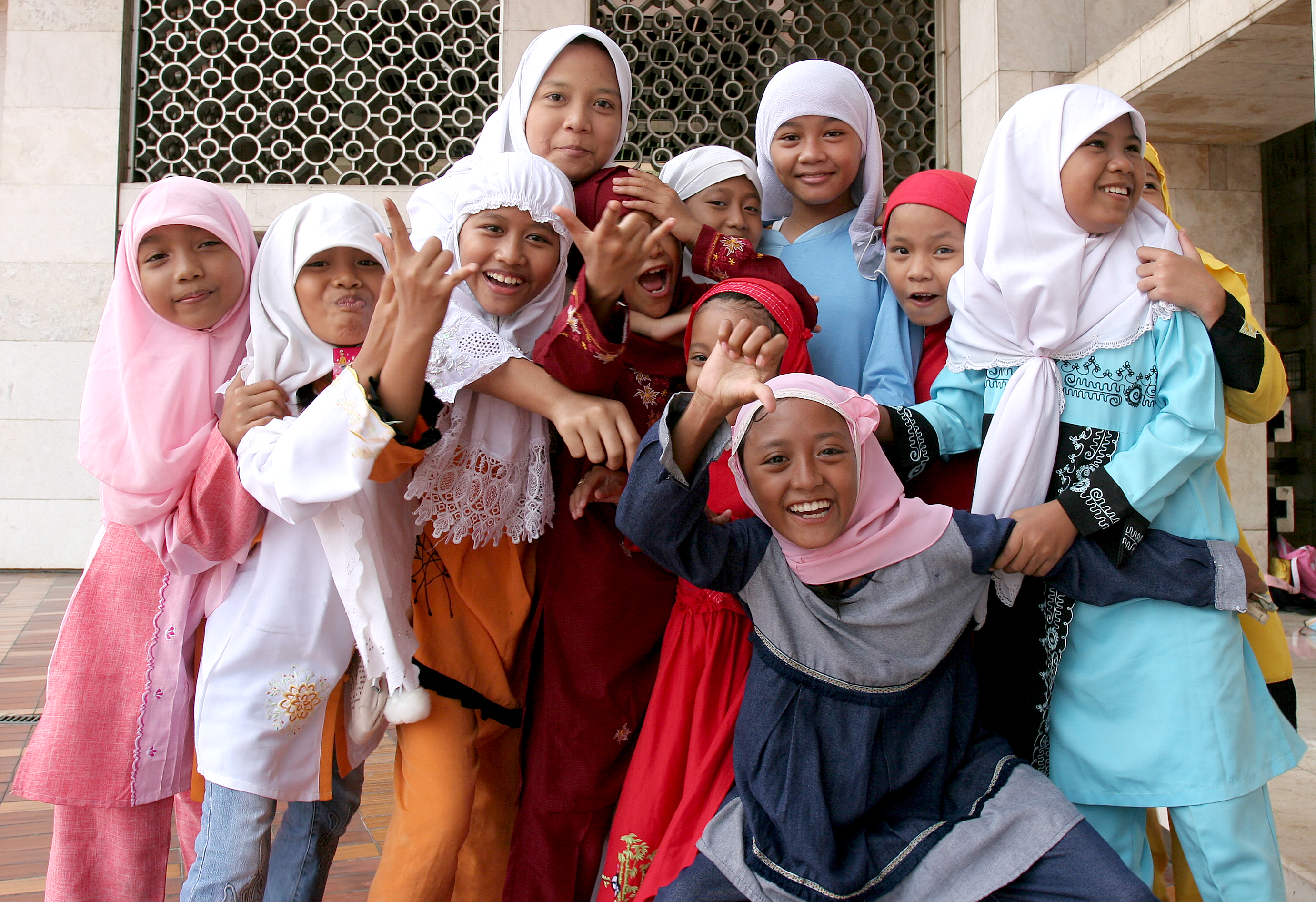
Muslim girls at Istiqlal Mosque in Jakarta, Indonesia

Islamic clothing is represented differently in Western and non-Western countries, with varying styles and significance depending on cultural, social, and religious background. In non-Western countries, Islamic clothing is seen as a symbol of modesty, respect, and faith. It significantly connects to religious identity and traditional values. Over the years, Islamic clothing has evolved to represent not only religious values and modesty but also modern fashion. Garments commonly associated with Islamic dress include the hijab, a headscarf covering the hair and neck. A face veil called niqab covers the lower part of the face, leaving only the eyes visible. There is also a long flowing loose fitting black robe which is called abaya that is sometimes worn over regular clothes covers from shoulders to ankles. A Burqa is similar to the abaya; it's loose fitting and covers the full body; however, it also includes a mesh piece of cloth that covers the face.

Over time Islamic clothing has evolved in meaning, style and purpose in western countries like Egypt, Morocco and Saudi Arabia. In the 1970s Islamic clothing in Egypt was used against westernized lifestyles. During this time, wearing Islamic clothing expressed cultural pride, resisting against western influence and a connection to religion. The perception about Islamic clothing has shifted significantly, balancing modesty with western fashion norms while still expressing their religious identity.

=== Eurasia ===
==== Turkey ====
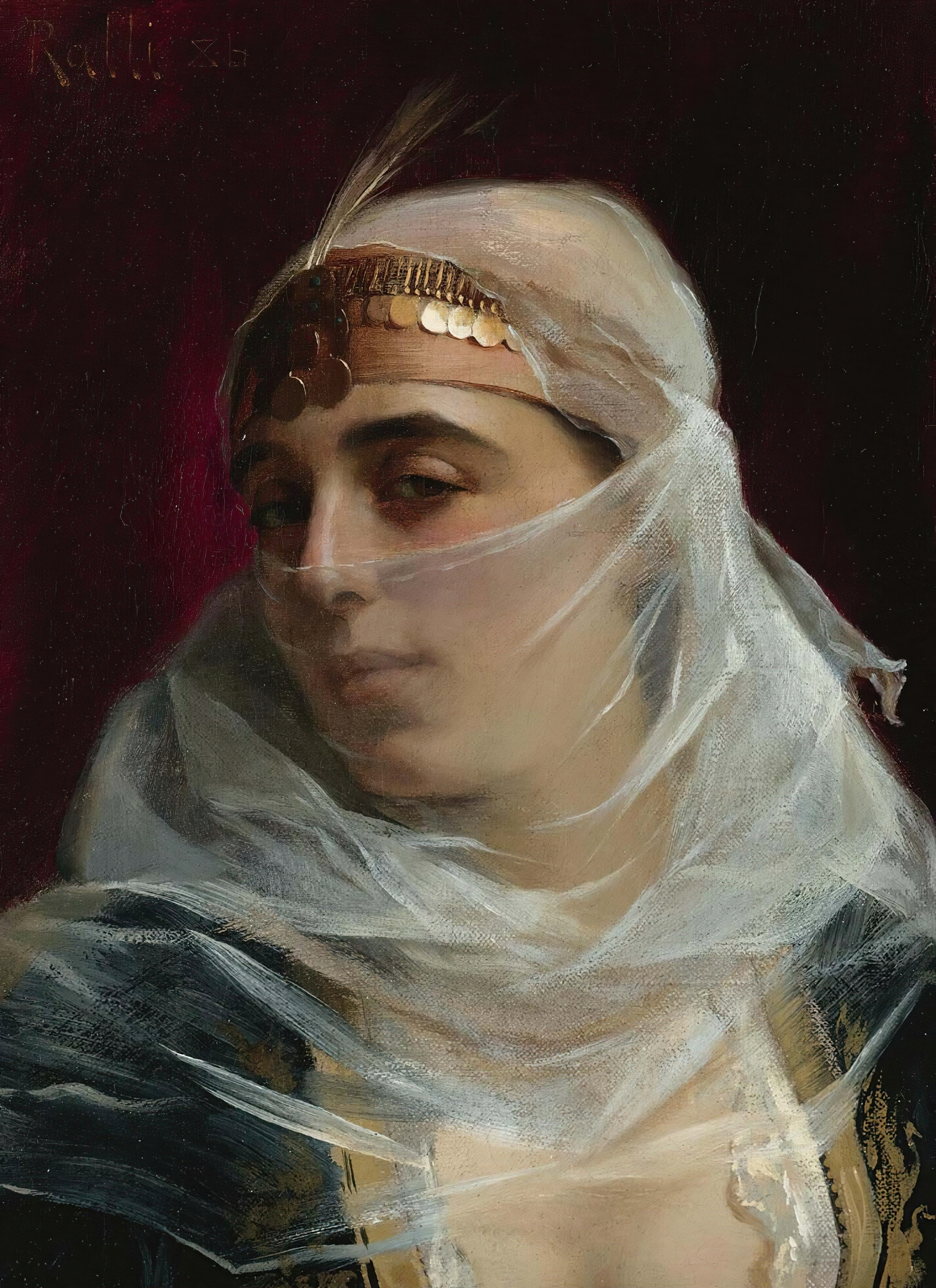
Turkish Woman by Théodore Ralli (1852–1909), depicts her in yaşmak

Mustafa Kemal Atatürk was the founding father of modern-day Turkey and the start of secularism within the Turkish Republic. His one of the steps towards secularism and Westernization was to ban an item called the fez, a red cap that mandated for Westernization by Mahmud II (1827) in his era, as a modern headdress for his new army, the Asakir-i Mansure-i Muhammediye. He followed that by banning all forms of religious dress outside of places of worship. While Türkiye's modernization project, led by Atatürk, introduced a law requiring hats in men's clothing and encouraged a modern understanding of women's attire, no laws were enacted that mandated or prohibited women's clothing. A 1935 circular from the Ministry of the Interior is the only decree that placed restrictions on women's clothing, including a ban on clothing that covered women's faces. However, the regulations governing the general dress code of civil servants did not specifically recognize the veil, and this was perceived as a headscarf ban, occasionally leading to problems between women who wanted to wear headscarves and their administrators. A law passed in the 1980s that allowed civil servants working in public institutions to wear headscarves in their workplaces became a visible ban and gained legal status with the court decision of the Council of State, which ruled that the regulation was constitutional on the grounds that "wearing the headscarf is not only an innocent practice but is also in the process of becoming a symbol of an understanding that is contrary to women's freedoms and the fundamental principles of the Republic." This restricted women from wearing the hijab and veil while working in public places despite a majority population by 76%. The ban was officially lifted again in 2013 by the Justice and Development Party (AKP) with new regulations that still banned the hijab for women in military, judiciary and police systems. The restriction on policewomen was lifted in 2016 allowing them to wear the hijab while following uniform regulations (plain and same color as uniform).

=== South Asia ===
==== Pakistan ====
In Pakistan, the topic of the hijab is extraordinarily controversial. The veil is constantly a topic of debate and has been for decades now. The Pew Research Center gathered information on several countries, including Pakistan, and came back with results on how people's perceptions of the veil differ across the world. Participants were given pictures of six women wearing different styles of veil along with the question: "What Style of Dress is Appropriate for Women in Public?". The results found that: "In Pakistan, there is an even split (31% vs. 32%) between woman #3 and woman #2, who is wearing a niqab that exposes only her eyes, while nearly a quarter (24%) choose woman #4." The results show that there is still a lot of debate about what type of dress women perceive to be most appropriate, and it seems that the debate will continue to go on for many years to come.

=== Middle East ===
==== Egypt ====
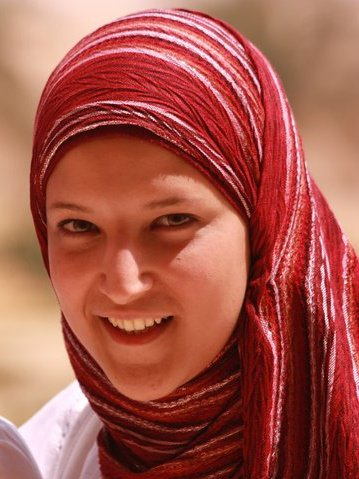
Reem, an Egyptian young lady wearing the Egyptian style of the Hijab, in 2010.

On 8 January 2014, the Pew Research Center conducted a survey of Muslim women in various countries. An overwhelming eighty-nine percent of Egyptian women who responded to the survey believed that women should show their face in public. Ten percent of the survey participants believed that women should be fully veiled when in public. Compared to other countries, Egypt is not as conservative as others, but only fourteen percent of the women surveyed believed that Egyptian women should be able to choose their own clothing. Compared to six other countries, Egypt was last in this category; the statistic (eighty-four percent) suggests that Egyptian women (according to that single survey), do not believe that women should have freedom to choose their clothing. Meanwhile, in Egyptian media, women have always spoken about their freedom and right to wear whatever they want and that no one should be judged based on their outfits.

==== Saudi Arabia ====
Niqab is most often used in Saudi Arabia, along with Hijab. While some perceive Niqab to be mandatory, Hijab is seen as a more modern style of clothing. Niqab is also revered as a conservative and modest clothing due to the deeply religious and cultural values. While opinion surveys in Saudi Arabia suggests a strong belief that women should be covered, paradoxically there is also a strong belief that women should have the right to choose what they wear.

A survey done in 2011 by the Pew Research Center asked women of different Muslim countries to choose which of several dresses they think are most appropriate for their country. Among Saudi women, 11% of women said a fully headed burqa is most appropriate, 63% of women said the niqab that only exposes the eyes is appropriate, only 8% said a black hijab covering the hair and ears is appropriate, 10% said a less conservative white hijab covering the hair and ears is appropriate, a small 5% said an even less conservative hijab that is brown and shows some hair is appropriate and a mere 3% said not wearing any covering was appropriate. The niqab is the dress that the highest percent of Saudi women felt was appropriate dress for women in Saudi Arabia. In accordance with these statistics, the Saudi woman that is used in the video, cited above, to show the popular view of Saudi women was wearing this niqab that only exposed her eyes.

==== Syria ====
In 2011, Syrian President Bashar al-Assad reversed a decision that bans teachers from wearing the niqab. The move was seen as an attempt to appease Salafis as he faced down the uprising challenging his secular rule. As a symbol of political Islam, the government had banned the niqab in July 2010. Syria was the latest in a string of nations from Europe to the Middle East to weigh in on the niqab, perhaps the most visible symbol of fundamentalist Sunni Islam.

==== Palestine ====
In Gaza, Palestinian jihadists belonging to the Unified Leadership (UNLU) have rejected a hijab policy that make veiling a legal obligation for women.

=== Africa ===
==== Somalia ====
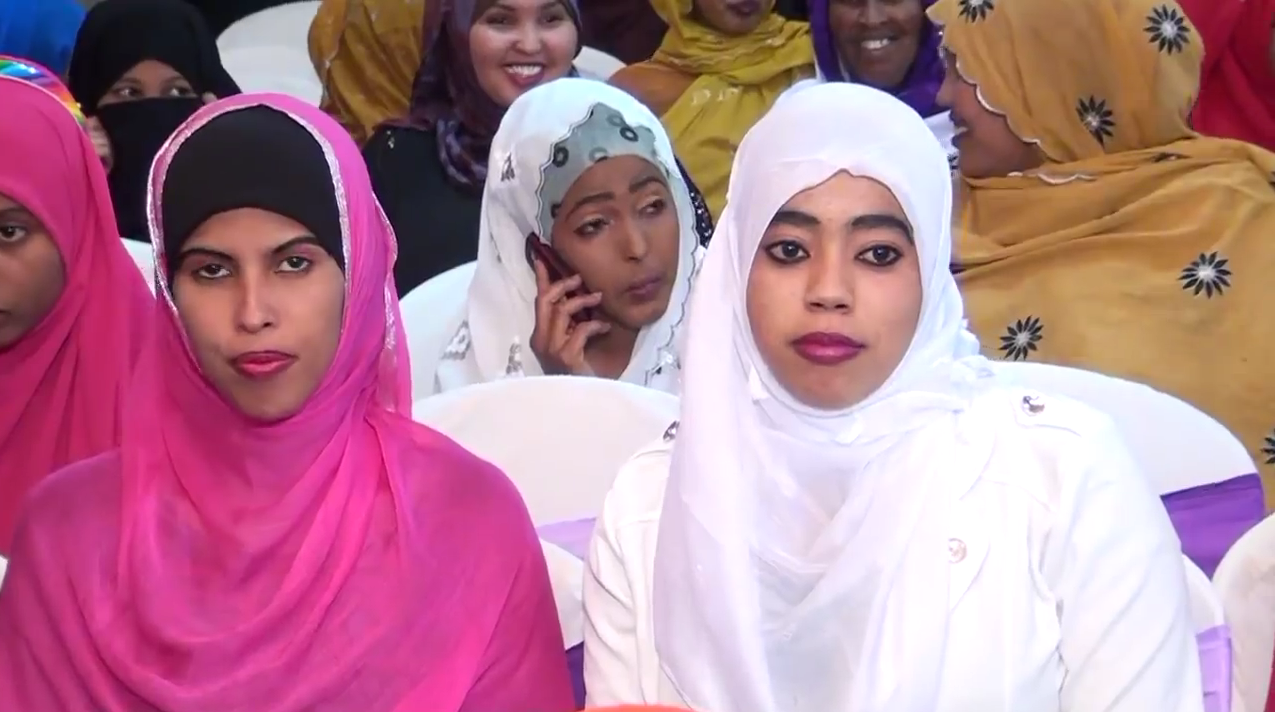
Young Somali women wearing the hijab

During regular, day-to-day activities, Somali women usually wear the guntiino, a long stretch of cloth tied over the shoulder and draped around the waist. In more formal settings such as weddings or religious celebrations like Eid, women wear the dirac, which is a long, light, diaphanous voile dress made of cotton or polyester that is worn over a full-length half-slip and a brassiere. Married women tend to sport head-scarves referred to as shash, and also often cover their upper body with a shawl known as garbasaar. Unmarried or young women, however, do not always cover their heads. Traditional Arabian garb such as the hijab and the jilbab is also commonly worn.

=== Islamic dress in Europe ===
Clothing adhering to Islamic rulings, specifically the niqab, burqa, and head coverings (hijab) often worn by Muslim women, are visible and greatly debated symbols of Islam in Western Europe. This highly politicized and debated dress has led to several countries placing legal restrictions on clothing such as niqab and burqa. Often justified in terms of security, integration, and secularism, these restrictions limit the use of veiling, head coverings and niqab in public spheres. In Banning Islamic Veils: Is Social Cohesion (or Living Together) a Valid Argument?, Paul says that one argument that is often made to justify these bans is that the veil increases "societal divide" and showcases a disregard for the values of the country Muslims live in.

These ideas and policies have received mixed reactions from populations. Supporters of the bans argue that the laws are upholding public safety and values of the West, whereas critics argue that it is limiting religious freedom and further preventing women from being included in society. Although focusing on hijab, often these issues are related to the broader debates on immigration, national identity, and the separation of religion and state in these societies. The opinions on this continue to be divided as many people support the right of religious freedom including dressing; others see this as an obstacle for integration and as gender inequality.

Ayaan Hirsi Ali sees Islam as incompatible with Western values, at least in its present form. She advocates the values of "Enlightenment liberalism", including secularism and equality of women. For her, the burqa or chador is both a symbol of religious obscurantism and the oppression of women. Western Enlightenment values, in her view, require prohibition, regardless of whether a woman has freely chosen Islamic dress. Islamic dress is also seen as a symbol of the existence of parallel societies, and the failure of integration: in 2006 British Prime Minister Tony Blair described it as a "mark of separation". Visible symbols of a non-Christian culture conflict with the national identity in European states, which assumes a shared (non-religious) culture. Proposals for a ban may be linked to other related cultural prohibitions: the Dutch politician Geert Wilders proposed a ban on hijabs, Islamic schools, new mosques, and non-western immigration.

==== France ====
France, and other European nations, have experienced some controversy over Islamic clothing, as they associate it with women's oppression. An example of one such controversy is the burkini ban, a law set in France in 2016, which prohibited people from wearing burkinis. A burkini is a full-body swimsuit worn mostly by Muslim women that allows them to enjoy swimming while following their religious beliefs about modesty. However, French authorities saw the burkini as a threat, believing that it could challenge or change France's cultural norms and values. “French leaders labeled the burkini as a “symbol of Islamic Extremism” that enslaves and “hide[s] women’s bodies in order to better control them.” In response to questions on the need for the ban, French officials presented a variety of defenses, including concerns for disruption to public order, hygiene, and “decency.”

In France, French authorities view the hijab worn by Muslim women as a threat to their country's values. They believe it symbolizes extremism because "it's viewed as a tangible sign of intolerable difference." According to Scott, the hijab challenges the idea of republican universalism, the French political idea that everyone is treated equally in public without showing religious or cultural differences. However, the author emphasizes how French authorities fear expressed religion could weaken French values, unity and secularism. Public schools are seen as a place where French values are taught, so they believe it will destroy the rule of secularism. The controversy over Islamic clothing, particularly the hijab reveals a deeper conflict between France's secular ideals and its diverse population. Historian Scott argues that not all Muslim women who wear the hijab do so for religious reasons. She states "the controversy over the wearing of headscarves is symptomatic of a much larger problem, one that seems irresolvable within the context of republican universalism. That is the problem of reconciling the fact of the growing diversity of the French population (most of the Muslims in question in these affairs are French citizens) with a theory of citizenship and representation that defines the recognition of difference as antithetical to the unity of the nation." With the growth of the Islamic population in France, the country has struggled to balance its desire for diversity with its own cultural values.

France is not alone in its views regarding Islamic dress. In fact, many western countries often misunderstand Islamic clothing by viewing it as only a symbol of oppression.“Western societies’ general reluctance to directly engage with Islam—and the misinterpretations and Islamophobia resulting therefrom—has created a tension between Western feminism and Islam, as it correctly assumes that Islam innately promotes women’s oppression.”

==== Germany ====
An administrative court in Munich has prohibited a Muslim student from wearing a facial veil in class." Although Germany does not have an official ban on the hijab, according to the nation's highest courts federal states have permission to ban Muslim state employees wearing clothing they deem inappropriate. This rule leaves flexibility for German legislators to essentially make their own rules concerning clothing/dress in the country.

A German Muslim woman has been barred from working as a lay judge because she wears a headscarf which was alleged to be in violation of the requirement of neutrality. The matter is now before the constitutional court.

==== Austria ====
In 2017, a legal ban on covering one's face in public (primarily targeting Islamic clothing such as burqa and niqab) was adopted by the Austrian parliament. Additionally, on 16 May 2019, the Austrian parliament placed a ban on "ideologically or religiously influenced clothing which is associated with the covering of the head" in primary schools. This ban directly bans traditional headscarves worn by Muslim women worldwide.

==== Belgium ====
On 31 March 2010 the Belgian Chamber Committee on the Interior unanimously approved legislation instating a nationwide ban on wearing the burqa in public. The proposal was accepted by the Chamber of Representatives on 27 April 2010 with only two abstentions from Flemish Socialist MPs.

==== Netherlands ====
The Dutch government parliament in January 2012 enacted a ban on face-covering clothing, popularly described as the "burqa ban". Offenders can be fined up to 390 euro. The prohibition does not apply to face covering that is necessary for the health, safety or the exercise of a profession or practicing a sport. Excluded from the ban are also events such as Sinterklaas, Carnival, Halloween or when a mayor granted an exemption for a particular event. Also excluded from prohibition are places and buildings intended for religious purposes. The prohibition does not apply to passengers in airplanes and airports who are traveling through the Netherlands to their final destination.

==== Bulgaria ====
In 2016, a legal ban on face-covering Islamic clothing was adopted by the Bulgarian parliament.

==== Latvia ====
In 2015 Latvia started debates to forbid face-covering clothing with proposed fines up to 150 euro for covering face in public and up to 350 euro for forcing someone to cover face in public. Government of Latvia agreed on the law only in 2017, and forwarded it to Saeima for final confirmation. Since 2018 process has not moved forward and law is not confirmed and operational yet. There are almost no women in Latvia who cover their face and many have pointed out that such law would be redundant.

=== Hijab in the Americas ===
==== United States ====
Most Muslim women in the United States wear hijab at least some of the time. Contrary to popular theories about assimilation, this number is in fact higher among native-born Muslim women compared to first-generation Muslim immigrants.

There are no legal restrictions on Islamic modesty garb in the United States, due to universal religious freedom protections in American law. For example, the Supreme Court of the United States ruled against Abercrombie and Fitch when they refused to hire a woman named Samantha Elauf on account of her wearing hijab, stating that the dress code policy violated Elauf's religious freedom.

As most gyms, fitness clubs, and other workout facilities in the United States are mixed-sex, observant Muslim women must either avoid these facilities or exercise in hijab, which is often impractical. Individuals such as Maria Omar, director of media relations for the Islamic Food and Nutrition Council of America (IFANCA), have thus advised Muslim women to avoid these complexes entirely as being in conflict with Islamic norms.

==== Canada ====
In 2011, the Canadian government made it illegal for women to wear face-covering garments at citizenship ceremonies, because the judge must be able to see each person's face reciting their oath. In 2012, the Supreme Court issued a rare split decision on whether women could cover their faces in the witness box. Four judges said it depended on the circumstances, two said witnesses should never cover their face, and one said a Muslim witness should never be ordered to remove her veil. Canada is considering a wider ban on veils in government offices, schools, and hospitals. On 16 June 2019, the provincial government of French-speaking Quebec enacted the Act respecting the laicity of the State. The Act prohibits certain public servants from wearing religious regalia – including Muslim scarves and veils, turbans, Jewish skullcaps and Christian crucifixes.

==== South America ====
===== Argentina =====
In 2011 Argentinian President Cristina Fernández pushed for legislation which allowed for Muslim women to wear hijab in public places. According to the new law Argentine Muslim women can wear a hijab while being photographed for their national id cards. The law was created in order to help promote freedom of religion and expression in the country, and help the Muslim population, which is estimated to be between 450,000 and one million, feel more integrated into society.

===== Chile =====
Chile has a minority Muslim population. Fuad Mussa, the President of the Islamic Cultural Centre, is quoted as saying that "there is a general ignorance among Chileans about Islam." This was after a Chilean citizen was refused service at a bank because of her hijab in 2010, and would not be served until she removed her hijab.

== See also ==
- Awrah
- Blangkon
- Clothing laws by country
- Fez
- Taqiyah
- Thawb
- Zunnar
