= Sohn Kyung-han =

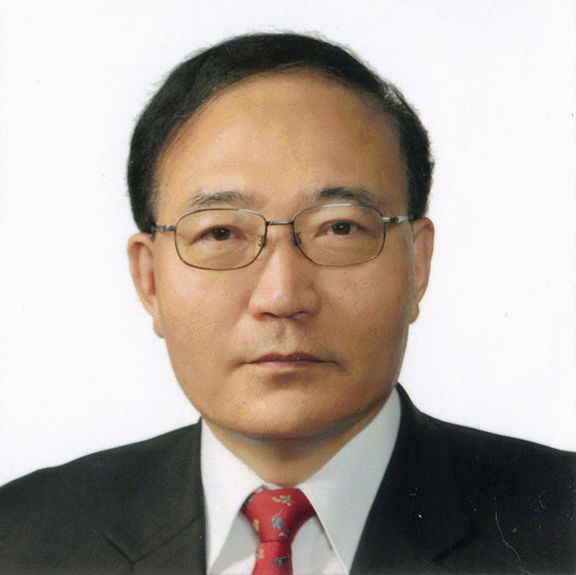
- Born: 22 March 1951 (age 75); Busan
- Citizenship: South Korea
- Education: Seoul National University
- Occupation: Defence attorney

Korean name
- Hangul: 손경한
- RR: Son Gyeonghan
- MR: Son Kyŏnghan

Sohn Kyung-han (born 22 March 1951) is a defence attorney and law professor based in Seoul, South Korea. Sohn is a specialist in intellectual property law, international trade law, technology law, information society law, sports law, entertainment law and international arbitration. Sohn is president of the Korean Intellectual Property Society and the Korea Private International Law Association, and a law professor at Sungkyunkwan University.

== Early life and education ==
Sohn was born in Busan, South Korea. He graduated from Busan High School, and received a bachelor's degree from the Seoul National University School of Law. While earning an LL.B in 1973 and an LL.M. in 1983 from SNU, he passed the Korean national bar exam and was admitted to the Korean and Seoul bar in 1979. Sohn then graduated from the University of Pennsylvania School of Law (LL.M, 1985; SJD abd, 1986), passed the New York bar in 1985 and became a member of the American Bar Association (1986–2000) and the New York State Bar Association (1998–). Sohn received an LL.D. from the Osaka University Graduate Program of Law in 2002 and was a research fellow at the Max Planck Institute (1988 and 2009). He spent one year at the UCLA as a visiting scholar in 2010–2011.

== Career ==
Sohn was the president of Korea International Trade Law Association and vice-president of the Korea Commercial Law Association, the Korea Association of Arbitration Studies and the Korea Patent Attorneys Association. He began his career at the Central International Law firm (1979–1988) and Bae, Kim & Lee (1988–1993). Sohn established the Aram International Law Firm (later Jung & Sohn), and has been a senior attorney since 1993.

He has been a pioneer in the field of intellectual property, patents and trademarks for over 20 years. Under Sohn's leadership, the electronic-commerce team of the Korea Institute of Technology and Law submitted the draft for the Framework Act on Electronic Commerce in 1998 to the Ministry of Trade, Industry and Energy. He has published a number of works in the fields of international trade law, intellectual property law, technology law, arbitration and entertainment law, including Science Technology Law (2010), Entertainment Law (2008), Game and Law (2006), Cyber Intellectual Property Law (2005), The International Jurisdiction and Governing Law for Intellectual Property Disputes (2009) and Alternative Dispute Resolution in Korea (2006). Sohn began his professorship at Myongji University (2005–06), and moved to Konkuk University (2006–07) before joining the Sungkyunkwan University Law School since 2007.

== Notable cases ==
In 1996 Sohn defended the Koram Plastic Corporation from charges of patent infringement filed by the Dow Chemical Company, invalidating patent on materials used for a car bumper. In 2001, he defended the Lotte Chilsung Beverage Company from charges of stealing the case design of Ballantine's.

== Publications ==
- The International Jurisdiction and Governing Law for Intellectual Property Disputes (2009)
- Entertainment Law in Korea (2008)
- Film Industry of Korea and Legal Problems Thereof (2008)
- Entertainment Law of Korea (ed. 2008)
- Arbitration of Intellectual Property Disputes (2007)
- Roles of Legal Professions in ADR (2007)
- The Concept of and Challenges to the Entertainment Law (2007)
- Alternative Dispute Resolution in Korea (2006)
- International Litigation in Korea (2006)
- Legal and Policy Aspects of Game Business in Korea (2004)
- Enforcement of Foreign Judgments in Korea (2003)
- Software Contracts and Dispute Resolution Thereof in Korea (2003)
- Jurisdiction and Choice of Laws in Cyberspace (2003)
- Legal Risk Management for Corporate CEOs (2002)
- Introduction to New Arbitration Act of Korea (2002)
- Dispute Resolution in Electronic Commerce (2002)
- Recognition and Enforcement of Foreign Judgment in Korea (2002)
- Dispute Resolution in Electronic Commerce (2002)
- The International Jurisdiction and Governing Law for Bills and Checks Under the New Private International Law of Korea (2001)
- Antitrust Considerations in Telecommunication Industry (1997)
- Protection of Information Technology in Korea (1996)
- Legal Aspects of the Korean Telecommunications Industry and Market (1992)
- Recognition and Enforcement of Foreign Judgments and Arbitral Awards in Korea (1991)
- Avoidance of Contract under the U.N. Convention on Contracts for the International Sale of Goods (1990)

== Awards ==
- Korea E-Business Grand Prize Prime Minister's Award (2002)
- Order of Merit, Camellia Medal (2005)
