= Reina Lewis =

British art historian

- Occupation: Art historian
- Notable work: Muslim Fashion: Contemporary Style Cultures

Reina Lewis (born 1963) is a British art historian and author. She is currently a Professor of Cultural Studies at the London College of Fashion at the University of the Arts London.

== Early life ==
Lewis was born in northeast London. She trained in Fine Art and Art History at the University of Leeds, and received her MA in English: Critical Theory from Sussex University. Her PhD in Humanities at Middlesex University on western women orientalist artists and writers marked a new development in understandings of gender and imperial cultures.

== Career ==
Lewis's research has focused upon postcolonial history, Middle Eastern and Ottoman women's history, lesbian and gay studies and studies of other minority groups. Her 2015 book Muslim Fashion drew on over ten years of research into the subject, in particular the use of the hijab as a fashion statement. The launch of the book was combined with a London College of Fashion panel discussion on "Muslim Fashion: recent histories, future directions". In 2016, she was an introducer for the foundation of the British Asian Fashion Network. A frequent media commentator, Lewis's writings and opinion have appeared across the global media in more recently The New York Times, Le Monde, The Guardian, The Times, and Marie Claire magazine, and she is regularly to be heard on BBC Radio 4.

Alongside authoring a number of seminal texts on gender and orientalism and queer visual culture, Lewis has also acted as consultant curator on the exhibition Contemporary Muslim Fashions at the Fine Arts Museums of San Francisco (September 2018 – January 2019, touring to Germany in spring 2019, and the Cooper Hewitt, Smithsonian Design Museum, New York (2020–21).

== Works ==
- Gendering Orientalism: Race, Femininity and Representation (1995) ISBN 0415124905
- Rethinking Orientalism: Women, Travel and the Ottoman Harem (2004) ISBN 1860647308
- Gender, Modernity & Liberty: Middle Eastern and Western Women's Writings: A Critical Sourcebook (2006) ISBN 9781860649578
- The poetics and politics of place: Ottoman Istanbul and British orientalism (2011) ISBN 9780295991108
- Modest fashion: styling bodies, mediating faith. Dress Cultures (2013) ISBN 9781780763828
- Muslim Fashion: Contemporary Style Cultures (2015) ISBN 978-0-8223-5914-2
- Uncovering Modesty: Dejabis and Dewigies Expanding the Parameters of the Modest Fashion Blogosphere (2015) ISSN 1362-704X

== Reports ==
- (Lewis R, Aune K, and Molokotos-Liederman L), Modest Fashion in UK Women’s Working Life: A report for fashion and the creative industries and creative arts education (2021) ISBN 9781906908669
- (Aune K, Lewis R, and Molokotos-Liederman L). Modest Fashion in UK Women’s Working Life: A report for employers, HR professionals, religious organisations, and policymakers (2021)ISBN 9781906908652
