= Huddersfield Literature Festival =

Annual literary festival in West Yorkshire, England

- Genre: Literary festival
- Locations: Huddersfield, England
- Years active: 2006–present
- Patrons: Sir Patrick Stewart OBE; Lemn Sissay MBE lisa luxx
- Website: http://www.huddlitfest.org.uk/

Huddersfield Literature Festival (HuddLitFest or HLF) is a community arts festival that takes place annually in the spring in Huddersfield, West Yorkshire, England.

== Introduction ==
HuddLitFest is a 10-day venue-based and digital literature festival of 50+ events, held in accessible spaces in Huddersfield and online. It includes author talks, performance poetry, workshops, discussion topics, wellbeing projects, family and multi-arts events, and a Schools Programme.

The Festival promotes community cohesion and offers opportunities to enjoy arts and culture to a wide range of people, with free and low-cost activities, innovative commissions inspired by local community partnerships, and proactive engagement with underrepresented creatives, performers and audiences.

Events take place online, outdoors and at a number of venues around Huddersfield, including The University of Huddersfield, Lawrence Batley Theatre, Huddersfield Town Hall, The Media Centre, libraries and local bars/cafes.

The Festival provides Access Guides to key venues and includes several subtitled events every year. Many events are free or low cost.

Festival patrons are Lemn Sissay MBE and Sir Patrick Stewart OBE and lisa luxx.

In 2016, 2017 & 2020, the Festival was chosen as a finalist in Welcome to Yorkshire's White Rose Awards. Award wins include Huddersfield Examiner Community Award (Arts category) in May 2017 and Accessible & Inclusive Tourism at the Yorkshire Post Tourism Awards in December 2022.

== History ==
Originally conceived in 2006 the festival is run as a not-for-profit organisation, with funding from the University of Huddersfield and the Arts Council, with business sponsorship from local firms and one-off grants from other sources.

From 2009 to 2011 the festival was headed up by creative writing tutor and author Michael Stewart. In 2012 it took a break, but was relaunched in 2013 with a new Festival Director Michelle Hodgson of Key Words. In April 2013, Michelle featured in The Independent on Sunday's Happy List for her work with the festival.

Over the years, the festival has welcomed a diverse range of authors, poets and performers (see below).

== Notable visiting authors ==
=== 2006 ===
Abdellatif Akbib (Winner of the British Council Literary Prize 2003), Francesca Beard, Martyn Bedford, John Boyne, Donna Daley-Clarke, David Stuart Davies, Gideon Defoe, Jeremy Dyson, Paul Farley, Mark Gatiss, George Green, Sarah Hall, Stephen Hall, Geoff Hattersley, Peter Hobbs, Gaia Holmes, Simon Ings, Helen Ivory, Chris Kerr, Shamshad Khan, Frances Leviston, Mil Millington, Julie Myerson, Patrick Neate, Jacob Polley, Geoff Ryman, Adam Strickson, George Szirtes, Dr Harriet Tarlo, Sophie Wainwright (aka: Sophie Codman), Louise Welsh

=== 2007 ===
Andrew Motion, Joanne Harris, Adam Foulds, Joolz Denby, Simon Trewin, Simon Scarrow, Robert Low, Dorothea Smartt, Gaia Holmes, Shamshad Khan. Lee Hughes, David Wheatley, Rommi Smith, George Green, Michael Stewart, Sol B River.

=== 2008 ===
Ann Cleeves, Duncan Lawrie, Joanne Harris, Doreen Lawrence, Kester Aspden CWO Gold Dagger Winner 2008, Sefi Atta, Janet Fisher, Louise Page, Jim Greenhalf, Nick Toczek and Yunis Alan.

=== 2009 ===
Joanne Harris, Lemn Sissay, Ian McMillan, John Cooper Clarke, Mark E. Smith, Simon Armitage.

=== 2010 ===
Alexei Sayle, A. L. Kennedy, Sara Maitland, Moniza Alvi.

=== 2011 ===
David Peace. Melvin Burgess, David Nobbs, Anne Fine.

=== 2012 ===
Break year, no festival.

=== 2013 ===
Jodi Picoult, Kate Atkinson, Joanne Harris, Jeremy Dyson, Annabel Pitcher, Michael Stewart, Monkey Poet, Andrew Mitchell, Gaia Holmes.

=== 2014 ===
Kate Adie, Annapurna Indian Dance, David Barnett, Paul Burston, Jim Crace, Mari Hannah, Joanne Harris, Gwyneth Hughes, Keith Jarrett, Marina Lewycka, VG Lee, Adam Lowe, Ken MacLeod, Sunny Ormonde, Lemn Sissay and Jah Wobble.

=== 2015 ===
David Barnett, Paul Burston, M. R. Carey, Bettina Carpi, Jamie DeWolf, Rosie Garland, Matt Haig, Joanne Harris, Amanda Huxtable, Christian Jarrett, Helen Lederer, V. G. Lee, Gary Lloyd, Wilf Lunn, Kei Miller, David Nobbs, Diriye Osman, Gerry Potter, Justina Robson, Kadija Sesay, Michael Stewart, Bryan Talbot & Mary M. Talbot.

=== 2016 ===
Asfa-Wossen Asserate, Michael Billington, James Bran, Paul Burston, Rosie Garland, Christopher Fowler, Prof Joanne Fletcher, Kate Fox, Claire Harman, Joanne Harris, Alan Johnson MP Ben Miller, Michael Stewart, Rupert Thomson, Irvine Welsh, Levison Wood

=== 2017 ===
Jake Arnott, James Bran, Paul Burston, Kit De Waal, Kate Fox, Joanne Harris, Alan Johnson MP, Murray Lachlan Young, Owen Lowery, Adrian Lukis, Jenni Murray, Henry Normal, Ian Rankin, Lemn Sissay, Attila the Stockbroker, Julie Summers, Michael Stewart

=== 2018 ===
Diane Allen, Annapurna Indian Dance, Simon Armitage, Paul Burston, Emily Drabble, Joanne Harris, Marty Jopson, Vaseem Khan, Lucy Mangan, David McAlmont, Owen O'Neill, Helen Pankhurst, Annabel Pitcher, Michael Stewart, Sir Patrick Stewart, Jeremy Vine.

=== 2019 ===
Johnny Ball, Paul Burston, Ann Cleeves, Jon Copley, Kit de Waal, Professor Angela Gallop, Joanne Harris, Darren Henley, Alan Johnson, Kate Fox, Lisa Luxx, Owen O'Neill, Nikesh Shukla, Cath Staincliffe, Michael Stewart.

=== 2020 ===
Bernardine Evaristo, Helen Mort, Lemn Sissay (note: events limited due to Covid outbreak)

=== 2021 ===
Paul Burston, AA Dhand, Dark Horse Theatre, Ching He Huang, Alexander McCall Smith, Val McDermid, Kei Miller, Saima Mir, Johny Pitts, Peter Robinson, Monique Roffey

=== 2022 ===
Joan Anim-Addo, Annapurna Indian Dancers, RC Bridgestock, Dr John Cooper Clarke, Professor Angela Gallop, Joanne Harris, Erin Kelly, Deidre Osborne, Pete Paphides, Sharena Lee Satti, Kadija Sesay, Lemn Sissay, Greg Stobbs, Rupert Thomson, Toni Tone.

=== 2023 ===
Patience Agbabi, John Aizlewood, Penny Batchelor, Will Belshah, Chérie Taylor Battiste, Jeffrey Boakye, Paul Burston, Rose Condo, Catherine Curzon, Linda Green, Celia Imrie, Linton Kwesi Johnson, Milly Johnson, Paterson Joseph, Adam Lowe, Omar Lyefook, Stuart Maconie, Helen Mort, Lisa Nandy, Jason Allen Paisant, Nell Pattison, Helen Rook, Sharena Lee Satti, Balbir Singh Dance Company, Attila the Stockbroker, Joelle Taylor, George Webster.

=== 2024 ===
Annapurna Indian Dance, Simon Armitage, Amy-Jane Beer, Ash Bhardwaj, Mark Billingham, Judith Bryan, Paul Burston, Rose Condo, Ben Crystal, David Crystal, Gavin Esler, Colin Grant, Gaia Holmes, Sairish Hussain, Sarah Hussain, Helen Lederer, lisa luxx, Andrew McMillan, Abir Mukherjee, Kate Pankhurst, Kate Rawles, Monique Roffey, Alex Wheatle, Charlotte Williams, Nicola Williams.

=== 2025 ===
David Barnett, Paul Burston, Rose Condo, AA Dhand, Kate Fox, Rosie Garland, Patrick Grant, Philippa Gregory, Joanne Harris, Alan Johnson, Rachel Joyce, Jackie Kay, Lorraine Kelly, Stuart Maconie, Okechukwu Nzelu, Michael Stewart, Russ Thomas

=== 2026 ===
Simon Armitage, Paul Burston, Vince Cable, Horatio Clare, Rose Condo, Brian Groom, Joanne Harris, Claire O'Callaghan, Darren Henley Val McDermid, Chris Mould, Ardal O'Hanlon, Sunny Ormonde, Hardeep Sahota, Lemn Sissay, Michael Stewart
