= Courtyard Theatre, London =

Theatre in Hoxton, London, England

The Courtyard
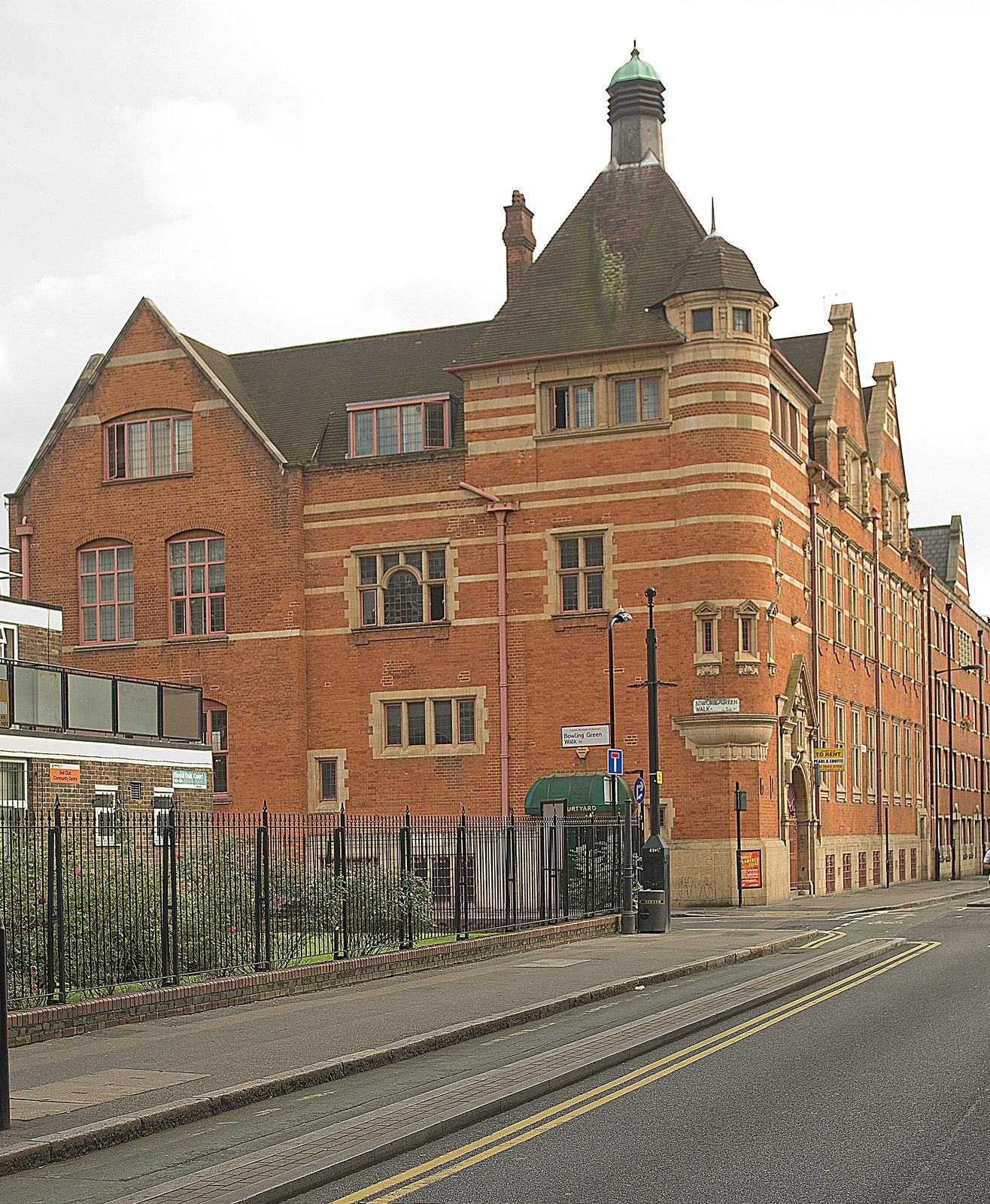
- Interactive map of The Courtyard
- Location: Hoxton; London, N1; United Kingdom
- Coordinates: 51.5279°N 0.0835°W
- Designation: Grade II listed
- Public transit: Old Street

Website
- thecourtyard.org.uk

The Courtyard is a theatre housed in the former public library (originally known as the Passmore Edwards Free Library) in Pitfield Street in Hoxton, London Borough of Hackney, England. It is a Grade II listed building.

The Courtyard operates both a 150-seat main house Theatre and a 216-capacity Live Music Studio. It is also home to the Iambic wine bar.

The Courtyard hosted the first London Horror Festival in October/November 2011, a co-production between The Courtyard and Theatre of the Damned, the UK's first festival of horror in the performing arts.

The Courtyard is located in Hoxton/Shoreditch, which is an area known for its creative industries. It is has hosted as a venue for emerging artists to exhibit their work.

The Courtyard is home to its own theatre company known as Court Theatre Training Company, a drama school that is accredited by Bucks New Uni.

== King's Cross Award ==
The King's Cross Award for New Writing is an award for "imaginative, original work which explores the unique possibilities of writing for the stage", run by the Courtyard Theatre. It was founded in 2003, and the 7th contest was in 2015.

Past winners have included Evan Placey for Mother of Him, Michael Stewart for Karrie Owkie, and Rob Johnson for Tunnel Vision.
