= Scotland on Sunday =

Newspaper

- Type: Sunday newspaper
- Format: Compact
- Owner(s): National World
- Editor: Neil McIntosh
- Founded: 1988
- Political alignment: Centre-right
- Headquarters: Edinburgh, Scotland, UK
- Circulation: 3,996 (as of 2023)
- Sister newspapers: Edinburgh Evening News; The Scotsman
- Website: scotlandonsunday.com

Scotland on Sunday is a Scottish Sunday newspaper, published in Edinburgh by National World and consequently assuming the role of Sunday sister to its daily stablemate The Scotsman. It was originally printed in broadsheet format but in 2013 was relaunched as a tabloid. Since this latest relaunch it comprises three parts, the newspaper itself which includes the original "Insight" section, a sports section and Spectrum magazine which incorporates At Home, originally a separate magazine.

It backed a 'No' vote in the referendum on Scottish independence.

== History ==
Scotland on Sunday was launched on 7 August 1988 and was priced at 40p.

Ultimate ownership of Scotland on Sunday has changed several times since launch. The Scotsman Publications Limited, which also produces The Scotsman, Edinburgh Evening News and the Herald & Post series of free newspapers in Edinburgh, Fife, West Lothian and Perth, was bought by the Canadian millionaire Roy Thomson in 1953.

In 1995, the group was sold to the billionaire Barclay Brothers for £85 million. They moved the group from its landmark Edinburgh office on North Bridge, which is now an upmarket hotel, to new offices in Holyrood Road, near where the Scottish Parliament Building was subsequently built. Then in December 2005 the paper, along with the other Scotsman Publications titles, was sold to Edinburgh-based newspaper group Johnston Press in a £160 million deal. Johnston Press entered administration in November 2018. Its assets were acquired by JPIMedia.

== Former journalists ==
- Brian Groom, author of Northerners and Made in Manchester, is a former editor
- Kenneth Roy was the paper's television critic and sketch writer

== See also ==
- List of newspapers in Scotland
- Iain Gale, Scotland on Sunday art critic
- Andrew Crumey, Scotland on Sunday literary editor, 2000–06
