= Edith Key =

British suffragette

- Edith Key. Photo courtesy of West Yorkshire Archive Service Kirklees, KC1060/2
- Born: 1872; Ecclesfield, England, United Kingdom of Great Britain and Ireland
- Died: 1937 (aged 64–65)
- Occupation: Suffragette
- Spouse: Frederick Key (m. 1891)

Edith Key (1872–1937) was a British suffragette.

== Biography ==
Edith was born in January 1872 in Ecclesfield, Bradford. Her mother was Grace Procter, a mill worker. Her father was most likely Joseph Fawcett, a local mill owner, who signed an 'Agreement to a Child' to pay Grace a weekly allowance until Edith was thirteen years old. Raised by her aunts, Edith moved to Huddersfield some time before her 10th birthday. She worked in a mill from age 10 and left school at age 13.

Edith married Frederick Key, a blind musician, in March 1891. Together they opened a music shop in Huddersfield, which they lived above. Frederick was active in socialist politics, and Edith soon became involved in the women's suffrage movement. She was the secretary-organiser of the Huddersfield branch of the Women's Social and Political Union (WSPU), formed in 1906 at a meeting chaired by Emmeline Pankhurst.

Edith's diligent record-keeping ensured a complete record survives of this period of local suffragist history in the form of her minutes book, deposited in the West Yorkshire Archives Service by Edith's granddaughter. It is one of only three WSPU minute books known to have survived, and the only one outside of a London branch, and provides a valuable insight into how local branches interacted with the WSPU, and of the concerns of WSPU members far removed from the militant actions which mostly took place in London.

She attended several suffrage demonstrations in London, at one being arrested and held in HM Prison Holloway for several days before being released due to lack of evidence. The WSPU minute book includes a copy of a letter sent by Edith on behalf of the branch to "dear friends" in Holloway Gaol, expressing hope from the branch "that your health and strength and womanly endurance may enable you to complete your sentences".

The Key's home above their music shop served as regional headquarters for the Huddersfield WSPU. According to Edith's son Archibald, it also became "unofficial headquarters for the ILP [the Independent Labour Party, of which Frederick was a member] and plotting room for suffragette militancy". From 1913–14, Edith used her home to hide a number of suffragette "mice", women who were evading prison under the Cat and Mouse Act. Among those she offered shelter to was Adela Pankhurst, daughter of Emmeline Pankhurst. Edith died in 1937 aged 65, and was buried in Edgerton Cemetery.

== Legacy ==
Key's name is commemorated in Huddersfield through two organisations: the Edith Key Centre, a base for community and campaigning organisations, opened in 2014; and the Edith Key building at the University of Huddersfield, which houses the Department of Psychology in the School of Human and Health Sciences.
