= George W. Buckley =

British businessman (born 1947)

Sir George W. Buckley
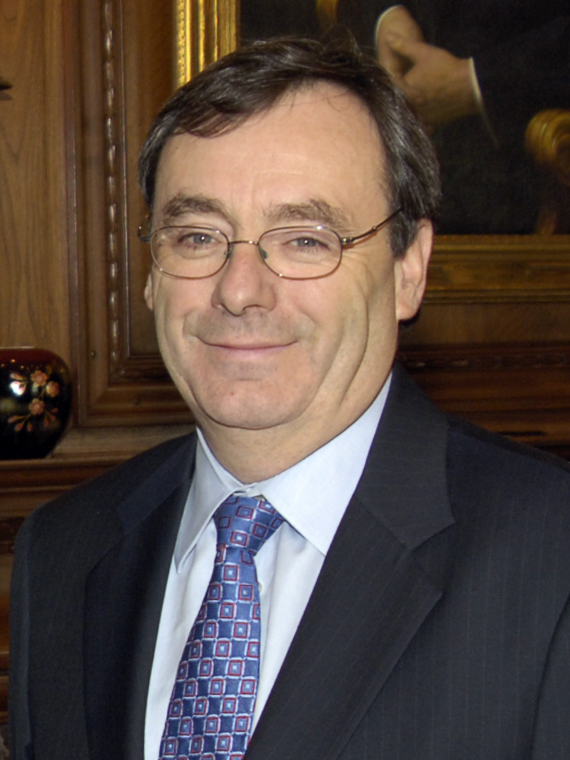
- Buckley in 2006
- Born: George William Buckley; 23 February 1947 (age 79); Sheffield, Yorkshire, England

Sir George William Buckley (born 23 February 1947) is a British businessman. He is the former chairman, president, and chief executive of 3M. He was named to these positions on 7 December 2005. He is the chairman of Ownership Capital B.V., chairman of Arle Capital LLP, chairman of Smiths Group plc, and chairman of Expro International.

== Early life ==
George W. Buckley was born in Sheffield. He was raised by his disabled grandmother in Pitsmoor.

Buckley was apprenticed as an electrician, eventually progressing to a BSc in electrical and electronic engineering at the University of Huddersfield. He also holds a PhD in engineering studied jointly at the University of Huddersfield and the University of Southampton, and an honorary DSc in engineering from the University of Huddersfield.

== Career ==
In a 2009 letter to 3M shareholders, George W. Buckley discussed the actions he had taken in response to the economic climate, including cutting jobs. Buckley remarked that the layoffs that would number "as many as necessary but as few as possible," as well as how 3M "used furloughs, pay cuts, overtime bans, mandatory vacations and stringent incidental cost control to limit the number of layoffs, but in the end some were needed." He reassured shareholders that "In a 5% recession there is still 95% of the business left and winning an increasing share of that business has to be our focus."

While CEO of 3M in 2008, Buckley earned a total remuneration of $12,182,410; which included a base salary of $1,720,000; a cash bonus of $2,844,074; stocks granted of $4,002,421; options granted of $3,363,492; and other additional remuneration of $252,423. In 2009, George Buckley earned a total remuneration of $13,992,628, which included a base salary of $1,720,000, a cash bonus of $3,859,112, stocks granted worth $4,333,655, options granted of $3,757,572, and other additional remuneration of $322,289.

Buckley was knighted in the 2011 Birthday Honours for services to industry. He was elected a Fellow of the Royal Academy of Engineering in 2018.

In 2012, Buckley delivered the keynote address at the 24th annual Ugandan North American Association (UNAA) convention in Philadelphia, Pennsylvania.

In October 2020, Buckley was appointed as Chancellor of the University of Huddersfield, replacing Prince Andrew, Duke of York.
