= Edinburgh Evening News =

Daily newspaper in Edinburgh, Scotland

- Edinburgh Evening News cover (29 March 2016)
- Type: Daily newspaper
- Owner: National World
- Editor: Print Editor Helen Gourlay / Digital Editor Rhoda Morrison
- Founded: 1873
- Headquarters: Edinburgh, Scotland, UK
- Circulation: 5,070 (as of 2024)
- Sister newspapers: Scotland on Sunday; The Scotsman
- Website: edinburghnews.scotsman.com

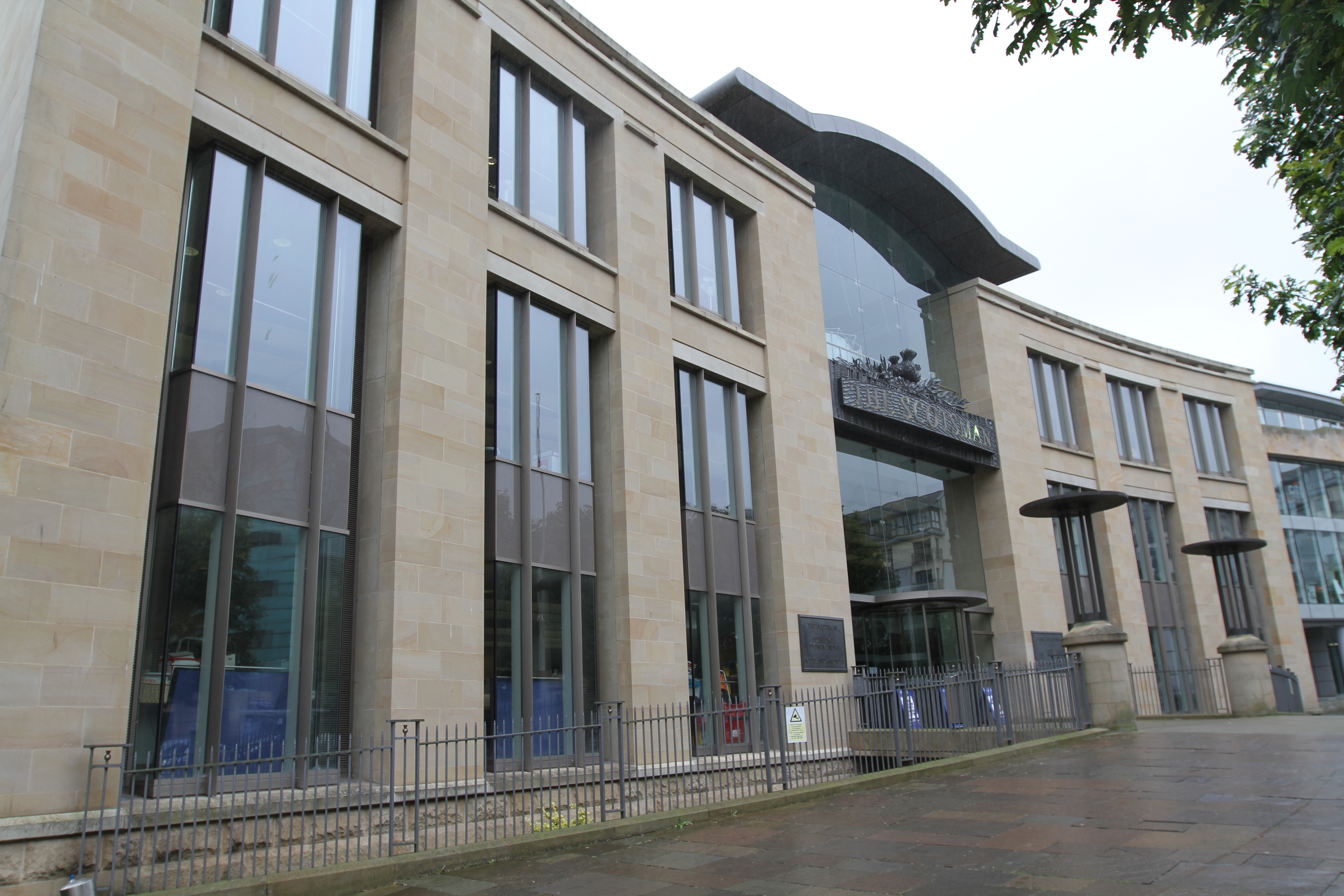
The former offices of The Scotsman, Scotland on Sunday, and the Edinburgh Evening News. The building is on Holyrood Road, Edinburgh.

The Edinburgh Evening News is a daily newspaper and website based in Edinburgh, Scotland. It was founded by John Wilson (1844–1909) and first published in 1873. It is printed daily, except on Sundays. It is owned by National World, which also owns The Scotsman.

Much of the content of the Evening News concerns local issues such as transport, health, the local council and crime in Edinburgh and the Lothians. The paper has a significant number of journalists covering sport, with a dedicated reporter assigned to each of the city's football teams, Heart of Midlothian and Hibernian.

== Circulation ==
According to ABC figures for February 2014, the paper's circulation was 28,000, down from 32,160 in the preceding February. In 2016 this had dropped to 18,362, falling again to 16,660 by February 2018. In 2023, the circulation was 6,226.

In November 2018, the owners of the Edinburgh Evening News holding company The Scotsman Publications, Johnston Press, went into administration. The assets were sold to JPIMedia.

The Evening News competed with the Edinburgh Evening Dispatch until 1963 when it subsumed the rival publication. It is now the second biggest news website in Edinburgh following the launch of the Edinburgh Live website in September 2018.

Alongside its sister publications The Scotsman and Scotland on Sunday, the Edinburgh Evening News was formerly headquartered in the Scottish capital at Barclay House on Holyrood Road (now the main business address of Grand Theft Auto video game makers, Rockstar North). The newspapers vacated the premises in 2014 downsizing to Orchard Brae House on Queensferry Road, in a move which saved Johnston Press (as it then was) approximately one million pounds per year in costs.

== Notable journalists ==
- Ian Swanson, who received a Lifetime Achievement award at the Scottish Press Awards in 2024

== See also ==
- List of newspapers in Scotland
