= Julian Norton =

British veterinary surgeon, author and TV personality

- Born: 3 June 1972 (age 54); Castleford, West Yorkshire, England
- Education: Pembroke College, Cambridge
- Occupations: Veterinary surgeon, TV personality, author
- Spouse: Anne
- Children: Two

Julian Norton (born 3 June 1972) is a British veterinary surgeon, author and TV personality, best known for his appearances on twenty series of The Yorkshire Vet, which has been broadcast on Channel 5 since 2015.

== Early life ==
Norton was born and brought up in the mining town of Castleford and went to school in Wakefield at Queen Elizabeth Grammar School, before gaining a place to study veterinary medicine at Cambridge University.

== Career ==
Norton attained a certificate in Small Animal Practice in 2007. From 2018 he worked at Rae, Bean and Partners in Boroughbridge, North Yorkshire. He moved to a new independent small animal practice – Sandbeck Veterinary Centre – in Wetherby, West Yorkshire in 2019 and, in March 2021, Norton opened the Thirsk Veterinary Centre with colleagues. Norton also co-authored a paper in the Veterinary Record 142: 107–109, on the "Measurement of arterial oxygen-haemaglobin saturation in newborn lambs by pulse oximetry".

He performs regular "in conversation" events with comedian and stand up poet, Kate Fox, and was awarded the Dalesman "Yorkshireman of the Year 2017".

Norton is connected with various charities and is an ambassador for Cheetah Conservation Fund (www.cheetah.org.uk) and for VetMentor, an organisation to assist potential veterinary students. He is also partnered with charity Riding for the Disabled. During his work with the organisation, he raised enough funds for riding lessons for 32 disabled children.

=== Sporting achievements ===
Norton held the world record for 24-hour tandem indoor rowing in 2010 with friend Roger Brown, an ex-Olympic rower.

He has competed in the UK Ironman event, finishing in the top 50 in 2013, and represented Britain at age-group level in the European Long Course Duathlon in 2014 and 2015 and at the European Middle Distance Triathlon championships in 2014 and 2015.

He completed the Patrouille des Glaciers ski mountaineering race from Zermatt to Verbier in 2018.

== Personal life ==
Norton is a mixed practice veterinary surgeon, in North Yorkshire, where he lives with his wife, Anne and two sons, Jack and Archie. He has spent the majority of his working life in Thirsk, working as, first, an assistant, then partner in the practice at which Alf Wight (better known under his pseudonym of James Herriot) had worked.

Norton is an active supporter of the Liberal Democrats.

== Channel 5/Daisybeck programmes ==
From 2015 to 2018, Norton was the main vet featured in the Channel 5 docuseries The Yorkshire Vet. Produced by Daisybeck Studios in Leeds, the show originally featured Norton working as at a vet at Skeldale Veterinary Centre in Thirsk, alongside Peter Wright. The programme became popular, achieving viewing figures of over 2 million and making it one of the channel's most successful shows. Since 2018, the programme has followed Norton as he worked at a number of new veterinary practices and added Donaldson's Vets on Somerset Road in Almondbury as a filming location, following vets David Melleney, Matt Smith and Shona Searson as they go out to see animals in the Huddersfield area and on Cannon Hall Farm.

Norton has also featured as a regular guest on The Wright Stuff as well as Springtime on the Farm and Big Week at the Zoo.

In 2021, season 13 of The Yorkshire Vet followed Norton as he sets up the Sandbeck Veterinary Centre in Wetherby, a surgery which became one of the three places the series is based at, alongside Grace Lane Vets in Kirkbymoorside and Donaldson's Vets in Almondbury, Huddersfield.

In 2022, Norton presented reports for the Channel 5 documentary series Our Great Yorkshire Life, visiting Becky and Ian Sheveling's vineyard in Robin Hood's Bay for the first episode. Our Great Yorkshire Life also features Norton's co-stars from The Yorkshire Vet (Peter Wright) and This Week on the Farm (Cannon Hall Farm brothers Dave and Rob Nicholson) as presenters and is narrated by Emmerdale actor Dean Andrews.

== Works ==
=== Filmography ===
Television

Year	Title	Role	Channel
2015—	The Yorkshire Vet	Himself	Channel 5
2017	The Wright Stuff	Himself – Special Guest	Channel 5
2018	Springtime on the Farm	Himself	Channel 5
2018	Big Week at the Zoo	Presenter	Channel 5
2020	This Week on the Farm	Himself	Channel 5
2021	Live: Summer on the Farm	Himself	Channel 5
2022	Our Great Yorkshire Life	Presenter	Channel 5

=== Books ===
Norton has written six books, and he also contributes a weekly column in The Country Week of The Yorkshire Post.

- Horses, Heifers and Hairy Pigs: The Life of a Yorkshire Vet. Michael O'Mara. 2016. ISBN 978-1782436836.
- A Yorkshire Vet Through the Seasons. Michael O'Mara. 2017. ISBN 978-1782438434.
- The Diary of a Yorkshire Vet. Great Northern Books Ltd. 2018. ISBN 978-1912101801.
- On Call with a Yorkshire Vet. Great Northern Books, 2019. ISBN 978-1912101207
- A Yorkshire Vet: The Next Chapter. Hodder and Stoughton, 2020.ISBN 978-1529378337
- All Creatures: Heart-warming Tales from a Yorkshire Vet. Hodder and Stoughton, 2021. ISBN 978-1529378399
