= Michael Stewart (British writer, born 1971) =

English writer and academic (born 1971)

Michael Stewart (born 1971) is an English novelist, short story writer, poet, and playwright. Born and brought up in Salford, he now lives in Bradford. He is currently course leader in Creative Writing at Huddersfield University, editorial manager of Grist Books which he founded, and co-director of the Brontë Centre for Writing and Research in Haworth. He was director of the Huddersfield Literature Festival from 2008 to 2012.

== Early life and education ==
Stewart was born in Salford and attended "a failing comprehensive that also 'educated' most of the Happy Mondays", which was demolished soon after he left it. He started work, aged 16, in a factory in Newton Heath, and borrowed books from his local public library to read on his bus journey to and from there. He read Wuthering Heights, having earlier seen the 1939 film, and writes: "Slowly the story and characters drew me in. Somehow they took hold of me and wouldn't let go." He moved to Yorkshire in 1995. He has a PhD from the University of Huddersfield (2015), his doctoral thesis being "Rebooting the lyrical story : structure, viewpoint and aspects of realism in short fiction".

== Career ==
In October 2011, Stewart's debut novel, King Crow (2011) was awarded the Not the Booker Prize by The Guardian newspaper and described as a 'literary sensation'. It follows teenager Paul Cooper's obsession with birds. To escape a troubled home life, Paul compares the people he knows with different species of birds, but he embarks upon a chaotic journey of self-discovery when he befriends a dangerous raven named Ashley. King Crow was selected as a recommended read for World Book Night in April 2012.

Stewart's first short story collection, Mr Jolly, (Valley Press), was published in 2016. Rupert Dastur praised the collection's "cheeky intellectualism, raves and rants, quiet solitude, and humour" and noted that its "major accomplishments involve the extraordinary spread of topics, styles, and characters".

Stewart has won several awards for his scriptwriting, including the BBC Alfred Bradley Bursary Award and the King's Cross Award for New Writing. His short fiction has been published in Tears in the Fence, Brand, Riptide, The Reader, and many other places.

Stewart is also the creator of The Brontë Stones project, four monumental stones situated in the landscape between the Brontë birthplace in Thornton and the Brontë Parsonage Museum in Haworth, inscribed with specially commissioned poems written by Kate Bush, Carol Ann Duffy, Jeanette Winterson, and Jackie Kay. The project was supported by the Bradford Literature Festival and funded by the Arts Council England. The stones are accompanied by four walking trails devised by Stewart in and across the landscape between Thornton and Haworth. They are accompanied by specially commissioned maps, designed and drawn by cartographer, Chris Goddard.

The Brontë Stones is part of Stewart's wider portfolio of literary and cultural projects connected to the Brontës. His novel, Ill Will (2018), published by HarperCollins, responds to Emily Brontë's Wuthering Heights , telling the story of Heathcliff's missing years. His hybrid memoir, Walking the Invisible: Following in the Brontës' Footsteps (2021), follows the Brontës across Northern England and investigates the geographical and social features that shaped their work. It was praised in The Guardian as 'a terrific tribute to the Brontës – and to the landscape that shaped their literature', demonstrating 'how landscape grows in the imagination and lays bare the "invisible" world of the heart and mind'. The chapter on Anne Brontë's last three days in Scarborough was published separately in a limited edition with the title Boiled Milk. In 2020, Stewart was instrumental in obtaining and installing the blue heritage plaque now visible at the Brontë Birthplace in Thornton, which was commissioned by the then owners in association with Bradford Civic Society, along with financial support from locally based supermarket chain Morrisons. The blue plaque was part of Stewart's efforts to bring the Brontë birthplace 'to people's attention and connect it to Haworth'.

Stewart's 2023 poetry collection, The Dogs, was published by Smokestack Books. It touches upon the origin myths of dogs, how they have been viewed by different societies through the centuries and how man co-opted dogs into everyday life. It also looks at the effects of genetic changes on dogs through breeding and imagines a future world where dogs have learned to speak and are demanding better treatment from humans. The Dogs includes illustrations by artist Louis Benoit. The Dogs became an exhibition at Artworks, The Everybody Gallery, Halifax, in the summer of 2023. The exhibition also included sculptures by Moira Benoit and a 3D Soundscape by musicians, Dr Hyunkook Lee and Katia Sochaczewska.

Stewart's television contributions include Britain's Novel Landscapes for Channel 4, Our Great Yorkshire Life for Channel 5, BBC Breakfast, and Countryfile on BBC One.

== Selected publications ==
=== Novels ===
- King Crow (2011) ISBN 9780956687616
- Café Assassin (2015) ISBN 9781910422052
- Ill Will: The Untold Story of Heathcliff (2018) ISBN 9780008248154
- Black Wood Women (21 November 2024) ISBN 9780008696306

=== Short fiction collections ===
- Mr Jolly (2016) ISBN 9781908853608
- Four Letter Words (2022) ISBN 9781903110898

=== Poetry collections ===
- Couples (2013) ISBN 9781912436408
- The Dogs (2023) ISBN 9781739173029

=== Radio drama ===
- Connor's Song (BBC Radio 4, Afternoon Drama, 2017)
- Dead Man's Suit (BBC Radio 4, Afternoon Drama, 2013)
- Castaway (BBC Radio 4, Afternoon Drama, 2012)
- Excluded (BBC, Radio 4, Afternoon Drama, 2007)

=== Theatre ===
- 2013 Singing The Blues, premièred at Crucible Theatre, Sheffield
- 2011 The Shadow of Your Hand, premièred at 24:7 Festival, Sachas, Manchester
- 2009 Mr Jolly premièred at The Old Red Lion Theatre, Islington as part of The Off Cut Festival
- 2008 Brood premièred, The Albany, London
- 2007–2008 Karry Owky (produced by) Vista Theatre Company, toured: Studio Salford (Salford), Love Apple (Bradford) and CragRats Mill (Holmfirth), Library Theatre (Manchester)
- 2007 Commissioned by Chol Theatre to write The Oceans of Europa for their Space Circus project. The piece toured 115 institutions and was shortlisted for the Brian Way Award (2009)
- 2007 Meat Space premiered Fleshpot Theatre, Devonshire Arms, Kensington
- 2006 Dark and Dirty cabaret premièred, Theatre in the Mill, Bradford
- 2005 The Cleaners, premièred, Theatre in the Mill, Bradford, as part of the BBC Northern Exposure Festival
- 2004 The Cabinet of Terrible Terrors premièred LBT, Huddersfield.
- 2002 The Art of War, Edinburgh Fringe Festival, Edinburgh
- 2002 Statements A and B and May Day performed as a double bill at Lion and Unicorn Theatre, Kentish Town, London
- 2002 Bambiha, performed at Jackson’s Lane Theatre in London. Headlined a festival of New Writing March 2002
- 1999 May Day, premiered Bradford Playhouse (subsequent performances in HMP Leeds).
- 1999 Locked In, premièred Raven Theatre in Leeds (subsequent performances in HM Prison Leeds).

=== Non-fiction ===
- Walking the Invisible (2018) ISBN 9780008430184

=== As editor ===
- Apocalypse Now? Stories for the End of the World (2024) ISBN 9780956309976
- We're All In It Together: Poems for the Disunited Kingdom (2022), Grist Books ISBN 9780956309969
- Outside the Asylum, Grist Books ISBN 9780956309914
- The Intelligent Woman's Guide, PDG Books ISBN 9781905519040
- The Grist Anthology of New Writing, Grist Books ISBN 9780956309907
- A Complicated Way of Being Ignored, Grist Books ISBN 9780956309921

=== Short fiction ===
- "As Many Grains of Sand" (published in ebook format by Galley Beggar Press)
- "Story Without Meaning" (published in ebook format by Galley Beggar Press)
- "The Blue and the Dim and the Dark Cloths" (published in ebook format by Galley Beggar Press)
- "Mr Jolly" (commissioned by The Reader Magazine, 50th Celebration Issue) ISBN 9780956786296
- "The Man In The White Coat" (Riptide Journal volume 8) ISBN 9780955832666
- "This Is Where You Get Off" (commissioned by Iota magazine, issue 91) ISSN to be confirmed
- "Story Without Meaning" (Biscuit Short Story Prize 2010), Biscuit Anthology ISBN 978-1-903914-44-1
- "Monkeys", Brand literary Magazine issue 4 ISSN 1754-0593
- "The Phone Call", The Aesthetica Creative Works Annual 2009 ISSN 1758-9932
- "You Are Going Back", Tears in the Fence issue 48 ISSN 0266-5816
- "Third Person", The Light That Remains and other stories (Leaf Books) ISBN 9781905599349
- "The Bald Men", Tears in the Fence issue 49 ISSN 0266-5816
- "A Better Devil", Brand literary Magazine issue 1 ISSN 1754-0593
- "A Dog in a Bag", Naked City (Route Books) ISBN 978-1901927238
- ‘He Was Going Out’, The Intelligent Woman’s Guide (PDG Books) ISBN 9781905519040

== Screen Work ==
Stewart has also written for screen. His credits include Just a job and A Black Sheep in the White Swan for Voltage Film (2022), A Few Circles in the Waters for ChalkManVideo (2012), The Reading Room for Screen Yorkshire (2006), and Emmerdale for Yorkshire Television (2003–2004).

== Awards ==
- Not the Booker Prize by The Guardian (2011)
- King's Cross Award for New Writing
- BBC Short Range Competition (2002)
- BBC Alfred Bradley Award (2003)
