= MIAMI Facilities =

English research laboratory

Coordinates: 53.64318°N 1.77959°W

Tungsten sample being irradiated with 60 keV He ions at 500°C using the MIAMI-1 system

The MIAMI facility (acronym for Microscopes and Ion Accelerators for Materials Investigation) is a scientific laboratory located within the Ion Beam Centre at the University of Huddersfield. This facility is dedicated to the study of the interaction of ion beams with matter. The facilities combine ion accelerators in situ with Transmission Electron Microscopes (TEM): a technique that allows real-time monitoring of the effects of radiation damage on the microstructures of a wide variety of materials. Currently the laboratory operates two such systems MIAMI-1 and MIAMI-2 that are the only facilities of this type in the United Kingdom, with only a few other such systems in the world. The MIAMI facility is also part of the UKNIBC (UK National Ion Beam Centre) along with the Universities of Surrey and Manchester, which provides a single point of access to a wide range of accelerators and techniques.

== MIAMI-1 ==
MIAMI-1 consists of a JEOL 2000FX TEM combined with a 10 keV Colutron ion source that can be post accelerated up to a 100 keV. This system was initially constructed at the University of Salford in 2008 and moved to the University of Huddersfield in 2011. It is capable of irradiating materials with Inert gas atoms within the energy range of 2-100 keV, enabling the observation at the nanoscale of displacing irradiation. In particular it has been used to observe effects such as: large sputtering yields of gold nanoparticles that have been irradiated with Xe ions; kink band formation in graphite under heavy ion irradiation; and the observation of ordered arrays of helium nanobubbles in tungsten.

== MIAMI-2 ==
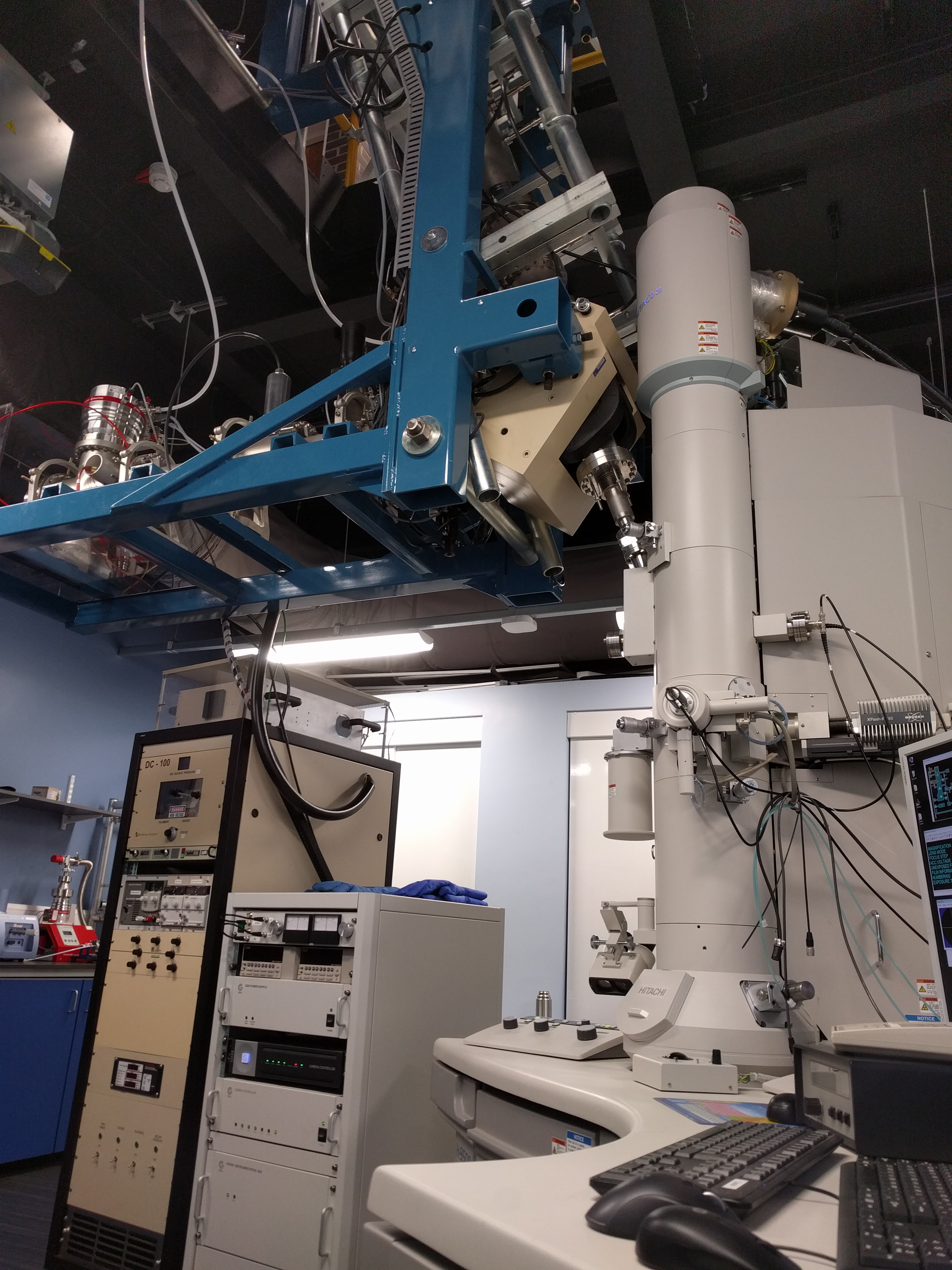
An image of the MIAMI-2 system, showing the TEM and low energy beamline, with the medium energy beamline coming down from the floor above.

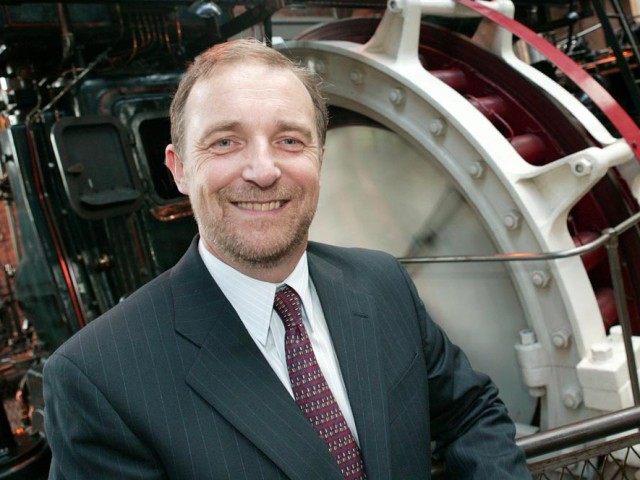
Stephen E. Donnelly

Recently built within the MIAMI facility is the new MIAMI-2 system, this was funded by an EPSRC grant that was awarded in 2015 and was officially opened on 16 March 2018 by Sir Patrick Stewart and Professor Stephen E. Donnelly (the Facility Director at the time). MIAMI-2 consists of two ion beam systems: a 10-350 kV medium-energy beamline (National Electrostatic Corp.) capable of running most ions up to Pb, at energies up to 1 MeV (when using triple-charged ions); and a 1-15 keV low energy beam for light ions (H,He). These are coupled with a 300 kV H-9500 Hitachi TEM, that is equipped with EELS and EDS for elemental and chemical analysis and a gas injection system to allow for the ion irradiation of materials under non-ambient conditions (> 1 Pa). The primary application of the dual ion beam capability of the MIAMI-2 system is to study the synergistic effects of large amounts of damage from the heavy ion and the injection of He or H gas (to represent transmutation gas build up) as to better replicate the effects of neutron irradiation. One of the initial studies on the MIAMI-2 system has shown that tungsten (the material for choice in the divertor armour in the ITER and DEMO Fusion reactors) suffers a buildup of a higher number of immobile defects which inevitably cause increased embrittlement when irradiated under dual heavy and light ion irradiation as compared with light ion irradiation alone.
