= Paul Burston =

Welsh journalist and writer

Paul Burston Hon. FRSL
- Born: York, North Riding of Yorkshire, United Kingdom
- Occupations: Writer and journalist
- Known for: Polari salon, Polari Prize
- Website: www.paulburston.net

Paul Burston is a Welsh journalist and author. He worked for the London gay policing group GALOP and was an activist with ACT UP before moving into journalism. He edited, for some years, the LGBT section of Time Out and founded the Polari Prize.

== Biography ==
Born in York and raised in South Wales, Burston attended Brynteg School and studied English, Drama and Film Studies at university. He worked for the London gay policing group GALOP and was an activist with ACT UP before moving into journalism. He edited, for some years, the gay and lesbian (later LGBT) section of Time Out magazine and was a founding editor of Attitude magazine. He has also written for publications including The Guardian, The Independent, The Times and The Sunday Times.

His first novel Shameless, published in 2001, was praised by The New York Times and shortlisted for the State of Britain Award. His third novel Lovers & Losers, published in 2007, was shortlisted for a Stonewall Award.

In 2007, Burston became the founder and host of award-winning LGBT literary salon Polari, which began in a bar in Soho before moving to the Southbank Centre. He was also the founder, in 2011, of The Polari Book Prize for new and established LGBTQ+ writing, which is now based at the British Library. In 2016, he was featured in the British Council's Five Films 4 Freedom Global List of 33 "inspiring people who use culture to promote freedom and equality and provoke debate, or who are risking their lives to promote the rights of LGBT communities".

Burston's novel The Black Path was published by Accent Press in September 2016 and was long-listed for The Guardian's "Not The Booker Prize".

By October 2018, five novels and two short story collections by Burston had been published. In that month, The Bookseller reported that his sixth novel The Closer I Get was published by Orenda Books as part of a two-book deal. The Closer I Get, published in July 2019, was partly inspired by the author's experience of online harassment.

In December 2021, The Bookseller announced that his memoir We Can Be Heroes would be published by Amazon imprint Little A in June 2023.

With New Yorker Michael-Anthony Nozzi and 1970s alternative drag performer Lavinia Co-op, Burston was interviewed by Alexis Gregory for his 2018 verbatim theatre work Riot Act.

In 2026, Burston was elected an Honorary Fellow of the Royal Society of Literature.

== Bibliography ==
=== Non fiction ===
- A Queer Romance: Lesbians, Gay Men and Popular Culture, Routledge, 1995. ISBN 0-415-09618-9
- What are you Looking at? Queer Sex, Style and Cinema, Continuum International Publishing, 1995. ISBN 0-304-34300-5
- 'Confessions of A Gay Film Critic' in Anti-Gay Freedom Editions, 1996 (ed. Mark Simpson)
- Gutterheart: Life According to Marc Almond, 1981–1996, Dunce Directive, 1997, ISBN 0-9522068-6-2
- Queens' Country, A Tour Around the Gay Ghettos, Queer Spots and Camp Sights of Britain, Little Brown, 1998. ISBN 0-349-11178-2

=== Fiction ===
- Shameless, Abacus, 2001, ISBN 978-0-349-11479-8
- Star People, Little, Brown, 2006, ISBN 978-0-7515-3849-6
- Lovers and Losers, Sphere, 2007, ISBN 978-0-7515-3864-9
- The Gay Divorcee Sphere, 2009, ISBN 978-1-84744-208-6
- The Black Path Accent Press, 2016, ISBN 9781786150455
- The Closer I Get Orenda Books, 2019, ISBN 978-1912374779

=== Edited works ===
- Boys & Girls Glasshouse Books, 2010, ISBN 978-1-907536-09-0
- Men & Women Glasshouse Books, 2011, ISBN 978-1-907536-11-3
