= Kate Fox (writer) =

British poet, author and comedian

Kathryn Fox
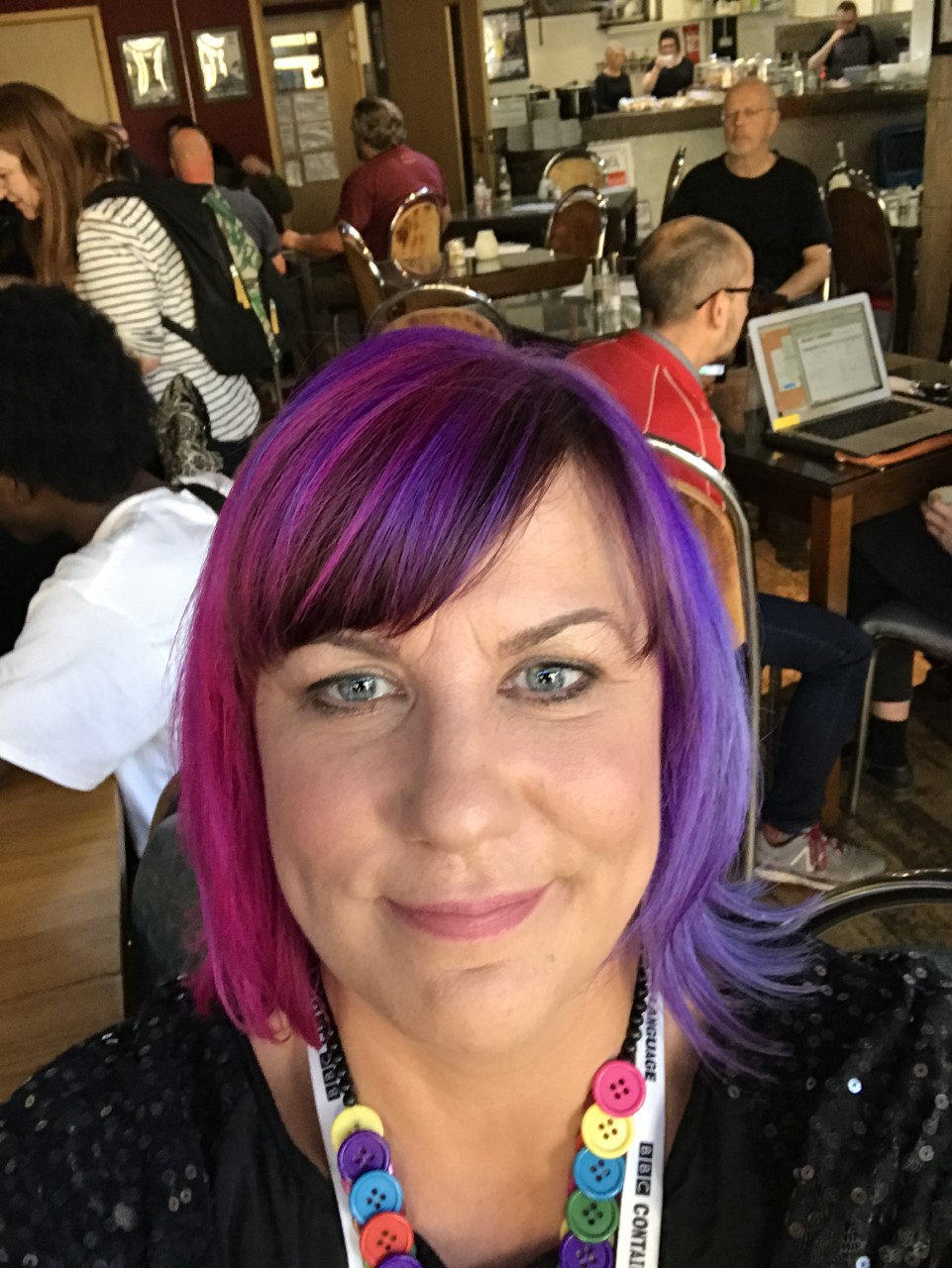
- Born: 31 May 1975 (age 51); Bradford, Yorkshire, England
- Occupations: Writer, poet, comedian

Academic background
- Education: Loughborough University; University of Leeds (PhD)
- Thesis: Resistance in solo stand-up performance by Northern English women marginalised on the basis of gender, class and regional identity (2018)

Academic work
- Discipline: class, gender, comedy, identity
- Notable works: How stand-ups construct and are constructed by the "Northernness Effect"; Confetti and red squirrels: a stand-up autoethnography as an archive of detritus,
- Website: katefox.co.uk

Kate Fox is a British poet, author and comedian, who lives in North Yorkshire. Her poetry residencies have included: Saturday Live on BBC Radio 4 from 2007–14, the Yorkshire Festival, 2014, the Glastonbury Festival 2013 and the Great North Run, 2011. She also writes topical and personal pieces for Standard Issue magazine and The Journal newspaper. Fox has performed her poetry on BBC One and BBC Two, as well as on numerous radio shows. She has supported acts including Linton Kwesi Johnson, Hollie McNish, John Cooper Clarke and John Hegley and is a headline act in her own right.

== Early life ==
Kathryn Elizabeth Fox was born in Bradford, West Yorkshire in 1975 and grew up in Yorkshire and Cumbria. She attended Queensbury School in Bradford, then studied for a BSc in Communication and Media Studies at Loughborough University and graduated in 1996.

== Career ==
Fox originally trained as a radio journalist at Trinity and Leeds Trinity University in Leeds and worked as a reporter, bulletin reader and desk editor at commercial stations including Metro Radio and Galaxy Radio in Newcastle and Manchester until 2005.

She then began working full-time as a poet and workshop facilitator in the North East of England. One of her first workshops included the then newly divorced comedian Sarah Millican, who Kate encouraged to pursue a career in stand-up.

She has published several books of poetry including Chronotopia from Burning Eye Books (2017), Fox Populi from Smokestack Books (2013), We Are Not Stone from Ek Zuban Press (2006) and Why I from Zebra Publishing (2005).

Fox has written and performed several live literature and comedy shows including Where There’s Muck There’s Bras, commissioned by the Great Exhibition of the North (2018), two series of The Price of Happiness for BBC Radio 4 (2017 and 2015), Queens of the North, commissioned by BBC's Contains Strong Language Festival in Hull 2017 (2017), The Starting Line, commissioned by Great North Run Culture (2012) and Kate Fox News, produced by New Writing North and Arc, Stockton (2010)

She has been Poet in Residence for several organisations and events including the Yorkshire Festival (2014), Glastonbury Festival (2013), Great North Run (2011) and Saturday Live on Radio 4 (2007-2014).

She is a regular guest on BBC Radio 3's The Verb and has presented BBC Radio 4's Pick of the Week. Other media appearances include commissioned poems for BBC Two's Daily Politics Show (2007), the Great North Run coverage (2011 and 2013), BBC One's Great North Passion (2014) and BBC Radio 4 Front Row's 20th-anniversary programme (2018). She featured in a BBC Two documentary about the Great Exhibition of the North (2018).

In 2014, she took up a full-time PhD studentship at the University of Leeds looking at class, gender, "Northernness" and stand-up performance and successfully defended her thesis in 2018. Her concept of "Humitas" in which humour and seriousness are enacted in the same frame at the same time, has been cited as important to the field of Comedy Studies.

Fox regularly hosts events, including Northern Stage's season launches, An Evening With Sarah Millican (2017) and An Audience with Julian Norton (2018), as well as An Audience with Jo Brand (Manchester Literature Festival, 2018).

She has performed shows with musicians Union Jill, Simma and the musicians of the All Along the Wall project, including an appearance at the Celtic Connections festival (2010).

She is a Cultural Ambassador for the National Autistic Society. Her work often pays attention to "Northernness", gender, class, place and neurodiversity.

She has promoted live literature events including New Word Order (2004–06), Hyperlexic (2007), Bloomin Words (2012–18) and Ey Up Stand Up (2015–17). She has run poetry projects and workshops for organisations including First Story, Creative Partnerships, the Arvon Foundation and New Writing North.

== Publications ==
=== Poetry ===
- Why I (2005), Zebra Publishing. ISBN 978-0954856427.
- We Are Not Stone (2006), Ek Zuban Press. ISBN 978-0955393013.
- Fox Populi (2013), Smokestack Books. ISBN 978-0957172258.
- Chronotopia (2017), Burning Eye Books. ISBN 978-1911570097.
- The Oscillations (2021), Nine Arches Press. ISBN 978-1913437077.

=== Academic ===
- Stand Up and Be (En) Countered: Resistance in solo stand-up performance by Northern English women marginalised on the basis of gender, class and regional identity. University of Leeds, 2018.

== Awards ==
- Andrew Waterhouse Award from New Writing North (2006)
- K Blundell Trust Award from the Society of Authors (2012)
