= Brian Groom =

British writer

Brian Groom (born 1955) is a journalist and writer born in Stretford and best known for his books Northerners: A History, Made in Manchester and These Isles.

== Life and career ==
After starting as a sports editor in Yorkshire, he spent most of his journalism career at the Financial Times, where he did many of the senior jobs, including political editor, and became an assistant editor. He is a former editor of Scotland on Sunday. He is known as a specialist in British regional and national affairs. He now lives in Saddleworth.

== Books ==
- Northerners: A History, from the Ice Age to the Present Day (HarperNorth, 2022) is a bestselling history of the North of England as told through the lives of its inhabitants. In a sweeping narrative from the earliest times to the present day, it shows how the north's people have shaped Britain and the world in unexpected ways.
- Made in Manchester: A People’s History of the City that Shaped the Modern World (HarperNorth, 2024) tells the story of a Roman settlement that grew to be the 'shock city' of the Industrial Revolution, and has given the world titans of industry, politics, comedy, music and sport.
- These Isles: A People’s History of England, Ireland, Scotland and Wales (HarperNorth, 2026) records the entwined histories of Britain and Ireland and the people who have called these isles home, with forays into popular culture, sport, music, language, literature and art.
