= University of Huddersfield =

University in Kirklees, West Yorkshire, England

Coordinates: 53.64324°N 1.77837°W

- Motto: Latin: Sic Vos Non Vobis
- Motto in English: Thus not for you alone
- Type: Public
- Established: 1825 – Huddersfield Science and Mechanics' Institute; 1992 – university status
- Academic affiliations: Association of Commonwealth Universities; Universities UK; Defence Universities Alliance
- Endowment: £2.71 million (2022)
- Budget: £181.3 million (2021-22)
- Chancellor: George W. Buckley
- Vice-Chancellor: Bob Cryan
- Administrative staff: 1,100 academic, 900 support
- Students: 16,360 (2024/25)
- Undergraduates: 12,865 (2024/25)
- Postgraduates: 3,495 (2024/25)
- Location: Huddersfield, West Yorkshire, England
- Campus: Semi-urban
- Colours: Blue
- Website: hud.ac.uk

The University of Huddersfield is a public research university located in Huddersfield, West Yorkshire, England. It has been a University since 1992, but has its origins in a series of institutions dating back to the 19th century. It has made teaching quality a particular focus of its activities, winning the inaugural Higher Education Academy Global Teaching Excellence Award in 2017, and achieving a Teaching Excellence Framework (TEF) Gold Award, in 2017 and 2023. The university has also put an increasing focus on research quality, and as of 2022 more than three quarters of its academic staff hold a doctorate, the third highest rate in England.

Its chancellor George W. Buckley, a graduate of the university and a former CEO of 3M, was appointed in 2020.

== History ==
The present University of Huddersfield can trace its history back through several predecessor institutions.

=== An early failed start (1825) ===
In 1825 there was an attempt to set up a Scientific and Mechanics Institution in the town. Supported by a group of donors, its patron was leading Whig and large local landowner Sir John Ramsden. Its aims were to instruct local mechanics and tradesmen in scientific principles relating to their work, through lectures and a circulation library, which by 1827 contained over 700 volumes. The financial crisis of 1825–1826 led to the failure of the institution’s bankers, and it faltered and later became part of the Huddersfield Philosophical Society, an organisation with which its rules now more closely aligned. Some 19th-century students earned qualifications as external students of the University of London.

=== Young Men's Mental Improvement Society (1841–1843) ===
The history of the university is usually traced to 1841. It was in that year that five young men who were employed by local industrialist Frederic Schwann, who had been born in Frankfurt, approached their employer for support in establishing a new subscription library and some elementary educational classes, ‘to supply in some cases the deficiency of early instruction, and to procure for others the means of further improvement’. They first met in the Temperance Hotel, Cross Church Street, Huddersfield in May 1841. Classes began for the first 40 or so pupils in the room of the British School at Outcote Bank, and were taught by experienced staff from the local Collegiate Schools and businessmen like Schwann. A subscription library was founded, and classes were delivered in Reading, writing, arithmetic, grammar, geography, design and French.

=== Huddersfield Mechanics' Institution (1844–1883) ===
The increase in student numbers prompted a move to Nelson's Buildings in New Street, and the renaming of the institution to more closely reflect its remit. The first Secretary, Robert Neil, was appointed in 1844, and acted not just as a Secretary but as a teacher-supervisor, influencing the formative development of the organisation. In March 1844 he organised a Soiree (tea party) for 700 at the town's Philosophical Hall, and in May a Rural Gala for 500 at Fixby Pastures. Negotiations with the local railway company led to reduced fares into York for 300 membership to enjoy the cultural opportunities of the city. In 1846, Neil was succeeded by George Searle Phillips, who was described by historian John O'Connell as 'philosopher, propagandist and missionary' of the institution. He oversaw expansion of the curriculum, revision of the fee system to make the institution self-supporting, the visitation of absent students and the compilation of statistics of the institution's achievements.

In 1850, growing attendance meant another move, to Wellington Buildings, Queen Street. At this time, a 'Preliminary Savings Bank' scheme was also introduced in the Institution, linked to the Huddersfield Banking Company, which took almost 7000 deposits during its first year of operation. Based on the Scottish system of encouraging working people to make small, regular saving deposits, it was a forerunner of the Post Office Savings Bank, founded in 1861. In 1854, after Phillips resignation, Frank Curzon took over as Secretary and remained in post until 1883. During his tenure a prize giving and distribution ceremony was introduced to reward attendance and good conduct. He not only oversaw a recruitment drive, but also the move to the first purpose built home of the institution, on Northumberland Street. The institution took possession in 1861, as student numbers passed 800 annually.

The continued prosperity of the institution during the 1860s has been attributed to two main developments – the demand for more technical and scientific education, and the introduction of an examination system by the newly formed national Department of Science and Art. The institution managed an examinations system and gave grants to science schools (often based in Mechanics' Institutions) on a 'payment by results' basis. In 1857 the Society of Arts held its first examinations outside London at Huddersfield.

=== Technical School and Mechanics' Institute (1883–1896) ===
A merger took place with the town’s Female Educational Institute in 1883, and the institution become the Technical School and Mechanics' Institute. A new building was constructed on what it today the ring road called Queensgate that cost £20,000, and was funded by the subscriptions of members and philanthropic supporters. Called the Ramsden Building, after the Ramsden family who owned the land upon which the building stood, the building is still in use by the Health and Human Sciences Department of the university today. Before the building opened to students in 1884, it was used for a five-month Fine Art and Industrial Exhibition. These kinds of exhibitions, inspired by the Great Exhibition, showcased the latest in textile technology alongside copies of great masters paintings or more contemporary works.

=== Technical College and College of Technology (1896–1970) ===
In 1896, the Technical School and Mechanics' Institute became the Technical College, which changed its name in 1958 to become the College of Technology.

World War I was a time of growth for the College. A Coal Tar Chemistry Department was created, funded by the government and by donations which were also used to provide research scholarships in Chemistry. More than 100 chemists worked at the College as research staff as products were created for British Dyes Ltd.

During World War II, the College housed student teachers evacuated from Avery Hill College of Education, Eltham, London (now part of the University of Greenwich), and trained members of the armed forces training to be radio mechanics, engineers, fitters and clerks. Civilians also trained at the College in more basic workshop skills. Music could also be studied at the College. Winifred Smith was appointed organist and music lecturer in 1955. Composer Harold Truscott was there at much the same time.

One notable visitor to the college in 1964 was Dusty Springfield, who appeared at 'Sound Sixty-Four', an event organised by the Huddersfield Tech students as part of Rag Week.

=== Huddersfield Polytechnic (1970–1992) ===
It was the College of Technology which, in 1970, merged with the Oastler College of Education to become Huddersfield Polytechnic. The Oastler College had been founded in 1963, as a day training college for school teachers. Huddersfield Polytechnic was officially inaugurated by the then Education Secretary Margaret Thatcher on 23 April 1971.

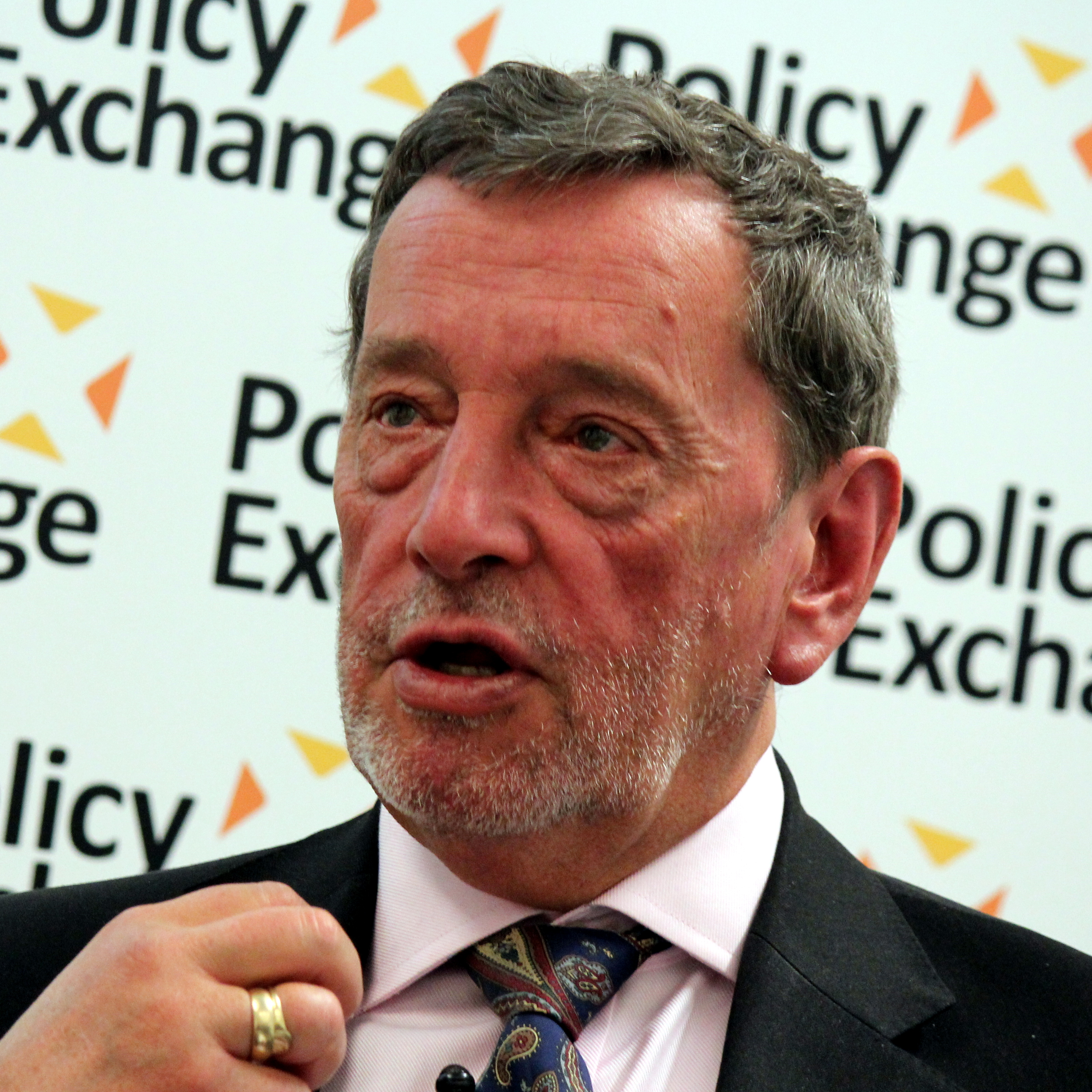
David Blunkett studied at Holly Bank College

In 1974, a further merger took place with the Technical Teaching Training College at Holly Bank. That college had been noted in education circles for its policy of training students over the age of 25, one of whom was the future Education Secretary David Blunkett. However, after the merger, it became part of the Polytechnic's Faculty of Education, and those idiosyncrasies were gradually eroded. Teacher training remained on the Holly Bank site until the land was sold by the university in 2001.

The campus precinct was redeveloped by the firm Wilson and Womersley. Awarding J. L. Womersley a Fellowship for the design, the Deputy Rector commented on the courage and vision of the plan, with the Central Services building in particular being a monument to that vision. The large brown Central Services Building, now known as the Schwann Building, a prominent feature not just of the campus but also the town of Huddersfield itself, was completed in January 1977. The brown colour was chosen so it would better fit in with the local sandstone. The building was officially opened by the Duchess of Kent.

Several high-profile bands played the university's students' union during the late 1970s and early 1980s, including The Stranglers, The Jam and The Undertones.

Former Prime Minister Harold Wilson returned to his hometown in 1983, the same year he stood down as an MP, to open a university building on Firth Street and to deliver a lecture. He would later have a different building named after him on the campus. An annual memorial lecture takes place at the university in his name, and notable speakers have included former Prime Ministers Gordon Brown in 2018 and Sir John Major in 2022.

=== University of Huddersfield (since 1992) ===
The Polytechnic became the University of Huddersfield in 1992.

Professor Ken Durrands was Vice-Chancellor at the time the institution achieved university status. He was later credited with having "transformed" it into "a thriving university". However, in 1994 he was forced to leave his post before the end of his contract, following a row over the removal of independently-elected representatives from the university's governing body.

Sir William Taylor served as Vice-Chancellor for a year during 1994 and 1995. He had previously been the Vice-Chancellor of Hull University. He only intended to remain at Huddersfield for 12 months, on an interim basis.

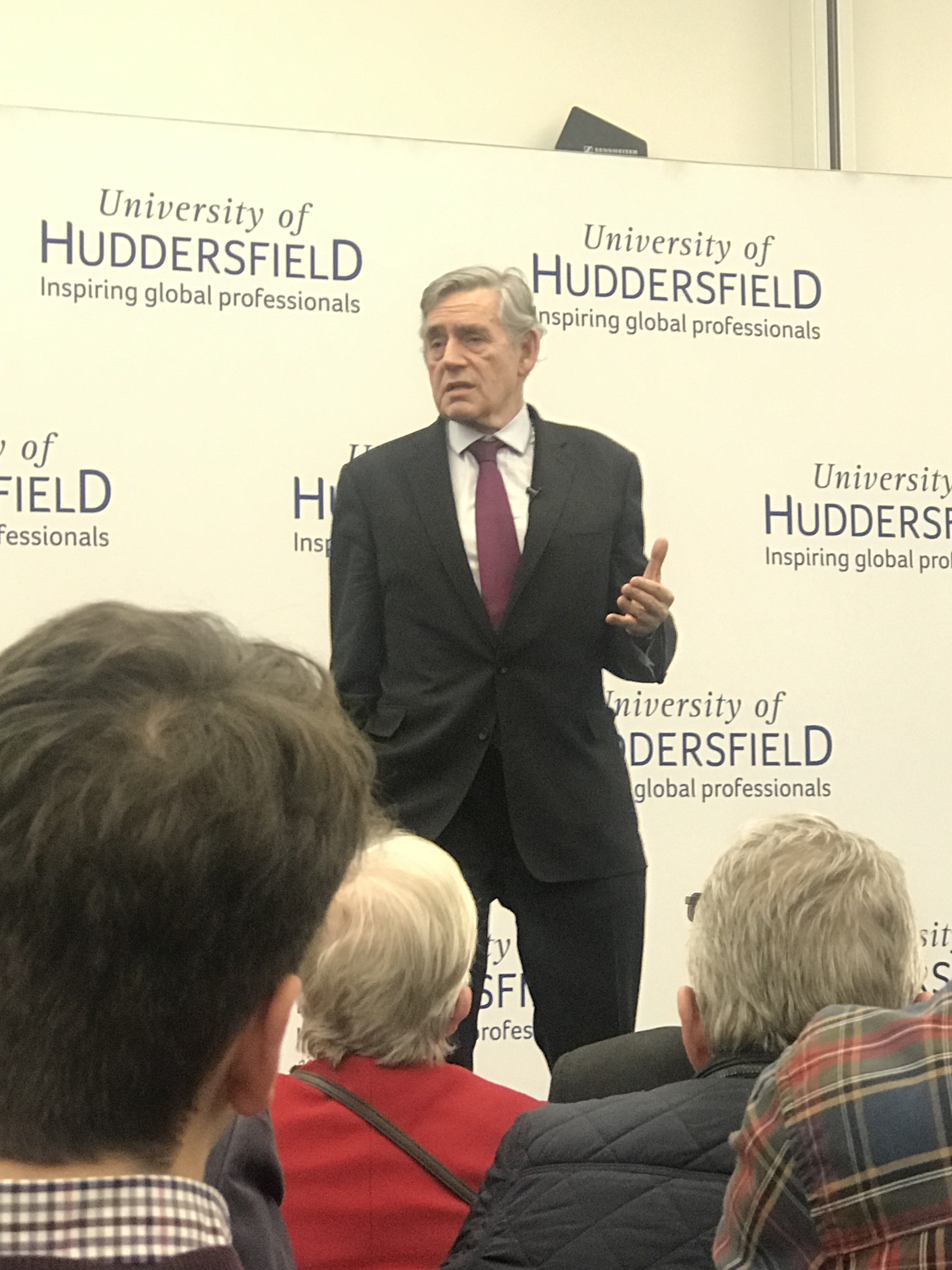
Former prime minister Gordon Brown delivers the Harold Wilson memorial lecture at the University of Huddersfield in 2018.

The next Vice-Chancellor was John Tarrant, appointed in October 1995. He served in the role until 2006, and was later Secretary General of the Association of Commonwealth Universities until his retirement in 2010. The present Vice-Chancellor, Professor Bob Cryan, himself from the Deighton area of Huddersfield, took over the job in January 2007. At the time, he was the youngest Vice-Chancellor in the UK. His strategy for the university during this time has been to lead an "inspiring, innovative University of international renown". An engineer by background, Professor Cryan became the President of the Institution of Engineering and Technology in 2023.

In May 2007, the university welcomed Queen Elizabeth for a visit to the campus, during which she unveiled the foundation stone for the new Creative Arts Building. The following year, the building was officially opened by the Duke of Kent. The university is closely associated with annual events, including the Huddersfield Contemporary Music Festival and Huddersfield Literature Festival, both of which are partly hosted at university venues.

In 2013, the University of Huddersfield was named University of the Year at the Times Higher Education Awards. Accepting the award, Professor Cryan said: "It is a tribute to all the staff who have worked so hard to get us where we are today. We are now well established as one of the country’s innovative universities – and the best is yet to come."

The university attracts students from more than 130 countries. With an annual turnover of approximately £150 million each year, it estimates it is worth £300 million annually to the local economy.

The university came under scrutiny in July 2020 for the provision of training at a Bahraini centre accused of facilitating state-sponsored torture.

In 2021, the university's chancellor George W. Buckley, lent his name to a new Leadership Centre at the university, aimed at supporting future managers and leaders.

== Campuses ==
=== Queensgate Campus ===
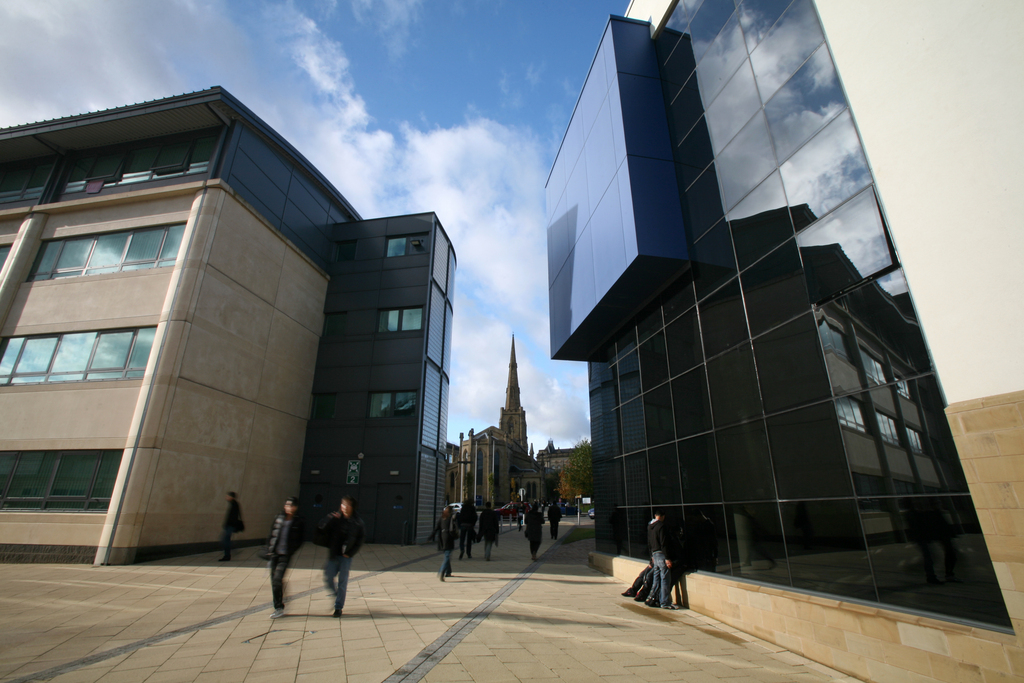
Queensgate Campus

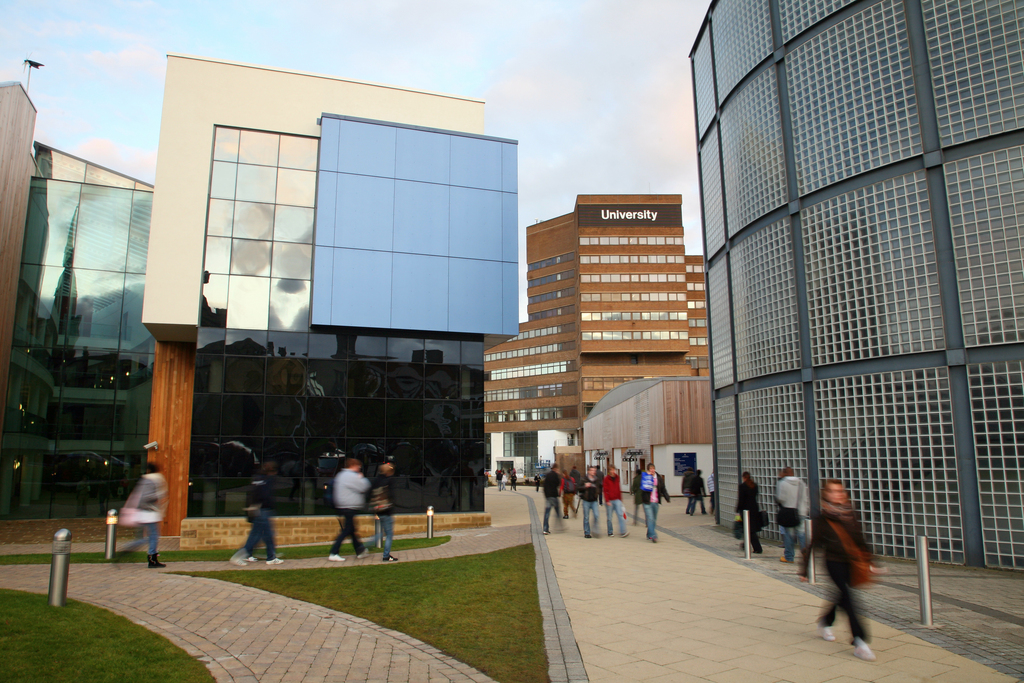
A view of Queensgate Campus

The university's main campus, Queensgate, is south-east of Huddersfield town centre. Virtually all of the university's teaching takes place on the site. The campus is split in two by the Huddersfield Narrow Canal. It features a mixture of converted mill buildings, and purpose-built facilities. More than £250 million has been invested by the university in the campus.

A notable feature of the University of Huddersfield in recent years has been the amount of building work taking place on the Queensgate campus. The Creative Arts Building opened in 2008, and it has since been adorned by a large piece of public art in the form of the poem Let There Be Peace, by Lemn Sissay. The new £17 million Business School opened in 2010, followed by the £3 million Buckley Innovation Centre in 2012, the £22.5 million Student Central building in 2014, and the £27.5 million Oastler Building for Law and the School of Music, Humanities and Media, in 2017. Redevelopments of existing buildings include the creation of the £1 million Holocaust Centre, opened in 2018, now known as Holocaust Centre North.

As part of the university's 175th anniversary commemorations in 2016, several of the buildings on the Queensgate campus were renamed after significant figures with connections to the Huddersfield area and the university's predecessor institutions. The distinctive brown Central Services Building was renamed the Schwann Building, after Frederic and Mary Schwann who had been inspired to create the Young Men's Mental Improvement Society in 1841. Other buildings were named for Edith Key, Joseph Priestley, the Brontë sisters and the university's own chancellor emeritus, Sir Patrick Stewart.

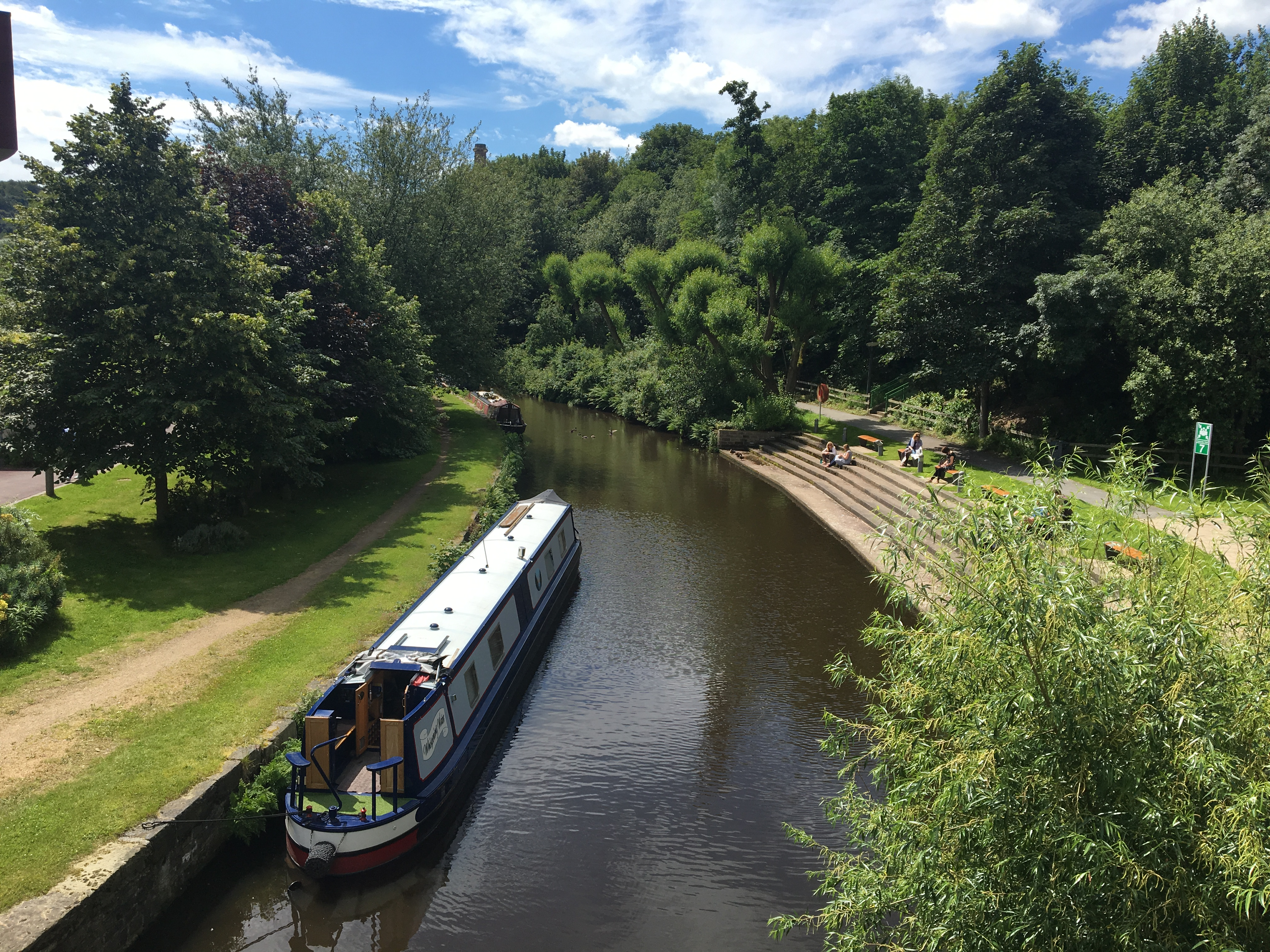
The Huddersfield Narrow Canal as it passes through the Queensgate campus.

In a second round of renaming in 2017, other campus buildings were named in honour of Karen Sparck Jones, Dame Caroline Haslett, Sir John Cockcroft, and Charles Sikes.

The university's latest major building project, the Barbara Hepworth Building, is home to teaching across subjects in art, design and architecture. It was completed in summer 2019.

Next, the university plans to build a Health Innovation Campus, at the nearby Southgate site. The area had been derelict since the demolition of the old Huddersfield Sports Centre. The proposals were approved by Kirklees Council in 2020 and form part of the broader Huddersfield Blueprint project under which a series of redevelopment schemes are taking place throughout the town.

In 2021, the Yorkshire Film and Television School was launched at the university. It features a custom-built film studio facility on Firth Street in Huddersfield, on the edge of the campus. It has been named the Stewart Film Studio, after the university's chancellor emeritus Sir Patrick Stewart.

In 2022, the newly renovated Technology Building was renamed in honour of Laura Annie Willson.

In 2023, construction began on the Daphne Steele Building in early 2023, which is home to "phase one" of a new community diagnostic centre (due to open in January 2026), part of a partnership with the Calderdale and Huddersfield NHS Foundation Trust (CHFT), in addition to new facilities for students. It was completed in September 2024.

In October 2024, the Emily Siddon Building began construction. It is expected to be completed and open in January 2026, despite previous estimates giving a finish date of December 2025.

In 2025, the Daphne building won an the Design Excellence award at the Insider Yorkshire Property Awards and the Ramsden Building won Decarbonisation Project of the Year at the National Project Excellence Awards (NPEA) due to ongoing refurbishment efforts.

=== University Campus Oldham ===
University Campus Oldham (UCO), located in Oldham, Greater Manchester, opened in May 2005. It offers full and part-time courses at degree, diploma, foundation degree and postgraduate level. Since August 2012 University Campus Oldham (UCO) has been managed by Oldham College. UCO Teacher Education programmes have continued to be validated by the university, and lead to a University of Huddersfield award.

=== University Campus Barnsley ===
University Campus Barnsley, located in Barnsley, South Yorkshire, opened in 2005. The campus offers facilities for subjects such as music, art and design, journalism and media production. £5.5 million has been invested with the help of the Higher Education Funding Council for England, Yorkshire Forward and Objective 1.

From August 2013 University Campus Barnsley (UCB) has been managed by Barnsley College. UCB programmes starting in September 2013 continue to be validated by the university, and lead to a University of Huddersfield award.

Previously the Barnsley Mining and Technical College was at this site. The “Tech” opened in 1932 when mining was at the heart of Barnsley’s economy and the College was supposedly the largest mining college in the world.

=== International Study Centre ===
The International Study Centre (ISC) at the university offers degree preparation courses for international students. The programmes are run by Study Group. The ISC is located on the university’s main Queensgate campus. Students can mix with others and also have access to the library and other specialist IT facilities.

== Organisation and governance ==
=== Chancellor ===
The university's first two chancellors were Reginald Cross, who held the role between 1992 and 1994, and Sir Ernest Hall, who served between 1996 and 2004.

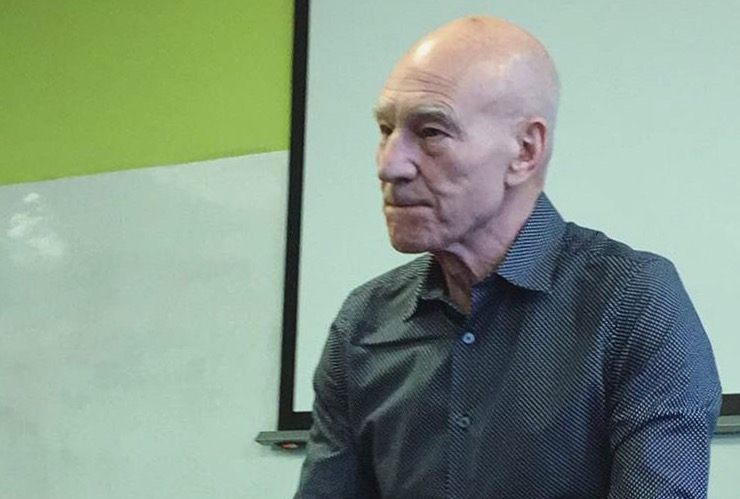
Sir Patrick Stewart meeting students on the university campus in April 2017

Sir Patrick Stewart served as chancellor for 11 years, having first been appointed in 2004. He was a regular visitor to the campus, sometimes leading workshops with drama students, in addition to being an overseas ambassador for the university. One feature of Sir Patrick's tenure as chancellor was his attendance at summer graduation ceremonies, and his leading of parades of graduates through the town. The first such parade took place in 2008. He continued his association with the university as emeritus chancellor. In 2016, the building used by the university's Drama department, previously known as the Milton building, was renamed the Sir Patrick Stewart building. He returned to the campus to reopen it.

Prince Andrew, Duke of York replaced Sir Patrick Stewart to become the university’s fourth chancellor in July 2015. He had previously served as the patron of the university since 2013. In 2013 he opened the university's centre for young entrepreneurs situated in the Buckley Innovation Centre. He resigned in 2019 following a Newsnight interview concerned with his connections to convicted sex offender Jeffrey Epstein, and amid student protests against him; the student union had called for his resignation and issued a statement that the university's chancellor was "a man with ties to organised child sexual exploitation and assault."

Since 2020, the chancellor has been businessman and graduate of the university, George W. Buckley.

=== Senior management ===
The university is run by the vice-chancellor, Professor Bob Cryan. Underneath him is deputy vice-chancellor, Professor Tim Thornton, and three pro vice-chancellors. Each of the five academic schools is led by a dean, with a seventh dean who oversees the graduate school. The university previously had seven schools, but the former schools of Art, Design and Architecture and Music, Humanities and Media merged in 2021 to form the school of Arts and Humanities. Other university services are run by directors.

== Academic profile ==
=== Academic schools ===
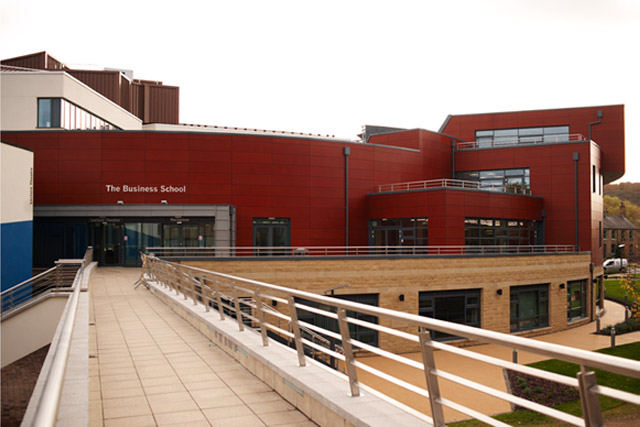
New Business School

The university is organised into the following academic schools:

- Applied Sciences
- Arts and Humanities
- Computing and Engineering
- School of Business, Education and Law
- Human and Health Sciences

=== Research ===
The university has world-leading applied research groups in biomedical sciences, engineering and physical sciences, social sciences and arts and humanities. It has quadrupled its research income and its number of postgraduate researchers in recent years.

In the 2014 Research Excellence Framework (REF) exercise, the University of Huddersfield achieved its best ever result. It rose to 68th in the UK Research Power league table, having been placed 97th in the 2008 REF. More University of Huddersfield academics, 262, were entered than in any previous cycle, and the proportion of world leading research submitted increased to 15%.

The 2021 REF allowed the university to further develop its performance, submitting 589 academic staff. It is now placed in the top third of all UK institutions on the measurement of 'research power'.

The university also host the MIAMI facilities, a world-class laboratory addressed to materials sciences investigations and energy studies.

=== Reputation and rankings ===
Rankings
National rankings
- Complete (2027): 68=
- Guardian (2027): 104
- Times / Sunday Times (2027): 95

Global rankings
- QS (2027): 521=
- THE (2026): 501–600

It was ranked 701+ in the 2015–16 QS World University Rankings. The university was the Entrepreneurial University of the Year at the THE awards 2012. It won the Outstanding Registry Team 2013 at the THE Leadership and Management awards 2013. The university was University of the Year at the THE awards 2013. In 2014 the university was named the Times Higher Education's (THE) Best University Workplace. The university was the New University of the Year at the Educate North Awards 2015. The university has also been ranked as 20th place on the QS World University Rankings for the subject of Music, being the highest ranked non-conservatoire university in Britain on the list.

The university has a policy of ensuring all academic staff have, or are working towards, a teaching qualification. In 2016, the university came top among all UK universities for having qualified teaching staff. More than 90% of its academics were found to have a teaching qualification, with the next-highest institution scoring 84%. By 2020, the university remained joint top among English universities.

== Heritage Quay ==
The university's archive collection is named Heritage Quay and housed in the Schwann building on the Queensgate Campus. It holds the archives of all the university's predecessor institutions. Heritage Quay opened in 2014 and is open to the general public, allowing easier access to both students and non-students to the many collections within the university's archives. It received more than £1.5 million in Lottery funding, and in 2016 won the Buildings That Inspire category in The Guardian's University Awards. Heritage Quay is home to the archive of the Rugby Football League. The university has been partnering with the RFL and Kirklees Council as part of a project to turn the historic George Hotel in Huddersfield into a national museum of rugby league although the project has been thrown into some doubt by the council's desire to house the museum at a different location in the town. Heritage Quay's collections focus on "education, British 20th/21st century music, sport, politics, theatre, and art and design". In 2023, it became the new home of brass band history.

== Student life ==
=== Accommodation ===
The Storthes Hall Park Student Village and Ashenhurst Student Houses are the university-affiliated accommodation. These residences are privately owned and operated by Digs Student, independently of the university.

Storthes Hall is situated in a parkland to the south of the town with 1,386 en-suite single, double or disabled bedrooms in shared flats of six to eight students.

Ashenhurst Houses are located in woodlands close to the campus and Storthes Hall Park. There are 280 single bedrooms in shared houses of six to eight students, all with shared facilities including a communal lounge and kitchen/dining area.

HudLets work with halls of residences and private landlords to ensure students have access to high-quality accommodation at a fair price during their studies. Incorporated In 2014, Huddersfield Students' Union Lettings LTD (trading as HudLets) is a subsidiary of Huddersfield Students' Union.

=== Students' Union ===
Huddersfield Students' Union (HSU) represents, supports and advises students on all aspects of their time at the university.

HSU is a charity based on campus, led by students for students, although they work closely with the university, it is a completely separate organisation. The Union is home to over 100 student-led Sports Clubs and Societies and five Student Networks helping members making change on and off campus. The student-run radio station Radio Hud and magazine and website Galvanise are among the prominent media-focused societies which operate from the SU. Galvanise relaunched in 2022, having previously been known as T'Hud.

The Students' Union is also home to a lettings agency (HudLets), an Advice Centre and Shop.

In November 2017 HSU celebrated its 90th birthday.

In January 2014 HSU moved to Floor 5 of the newly purpose-built Student Central building. The building cost £22.5 million and includes an 800-capacity sports hall, catering outlets, a shop, offices for the student radio station Radio Hud and magazine T'Hud, and a range of university support services including welfare and the careers centre. There was some controversy when the new building opened as it does not include a bar. Reports suggested the bar in the previous union building had been losing as much as £100,000 a year, with students instead choosing to drink at home or in other nearby pubs and clubs.

== Noted people ==
=== Royal connections ===
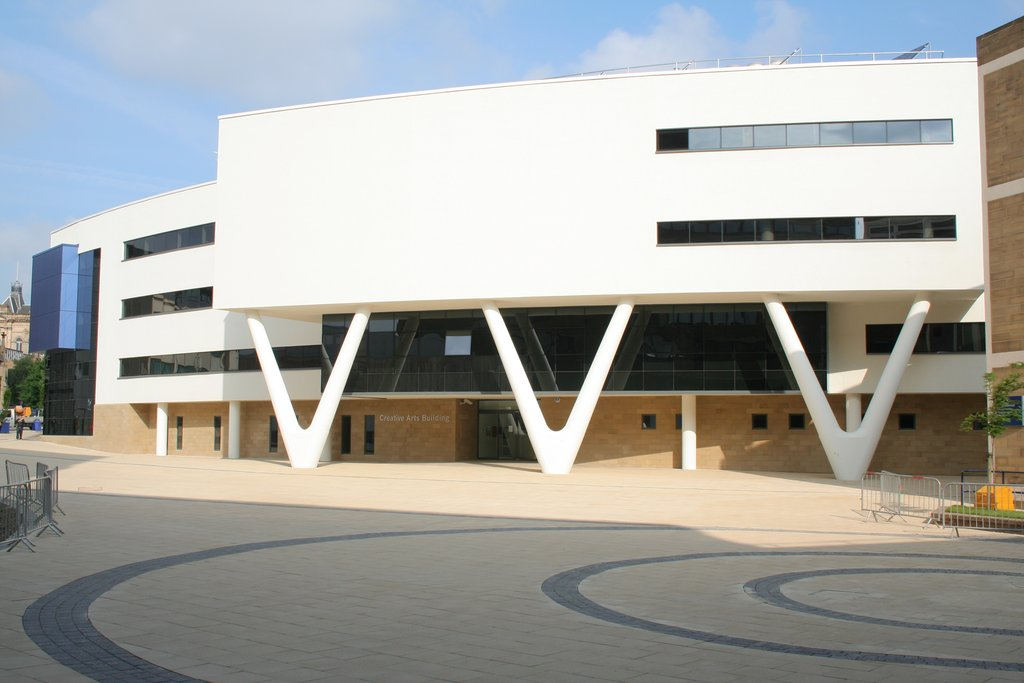
The Creative Arts Building.

The university has developed a significant association with the royal family in recent years, in particular with the appointment of Prince Andrew, Duke of York as patron in 2013 and then chancellor in 2015, although he later resigned in 2019. The Duke's former wife, Sarah, Duchess of York, was in 2016 given the title of Visiting Professor of Philanthropreneurship. Their elder daughter, Princess Beatrice, has also visited the university to meet students and view their work.

Queen Elizabeth II visited the campus in 2007 to lay the foundation stone of the Creative Arts Building. Other royals to have visited the university in the years since include Anne, Princess Royal, who in 2015 opened the new Student Central building, Prince Edward, Duke of Kent and Prince Richard, Duke of Gloucester. Charles, Prince of Wales visited University Campus Barnsley in 2012.

In 2022, the university's Centre for Precision Technologies was awarded the Queen's Anniversary Prize, at a prize giving event at St James's Palace in London.

== See also ==
- Armorial of UK universities
- List of universities in the UK
- Post-1992 universities
