= Huddersfield Media Centre project =

Coordinates: 53.649°N 1.781°W

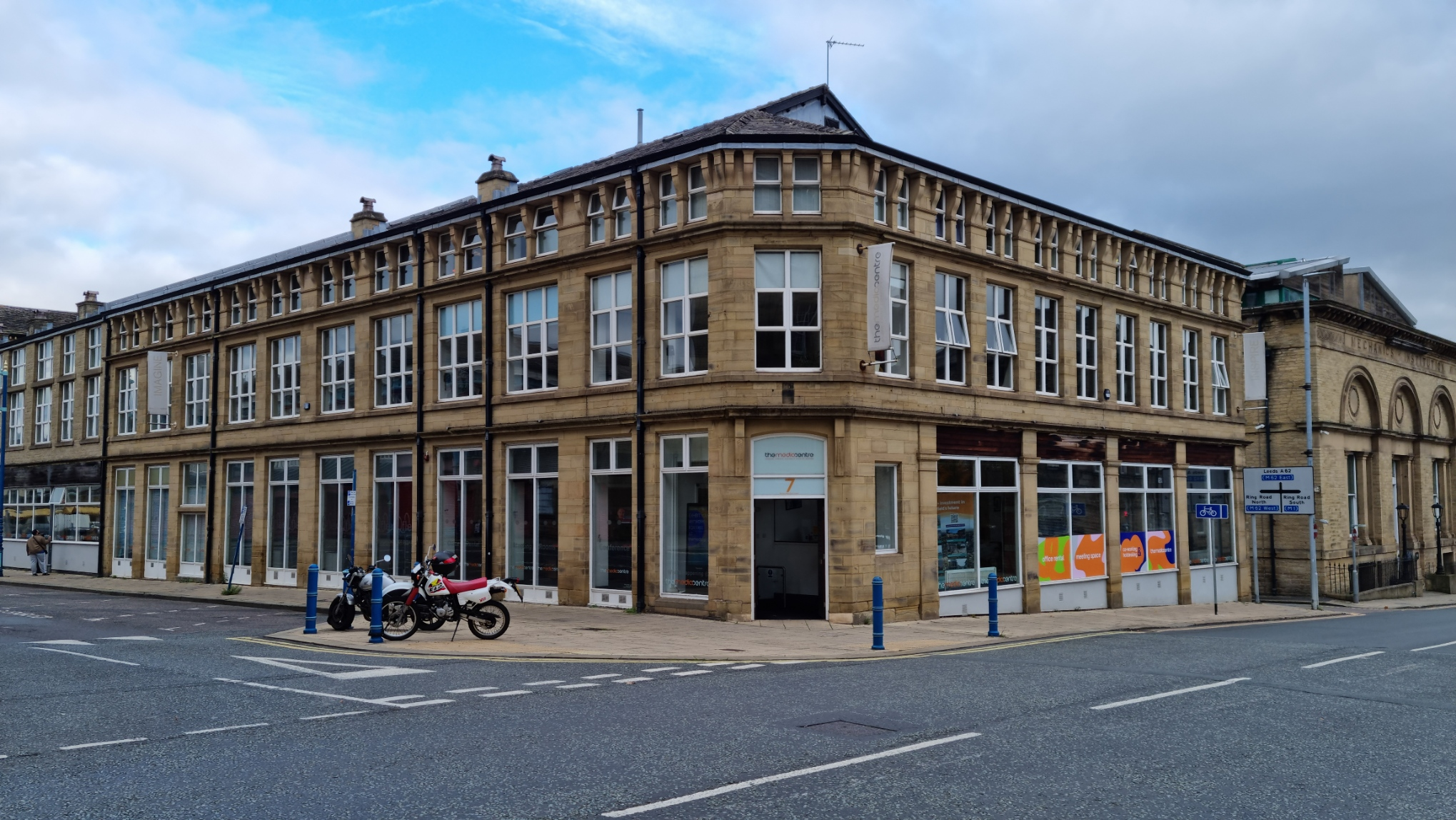
The Media Centre Huddersfield

The Media Centre is a business centre and a community of digital, media and creative and supporting industry businesses in the West Yorkshire town of Huddersfield, England, with 65 managed office spaces and Flex, a dedicated co-working and hot desk area for freelancers and remote workers. It offers flexible workspace solutions, Virtual Office packages and meeting room hire.

== History ==
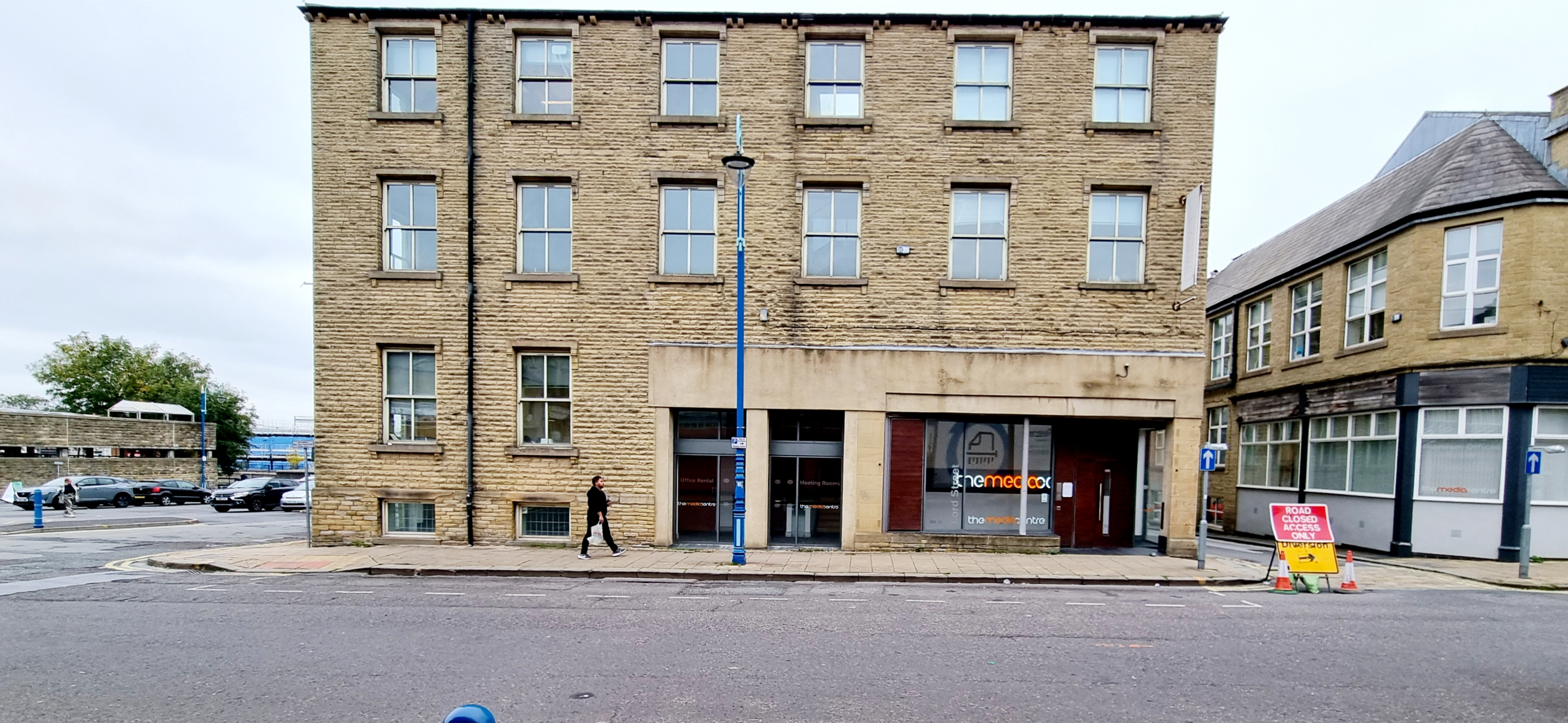
Old buildings in Northumberland Street

The Media Centre opened its doors in 1995. The first building was on Northumberland Street, Huddersfield, with only a third of it in use when the centre opened. The success of the first companies based in the centre and their rapid expansion meant that by 2000, the building was converted and full of media businesses.

Its second building (Lord Street) was opened in November 2001, this is located immediately adjacent to the main Media Centre building opposite the old Open Market. These new offices were designed by Bauman-Lyons architects and provide a range of office spaces.

Since 2004, The Media Centre has been owned and operated by Creative Media Centres Ltd, a not-for-profit small business located within The Media Centre

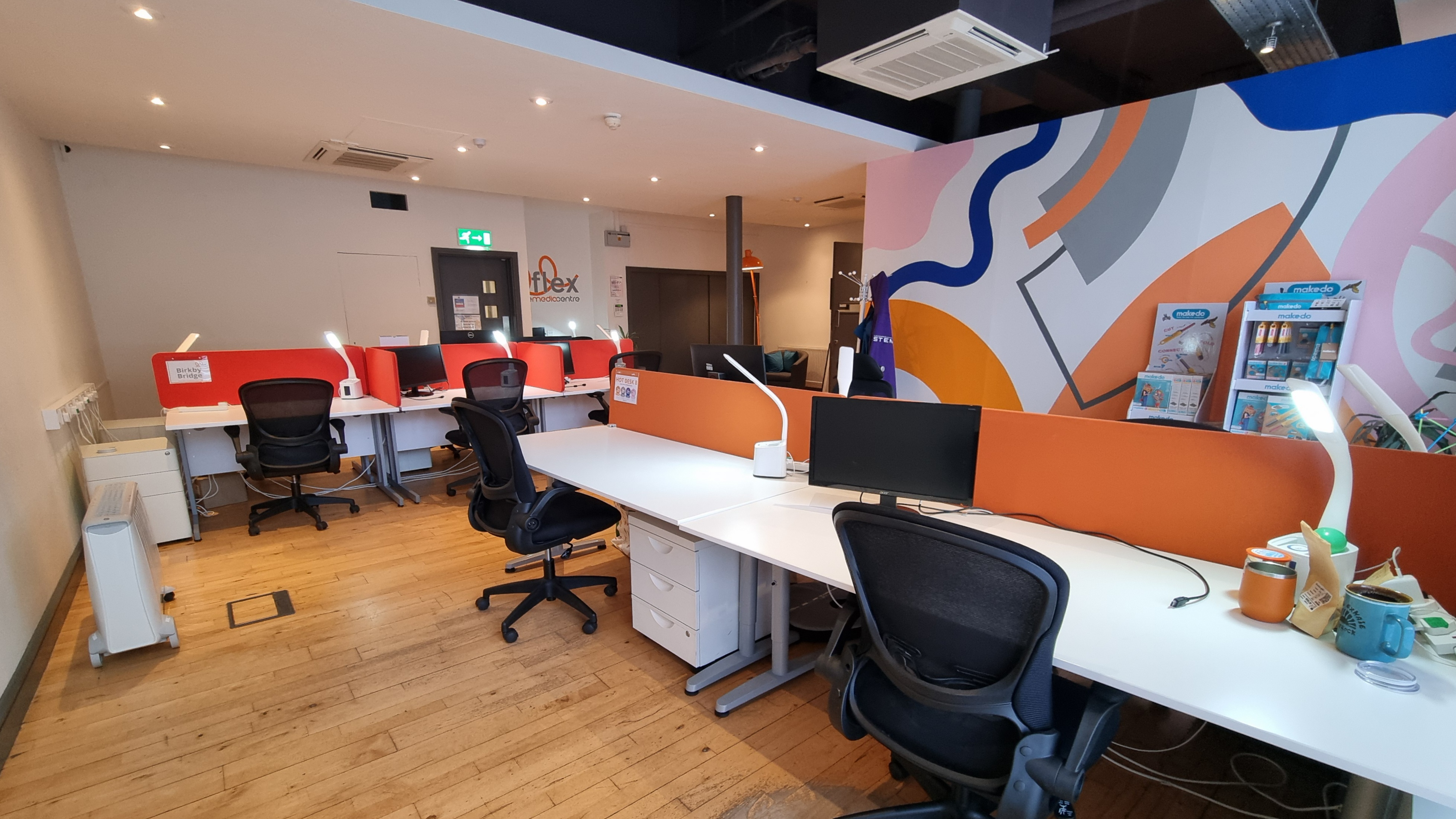
The Media Centre Lord Street Building

In 2021 a hot desking space, Flex was opened in the previous exhibition space located in behind reception.
